= Contemporary Sant Mat movements =

New Sant Mat-derived religious movement

Contemporary Sant Mat Movements, mostly among the Radha Soami tradition, are esoteric philosophy movements active in Australia, Europe, Latin America and the US, but especially India. These movements assert that Sant Mat shares a lineage with Sikhism and contains elements of thought found in Hinduism, such as karma and reincarnation. They further assert that Sant Mat also contains elements found in Sufism and has inspired and influenced a number of religious groups and organizations. They refer to this spiritual path as the "Science of the Soul" or 'Sant Mat', meaning 'teachings of the saints'. More recently it has been described as "The Way of Life" or "Living the Life of Soul". It incorporates a practical yoga system known as Surat Shabd Yoga.

Contemporary Sant Mat movements claim to incorporate a personal and private path of spiritual development in the common tradition of mystics past and present. They discuss the irrelevance of rituals, priestly class, mandatory contributions, or compulsory gatherings.

== Introduction ==
The basic teaching of contemporary Sant Mat, as described by its Masters, is that everything lies inside us and that God is within. The outside world is only an image or a reflection of the inner reality. So self-knowledge or knowledge of the higher self and God-knowledge (taken as a practical project rather than a theoretical inquiry) are the topics of Sant Mat.

Kirpal Singh describes Sant Mat as a synonym for Surat Shabd Yoga, the yoga of the Sound Current, or more simply Shabd yoga, a meditation technique he asserts was taught and practiced originally in northern India. Singh writes that practitioners of Shabd yoga position the path as not requiring the physical torture of penance and austerities that marked many of the yogas and spiritual paths throughout the ages. Thus it is sometimes called "Sehaj" (easy) yoga.

Widely accepted translations of the Indian term "Sant Mat" are "Teachings of the Saints" and "Path of the Masters". These are both incidentally the titles of prominent works on the subject. Another commonly accepted definition of the term is found in Man Know Thyself by Sant Kirpal Singh:

Man is constantly changing or introducing new names and terminologies to describe this Science. The Masters were called Sants, and the nature of knowledge Mat, thus giving us the term 'Sant-Mat', which is at present mostly used to name the Path of the Masters. Other terms, such as Shabd Yoga, Surat Shabd Yoga, Sehaj Yoga, are also used to describe the same Science. In the Sanskrit language, the word 'Sant' means Master of the highest Order, and 'Mat' is a confirmed opinion or statement made by an adept after personal experience. The foundation of this Science, therefore, is the result of a critical study, minute investigation, and the lifelong personal verification of facts based on practical experience of the Self in man. This experience of the Self is something that a competent Master is prepared to give to each individual who approaches him. Sant Mat, therefore, is the teaching, system and path of the Saints.

However, terminology, names, and groups are not considered to be of any importance in Sant Mat:

The Masters do not attach any importance to names, designations, or the fact that many religious sects, groups and circles, have claimed this Science as their own and named it after their leaders or founders. They look upon these groups as schools where man—the noblest being in Creation—can study with other men as children of one and the same Almighty Father.

== Origins ==
Sant Mat (literally, "school of the Sants") was a loosely associated group of teachers that assumed prominence in the northern part of the Indian sub-continent from about the 13th century. Their teachings are distinguished theologically by inward loving devotion to a divine principle, and socially by an egalitarianism opposed to the qualitative distinctions of the Indian caste hierarchy and to the religious differences between Hinduism and Islam.

== Geographical reach ==
Contemporary Sant Mat movements exist all over the world.

Radha Soami Satsang Beas, the mission begun by Jaimal Singh at the turn of the 19th century, has its headquarters known as "Dera Baba Jaimal Singh", near the river Beas in northern India since 1891. His master Shiv Dayal Singh had perhaps 500 initiates, and if one wanted to see the Master it was necessary to travel to his home in Agra. His lineage continues at Radhasoami Satsang Dayalbagh, Agra in India. The Dayalbagh Agra lineage follow Shiv Dayal Singh - Salig Ram -Maharaj Sahab - Kamta Prasad Sinha- Anand Swarup - Gurcharan Das Mehta - Makund Behari Lal and recently (Since 2003 Prem Saran Satsangi. Jaimal Singh had perhaps 2500 initiates and did not travel more than a few hundred miles from Beas while he was a Master. Sawan Singh did not travel outside of India, but is believed to have had as many as one lac (100,000) initiates, some of whom were foreigners. Jagat Singh also did not travel outside India. Charan Singh did travel overseas and the present master Gurinder Singh, travels to nearly 90 countries. Today the Radha Soami Satsang Beas is leading the way forward and encompassing all the teachings of the saints.

Sant Kirpal Singh visited Europe and the United States in 1955 and 1963, and Europe, America, and Latin America in 1972. The various spiritual leaders who claim to lead this movement now frequently travel all over the world.

== General tenets ==
The most central tenet is the need to be initiated by a living Master or Satguru ("sat" meaning true and "guru" meaning Master or Spiritual Teacher). "Competent Master" is another common formulation: the Master must be competent in the sense of having been commissioned by God, not just a person who feels like working in the role of a guru:

It is a sad affair that there are thousands of imitators, of false copies, but it doesn't mean that the world is devoid of truth and that a Master is not available to the people...It has always been a law that at least one complete master would be on earth to bring God's truth to the people. One such Master can benefit the entire world just as one sun can glorify and light up the entire world.

Sant Mat practice involves listening to the Inner Sound, contemplating Inner Light, and (eventually) leaving the human body at will - a practice sometimes referred to as "dying while living". The principal intent is to awaken the Soul and unite it with God. Sant Mat is a practical and not a theoretical investigation.

Contemporary Sant Mat movements claim to be different in a radical sense from other disciplines or kinds of knowledge, which can be taught. It claims to be a meta-knowledge or method of going beyond knowledge and deprecates the mind and mental processes, at all times describing a dichotomy between the mind and the soul, in which the mind is only a negative copy or imitation of the soul. The mind is to become still and quiet so that the soul can begin to experience itself.

The second essential tenet is the mystical role of the Sound Current:

Prajapatir vai idam-agree asit Tasya vak dvitiya asit Vak vai Paramam Brahma

In the beginning was Prajapati (the Creator),

With Him was the Vak (the Word), And the Vak (the Word) was verily the Supreme Brahman.

Proponents compare this with the verses of John 1 to assert their special use of comparative religion (seeking the common thread in all religions and esoteric phenomena). Naam or Word, written by Sant Kirpal Singh, explores this theme. It asserts that the Sound Current is the esoteric form of God, which is available to human beings. The Guru, who is a human being, has merged with the Sound Current in such a manner that he is a living manifestation of it, (the Word made flesh). However, not just the Guru can achieve this, but all human beings are inherently privileged in this way.

=== Helping factors ===
Beyond the two main tenets, Contemporary Sant Mat movements emphasize an ethical lifestyle and selfless service. They assert that these are not spirituality as such, but are necessary preparation for true spirituality to commence. A self-introspective diary or daily diary tracking ethical lifestyle in five cardinal disciplines is sometimes recommended as a way to self-monitor one's own ethical condition. The five cardinal virtues tracked by the diary are Ahimsa or Nonviolence, Truthfulness, Chastity, love for all regardless of caste, creed, wealth, or intellectual attainments (i.e., Humility), and finally the maintenance of a strict Vegetarian diet. Drugs and alcohol are also to be avoided, as is the company of worldly-minded people.

Selfless Service or Seva means devoting oneself to mental, physical, or financial service to the Guru, and the sangat (or devotees). Mental service means keeping constant remembrance of God by means of repetition of the Mantra (known as Simran) or by other means keeping the Guru in mind. Physical service means doing some physical work, as in the situation where one helps dig a well at an ashram or gives a talk about the Master to the public. Financial service means giving money to the mission of the Master (to his organization) instead of spending it on oneself. The concept of Financial Seva is quite similar to tithing as known generally in Christianity. Also, just as a very general rule, at least 10% of one's time should be spent in meditation.

=== Practices ===
Contemporary Sant Mat movements assert that the "Master" or Guru is provided by God as the channel through which God manifests in the world. God is believed to be unknowable and inconceivable, so he has created Gurus as a way in which to be available. Only humans are capable of interacting with a Master, as other forms of life are asserted to be incapable of doing so.

Teachers of contemporary Sant Mat movements claim to teach a spiritual path that is intentionally easier than others described in the ancient scriptures, as it requires nothing more than sitting quietly and looking and listening within.

Specifics of this process include connecting one's soul or attention, called Surat (soul) with the inner Current of Light and Sound of God, the Shabd. Adherents believe this Sound Current cannot be heard by the uninitiated; it is made manifest at the time of initiation. An essential component of the practice involves sitting still with eyes closed, with one's attention focused at the "third eye center", located between and behind the two eyebrows, while (mentally) repeating one or more mantras given by the Guru to the disciple at the time of initiation. This is called simran (repetition) and its primary function is to still the mind while remembering (or being connected to) the Guru via the mantra he provided. However listening to the Sound Current by plugging the ears with the thumbs and listening at the right side or above is equally as important. Sound is considered to be the source of the Light, and to contain everything required.

The concept of Satsang is also a common thread in contemporary Sant Mat movements' practices. Satsang means literally "gathering of Truth." These gatherings serve as the formal meeting place of the Master and his devotees when he is present in physical form, but also, more often, follow the tradition of early Christianity and take place in the homes of disciples or in any convenient location as times of remembrance of the Master and the need for meditation.

In contemporary Sant Mat movements, not everyone automatically qualifies for Initiation; many teachers require that prospective followers be spiritually “ready”. This was especially true in earlier times, when people made more time available. There are definite criteria for judging whether or not a person is indeed ready for initiation: they must be ready to eschew drugs and alcohol, lead a disciplined and chaste lifestyle, avoid spiritual healing and other forms of meditation, and commit to several hours of meditation per day.

== Sects ==
There are many sects/movements within contemporary Sant Mat movements, with different leaders and varying belief systems. Examples include Advait Mat and Radha Soami with following sub-lineages: the Radha Soami Satsang Beas, Radha Soami Satsang Dayalbagh, Radha Swami Satsang, Dinod, Ruhani Satsang, and also the Science of Spirituality (SOS) with Sawan Kirpal Ruhani Mission and Dera Sacha Sauda.

The work of David C. Lane provides a partial catalogue of various sects related to the Radha Soami Satsang Beas and attempts to study their formation from a socio-economic point of view. Mark Juergensmeyer has also extensively studied groups related to Radha Soami Satsang Beas.

=== Related movements ===
The new religious movement Eckankar is considered by some to be an offshoot of the Sant Mat tradition. Paul Twitchell, who founded Eckankar, was an initiate of Kirpal Singh.

The similar to Eckankar American syncretistic Movement of Spiritual Inner Awareness was founded in 1971 by John-Roger Hinkins.

The "Quan Yin Method" of meditation promoted though the spiritual teachings of Ching Hai, a former student of Thakar Singh, also has notable similarities to Sant Mat.

The Elan Vital, formerly Divine Light Mission, founded by Hans Maharaj and succeeded by his sons Prem Rawat and Satpal Maharaj, was characterized as part of the Sant Mat tradition. Satpal Maharaj also established the Manav Utthan Sewa Samiti.

In the West, detailed indications and advice have been given by Edward Salim Michael in his book The Law of attention, Nada Yoga and the way of inner vigilance. Ajahn Sumedho, from the Thai Forest Tradition teaches the practice of this inner sound.

== See also ==
- Param Sant Kirpal Singh
- Sant Darshan Singh
- Rajinder Singh (Sant Mat)
- Ajaib Singh
- Sirio Carrapa
- Baba Faqir Chand
- Bhagat Munshi Ram
- Thakar Singh
- Gurus of Shabdism
- Nada yoga
