= Gurus of Shabdism =

Teachers of Shabda in India

This is a list of gurus who gave teachings about Shabda, the Path of Sound.

Name	Notability	References
Shiv Dayal Singh	Founder of Radha Soami.	
Baba Devi Sahab	Spiritual teacher of Moradabad.	
Maharshi Mehi Paramhans	Successor of Baba Devi Sahab. Taught in Kuppaghat, Bhagalpur, Bihar.	
Salig Ram	Successor of Shiv Dayal Singh and Postmaster General of the North Western Provinces.	
Maharaj Sahab	Successor of Salig Ram and Third Guru of Radha Soami.	
Data Dayal Maharishi Shiv Brat Lal	Disciple of Salig Ram.	
Kamta Prasad Sinha	Successor of Maharaj Sahab and Fourth Guru of Radha Soami.	
Anand Swarup	Successor of Kamta Prasad Sinha and Fifth Guru of Radha Soami.	
Mastana Balochistani	Founder of Dera Sacha Sauda.	
Gurcharan Das Mehta	Successor of Anand Swarup and Sixth Guru of Radha Soami.	
Swarupanand	Master of Paramhans Advait Mat.	
Sardar Bahadur Jagat Singh Ji Maharaj	He was known for his efficiency, affability, quiet and unassuming demeanor, humility, kindness, and devotion to his guru; called "the perfect disciple." In his teachings emphasised devotion, meditation, and spirituality.	
Hans Ji Maharaj	Successor of Swarupanand. Founder, God, and guru of Divya Sandesh Parishad. Taught Techniques of Knowledge. Regarded as an incarnation of Krsna.	
Maharaj Charan Singh	Grandson of Baba Sawan Singh. Successor of Sardar Bahadur Maharaj Jagat Singh. He founded the annual Dera Eye Camp in Beas and the Maharaj Sawan Singh Charitable Hospital, Beas. In his teachings, he emphasised devotion, meditation, spirituality, and charity. He ignored socio-religious conventions regarding caste, and disallowed segregation in the Dera Baba Jaimal Singh colony. During disturbances in 1987–88, he sheltered hundreds of Hindu, Muslim and Sikh refugees at Dera Baba Jaimal Singh.	
Makund Behari Lal	Successor of Gurcharan Das Mehta and Seventh Guru of Radha Soami.	
Prem Saran Satsangi	Successor of Makund Behari Lal and Eighth Guru of Radha Soami.	
Satpal Maharaj	Son and successor of Hans Ji Maharaj.	
Prem Rawat	Son and successor of Hans Ji Maharaj. Founder, God, and guru of Divine Light Mission and Elan Vital. Teaches Knowledge. Subject of the film Lord of the Universe. Guru of Rennie Davis.	
Bhagat Singh Thind	Sikh immigrant to the USA, lumber mill worker, US Army soldier, partisan for Indian freedom from Britain, advocate of citizenship rights of Indians in the USA, and writer and lecturer on spirituality.	
Paul Twitchell / Peddar Zaskq	American chela of Sudar Singh and Rebazar Tarzs. The Mahanta, the 971st Living ECK Master. Modern-day founder of ECKANKAR.	
John-Roger / Roger Delano Hinkins	American holder of the Mystical Traveler Consciousness. Founder of the Movement for Spiritual Inner Awareness.	
Darwin Gross / Dap Ren	Successor of Paul Twitchell. The 972nd Living ECK Master.	
Param Sant Kanwar Saheb	present master of Radha Swami Satsang, Dinod.	
Thakar Singh	Founder of Kirpal Light Satsang.	
Dr Harbhajan Singh	Commissioned by Kirpal Singh to carry on his work, he dedicated his whole life to the service of humanity. Founded Unity of Man Centre for the West (Austria), Kirpal Sagar, Kirpal Charitable Hospital, Kirpal Sagar Academy, and Fathers' Home.	
Ajaib Singh Maharaj	Visited Sawan Singh, Somanath, and Mastana Balochistani. Disciple of Nirmala-Udasi sadhu Bishandas and Kirpal Singh. Founded Sant Bani Ashram at Village 16PS, Rajasthan. Had many Western disciples. Had three successors: Sadhu Ram, Ram Singh, and Sirio Carrapa.	
Harold Klemp / Wah Z	American chela of Paul Twitchell. Successor of Darwin Gross. The Mahanta, the 973rd Living ECK Master.	
Baba Gurinder Singh	Nephew and successor of Maharaj Charan Singh. He tours India and the world to spread the teachings of Sant Mat.	
Ching Hai	Vietnamese teacher of the Quan Yin Method. Founder of the Supreme Master Ching Hai International Association. Based in Taiwan. Donated millions of dollars to charitable works around the world.	
Sirio Carrapa	Italian successor of Ajaib Singh. Founded Sant Bani Ashram in Italy.	
Baljit Singh	Successor of Sant Thakar Singh.	
