= Poet Saint =

Poet Saint may refer to:

- Sant Mat, one of the group of teachers of the Indian subcontinent beginning in the 13th century
  - The Contemporary Sant Mat movements claiming connection to Sant Mat
- Du Fu, Chinese poet during the Tang dynasty
- Milarepa, a Tibetan Buddhist

There are several poet theologians of 4th to 6th century Syriac literature
