= Kamta Prasad Sinha =

Fourth Sant Satguru of Radhasoami Faith and Founder Radhasoami Satsang Sabha

Param Guru Sarkar Sahab
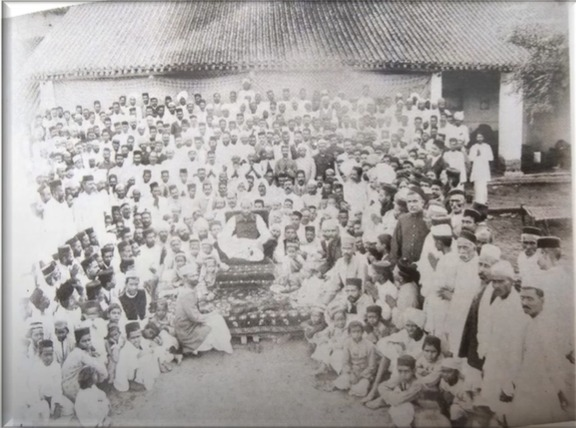
- Title: Spiritual Teacher (Sant Satguru)

Personal life
- Born: 12 December 1871 Murar, Bihar
- Died: 7 December 1913 (aged 41 ) Murar, Bihar
- Other names: Param Purush Puran Dhani Sarkar Sahab, Sarkar Saheb

Religious life
- Religion: Sant SatGuru Of Radha Soami Sect
- Sect: Sant Mat Radhasoami

Senior posting
- Based in: Ghazipur, Uttar Pradesh, India; Agra, Uttar Pradesh, India
- Period in office: 1907-1913
- Predecessor: Maharaj Sahab
- Successor: Anand Swarup

Kamta Prasad Sinha, commonly known as Param Guru Sarkar Sahab, was the fourth revered sant satguru of the Radhasoami faith. He was the Spiritual Guru in Radhasoami Satsang Dayalbagh spiritual tradition and Head of Radhasoami Satsang Sabha, from 1907 to 1913.

Dayalbagh based Center of Radhasoami Faith was also founded by him in 1907

== Early life ==
Sarkar Sahab was born on 12 December 1871, at Murar in Bihar. His parents named Him as Kamta Prasad Sinha. Even in His childhood, He had evinced traits of exceptional intelligence and memory. He had good command of Hindi, English, Urdu and Persian and a special aptitude for music and poetry. He was a skillful rider and an expert at the game of chess. He was also a well-known cricket player.

He passed the LL.B. Examination and started practice of law at Ghazipur, rising to be a lawyer of high eminence. Sarkar Sahab was initiated into the Radhasoami Faith in 1891 by Maharaj Sahab.

== As Fourth Sant Satguru ==
Sarkar Sahab succeeded Maharaj Sahab in 1907. Some influential members of the Central Administrative Council ( Old Council of Radhasoami Satsang Dayalbagh before 1910) established by Maharaj Sahab were not prepared to accept Sarkar Sahab as the Successor of Maharaj Sahab. When all efforts of Sarkar Sahab to change their uncooperative attitude proved to be of no avail, the Ghazipur Satsang held a meeting in which a separate independent body, The New council Radhasoami Satsang Sabha was formed. Out of 116 branch Satsangs of Maharaj Sahab's time representatives of 111 had attended that meeting. He was succeeded by Anand Swarup alias Sahab Ji Maharaj in 1913.

== Literature ==
He was also the author of Holy book Prem Samachar and Four Letters composed in form of Prose and Poetry addressing the teaching of Radhasoami faith. He contributed a number of Articles to Prem Samachar, a monthly magazine published in 1913.

One of these articles, entitled "Param Guru" is a fine exposition of the status of the Sant Satguru in the Radhasoami Faith. It has been clearly established in that article that the "NIJ DHAR (Devine Current)" shall not be withdrawn from this plane of creation until the redemption of all JIVAS has been affected. Sarkar Sahab also composed some SHABDAS (hymns), the recitation of which deeply moves the hearts of the devotees.

== Radhasoami Satsang Dayalbagh ==
The Guru Lineage of Sarkar Sahab continue till date at: Dayalbagh, Agra (Headquarter of the community) . Lineage: Shiv Dayal Singh (Soami Ji Maharaj)- Salig Ram(Huzur Maharaj)— Brahm Shankar Misra(Maharaj Sahab) — Kamta Prasad Sinha(Sarkar Sahab) — Anand Swarup (Sahab Ji Maharaj, Founder of Dayalbagh) — Gurcharan Das Mehta(Mehta Ji Maharaj) — Makund Behari Lal(Lal Sahab) — Prem Saran Satsangi(Satsangi Sahab). Dayalbagh was founded by Anand Swarup, Kt. The present Guru Prem Saran Satsangi( Param Guru Huzur Prof. PS Satsangi Sahab) is an emeritus professor, physicist and system scientist of IIT Delhi. The 200th birth anniversary of Shiv Dayal Singh was celebrated in Dayalbagh from August 2017 to 24 August 2018.

== Departure ==
In summer of 1913, Sarkar Sahab was keeping indifferent health and went to Mussoorie for a change. When he returned to Murar in October, 1913, His health had greatly deteriorated. Thereafter, AKHAND PATH (Continuous recitation of Shabdas) was held in the courtyard in front of His bedroom and continued till 6 December 1913. He was pleased to leave His Mortal Frame at 6 am on 7 December 1913. His Holy Samadh is situated at Murar. Most gracious Huzur named the Holy Samadh as Radhasoami Vihar.

== Samadh ==
Sarkar Sahab samadh is located in Bihar at Murar considered as a holy place among his followers.
