= Radhaswami =

Radhaswami (Sanskrit: "the swami of Radha") can refer to:

- Krishna
- Radhaswami (Buddhist sage), a Brahmin Buddhist sage, under whose guidance the Mauryan emperor Ashoka adopted Buddhism
- Radha Soami, a spiritual movement founded by Shiv Dayal Singh
