= Naam yog Sadhna Mandir =

Hindu Temple in Uttar Pradesh, India

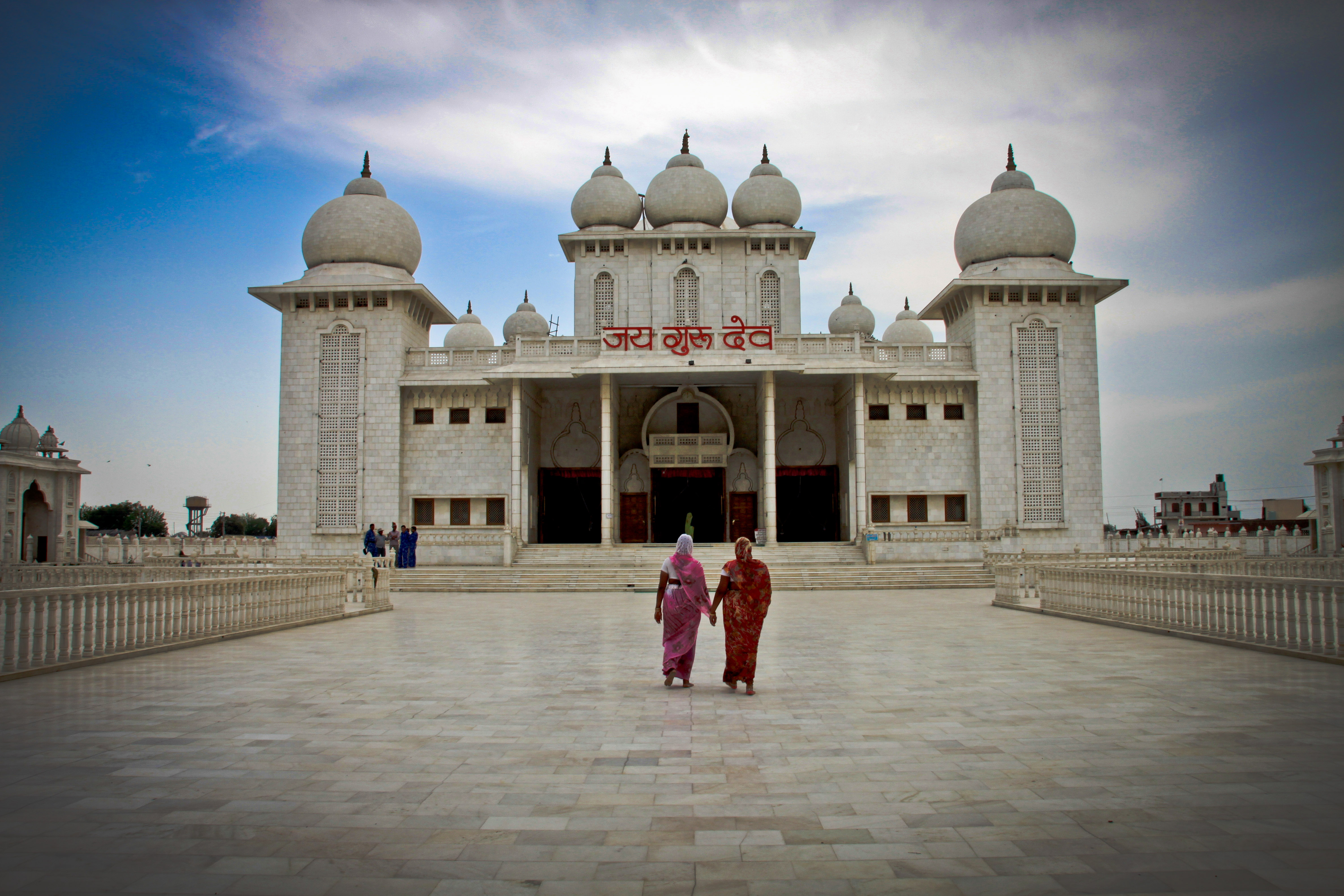
Jai Gurudev Naam Yog Sadhna Mandir, Mathura

Naam Yog Sadhna Mandir (Hindi: नाम योग साधना मंदिर) is a temple in Mathura, India. It was constructed by the guru Jai Gurudev(Baba Jai Gurudev, a well known Spiritual master in Radhasoami Sant Mat spiritual tradition) and is also known as the Jai Gurudev Temple. It is looked after by the organization/trust - Jai Gurudev Dharma Pracharak Sanstha, MATHURA.

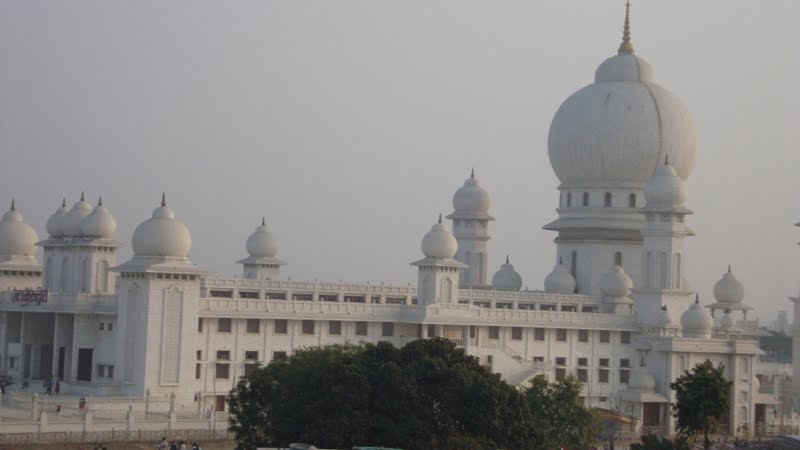
Naam Yog Sadhna Mandir

Every year the temple hosts Bhandara festival attracting millions of participants across the globe.

Naam yog Sadhna Mandir front gate

== Location ==
The temple is located in the Mathura district of Uttar Pradesh on National Highway 2 between Delhi and Agra 50 km from agra. It is approximately 150 kilometres (93 mi) from New Delhi, the capital city of the Republic of India.

== Guru ==
The temple was constructed by Baba Jai Gurudev ji Maharaj in the memory of his guru(spiritual master) pandit Ghurelal Sharma ji. The temple is located in Mathura district, Uttar Pradesh, India. Baba Jai Gurudev ji Maharaj was a spiritual teacher and the founder of the religious/spiritual organization 'Jai Gurudev Dharma Pracharak Sanshtha' located in Mathura district of Uttar pradesh state of India. He preached about meditation for attaining spiritual enlightenment and also the associated religious values. His ashram/organization manages the temple. It also manages a free school for poor children, a free medical dispensary for the needy, etc.

Ghurelal Ji Maharaj, popularly known as 'Dada Guru', came from Chirauli in Aligarh, Uttar Pradesh, India . The temple is said to fulfill one wish if a person vows to give up a bad habit of such a nature that may be sinful or lead to a sinful act. One such habit is drinking alcohol or taking drugs for intoxication purpose. Another habit is habit of killing/eating animals, birds, fishes and eggs. The temple requests visitors not to donate to the temple if they consume egg, meat, fish or consume alcohol/ drugs for intoxication purpose. The message at the donation box reads "People consuming egg, meat, fish and wine are requested not to put in their money."

The temple was constructed by the contribution of the followers in terms of labour(seva) as volunteer and in terms of small amounts of money. It is claimed that the temple has been constructed by contributions from people, ninety percent of whom were below poverty line.

Baba Jai Gurudev ji Maharaj believes that mankind has five weaknesses: lust, anger, greed, attachment and egoism(vanity). He says that we are now humans again after millions of years as "lower" species. We should now get to know ourselves and our creator and return to our original home(Satloka) and to our real Lord(Satpurush), free from pain and misery. He said that the human body is made up of the five elements earth, fire, water, air and sky. He preached a specific way to meditate, namely 'Naam-Yog Sadhana' to achieve spiritual enlightenment. 'Naam-Yog Sadhana' is also known as 'Surat-Shabd Yoga'. 'Surat' means soul. 'Naam/Shabd' connotes heavenly sound. Shadhana/Yoga means meditation. He preached abiding by the rules made by the owner of this world, that is, God/Ishwar/Khuda. That means avoiding doing sins. God also owns the heaven and hell. If your deeds are good you may get some time in heaven. If a person's deeds are sinful, he/she will be sent to hell or lower forms of living beings which are also a mode or form of suffering for the soul. The time in heaven or hell or in lower order living forms will be commensurate with the degree or the amount of good or bad deeds. After it is over, the soul is again send in human form. To avoid cycles of birth and death and the sufferings, one should explore the possibility of spiritual enlightenment through Naam-Yog Sadhana/Surat-Shabd Yoga. and According to Baba Jai Gurudev ji Maharaj killing is a sin. Killing any higher order living being makes a person accumulate a sin. Plants and trees are lower order living beings . Tree or Plant-based foods are cereals, fruits, vegetables, etc. Along with milk and honey forms the vegetarian foods according to the Baba Jai Gurudev ji. He states that eating vegetarian food is something that is admissible as non-sinful. Vegetarian food according to Baba Jai Gurudev ji Maharaj includes all vegetables, fruits, cereals, milk, honey and suchlike. He preaches complete abstinence from food items that may contain like egg, meat and fish. The definition of vegetarian does not include egg, meat or fish. He also preaches complete abstinence from alcohol or any other intoxicating substance like marijuana, drugs, etc. The reason given is that under the influence of alcohol/drugs, a person is more prone to doing a sin. Apart from these, standard teachings include being honest and ethical, kind towards others, being generous, providing service(seva) or help to the needy based on your capabilities, etc.
