= Anand Swarup =

Fifth Sant Satguru of Radhasoami Faith and Founder of Dayalbagh

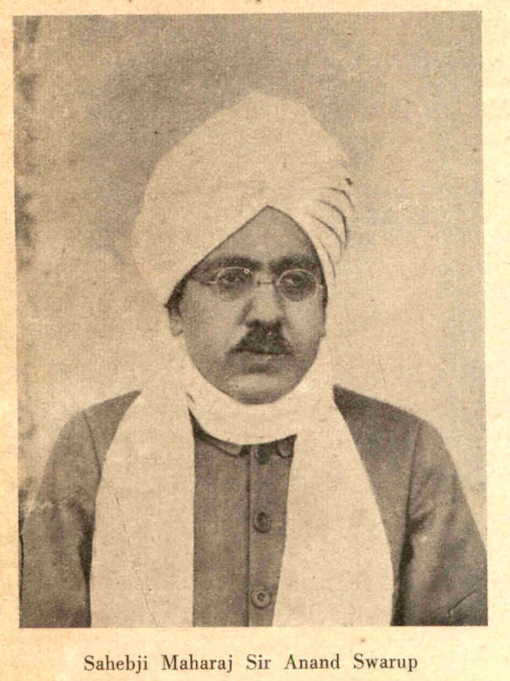
- Title: Spiritual Teacher (Sant Satguru)

Personal life
- Born: 6 August 1881 Ambala, Punjab, British India
- Died: 24 June 1937 (aged 55) Agra, United Provinces, British India (present-day Uttar Pradesh, India)
- Other names: Param Purush Puran Dhani Sahab Ji Mahraj, Huzur Sahab Ji Maharaj

Religious life
- Religion: Sant SatGuru Of Radha Soami Sect
- Sect: Sant Mat Radhasoami

Senior posting
- Based in: Agra, Uttar Pradesh, India
- Period in office: (1913-1937)
- Predecessor: Kamta Prasad Sinha
- Successor: Gurcharan Das Mehta

Anand Swarup (6 August 1881 – 24 June 1937), honorifically known as Param Guru Huzur Sahab Ji Maharaj, was the founder of Dayalbagh and the fifth revered leader, or Sant Satguru of Radhasoami faith also known as Radhasoami Satsang Dayalbagh and Spiritual Head of Radhasoami Satsang Sabha. He succeeded Sarkar Sahab in 1913.

He also laid the foundation of Radha Soami Educational Institute (REI), a co-educational middle school which opened in 1917 and later expanded and developed as Dayalbagh Educational Institute(Deemed University). He was knighted in the 1936 New Year Honours. for founding Dayalbagh.

== Early life ==
He was born on 6 August 1881 in a Sikh Ahluwalia mercantile family belonging to Ambala.

== Literature ==
He wrote many holy books on the Radha Soami sect, explaining the concepts of Surat Shabd Yoga and objectives of Radha Soami in general. A composition of beautiful and inspiring Hymns named 'PREM BILAS' was brought out during His life time.A magazine named 'PREM PRACHARAK' was also published from Dayal Bagh. It contained the day-to-day discourses of Param Guru Sahabji Maharaj and other activities of Satsang. Lists of his Holy Books published by Radhasoami Satsang Sabha :

1. Prem Bilas
2. Radhasoami Mat Darshan
3. Prem Sandesh
4. Bhagvad Geeta Ke Updesh
5. Amrit Bachan
6. Satsang Ke Updesh
7. Jigyasa
8. Yatharth Prakash
9. Sharanashram Ka Shapoot
10. Swarajy
11. Sansar Chakr
12. Deen Va Duniya

== Teachings ==
Huzur Sahabji Maharaj founded Dayalbagh - Garden of the Merciful, the Spiritual Home of Satsangis which is an envy of the heavens on 20 January 1915 on Basant Panchami Day. He spread the Message of Satsang to the four corners of the country and showed that it is possible to bring about fusion of traditional mysticism and modern science and technology. He told us that Better Worldliness rather than unworldliness should be our ideal. We should not become unmindful of our social responsibilities and duties as a citizen in our religious pursuits. We should follow the ideal of Fatherhood of God and Brotherhood of Man if we want peace in the world. He composed Prem Bilas and Yathartha Prakasa and Bhagwad Gita ke Updesh clarified the true meaning of our old scriptures and how they are in line with the concepts and philosophy of Sant Mat.He left for His Heavenly Abode on 24 June 1937.

== Radhasoami Satsang Dayalbagh ==
Located at: Dayalbagh, Agra. Lineage: Shiv Dayal Singh (Soami Ji Maharaj)- Salig Ram(Huzur Maharaj)— Brahm Shankar Misra(Maharaj Sahab) — Kamta Prasad Sinha(Sarkar Sahab) — Anand Swarup (Sahab Ji Maharaj, Founder of Dayalbagh) — Gurcharan Das Mehta(Mehta Ji Maharaj) — Makund Behari Lal(Lal Sahab) — Prem Saran Satsangi(Satsangi Sahab). Dayalbagh was founded by Anand Swarup, Kt. The present Guru Prem Saran Satsangi is an emeritus professor, physicist and system scientist of IIT Delhi. The 200th birth anniversary of Shiv Dayal Singh was celebrated in Dayalbagh from August 2017 to 24 August 2018.

== See also ==
- Radha Soami Satsang Dayalbagh lineage
  - Param Guru Soami Ji Maharaj (1818–1878)
  - Param Guru Huzur Maharaj (1829–1898)
  - Param Guru Maharaj Sahab (1861–1907)
  - Param Guru Sarkar Sahab (1871–1913)
  - Param Guru Sahab Ji Maharaj (1881–1937)
  - Param Guru Mehta Ji Maharaj (1885–1975)
  - Param Guru Lal Sahab (1907–2002)
  - Param Guru Satsangi Sahab (1937 – present
- Contemporary Sant Mat movements
- Sant Mat

== Notes ==
Radha Soami Sect – History and Tenets. Radha Soami Satsang (Publisher), 2nd ed, Agra, 1988
