= Radha Soami =

Sant Mat–based spiritual movement or faith

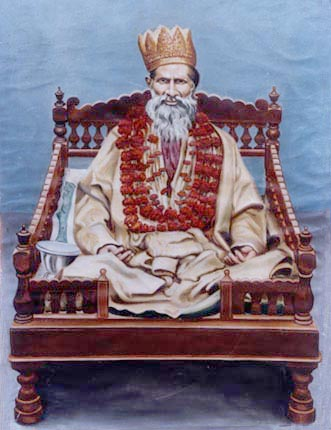
- Shiv Dayal Singh, a.k.a. Soami Ji Maharaj

Total population
- c. 3,000,000

Founder
- Shiv Dayal Singh (1861)

Regions with significant populations
- Agra, Uttar Pradesh, India
- Beas, Punjab, India

Religions
- Sant Mat (non-denominational)

Scriptures
- Sar Bachan

Languages
- Hindi • Punjabi • English

Rādhā Soāmī Mat or Sant Mat is a spiritual tradition or faith founded by spiritual master Shiv Dayal Singh Ji Maharaj in January 1861 on Basant Panchami Day in Agra, India.

Shiv Dayal Singh's parents were Vaishnava Hindus, followers of Guru Nanak of Sikhism, and were also followers of a spiritual guru from Hathras named Tulsi Sahib. Shiv Dayal Singh was influenced by the teachings of Tulsi Sahib, who taught Surat Shabd Yoga (which is defined by Radha Soami teachers as "union of the soul with the divine, inner sound"); guru bhakti ("devotion to the master"); and high moral living, including a strict lacto-vegetarian diet. Shiv Dayal Singh frequently accompanied Tulsi Saheb, but did not take initiation from him. The movement does not promote celibacy, and most of the masters in its various lineages have been married. The teachings seem to be related to forms of 18th- and 19th-century esoteric mysticism that were circulating at the time in northern India. The founding date of the movement is considered to be 1861 when Shiv Dayal Singh began publicly to give discourses.

As per some subtraditions, it derives its name from the word Radha Soami means Lord of the Soul. "Radha Soami" is used to indicate towards Shiv Dayal Singh. The followers of Shiv Dayal Singh used to consider him the Living Master and incarnation of Radhasoami Dayal. After his death, Salig Ram and his other followers started the Radha Soami movement, which later got separated into different branches/denominations, including the Radha Soami Satsang Soami Bagh Agra, Radha Soami Satsang Beas, Radha Soami Satsang Dayalbagh, Radhasoami Satsang Pipal Mandi, and Radha Swami Satsang Dinod.

== Nomenclature ==
According to Mark Juergensmeyer, the term Radha Soami literally refers to Radha as the soul and Soami (swami, lord). According to Salig Ram, quotes Juergensmeyer, these terms are symbolic and mean "master of energy", derived from the Vaishnava understanding of "Radha as the power of energy of God" (Shakti). It is a referent to the consciousness in a person and the cosmic energy source, states Juergensmeyer.

The writings of Shiv Dayal Singh, Sar Bachan, use the term Sat Nam, rather than Radha Soami. The gurus and the tradition that followed him used the term Radha Soami during the initiation rites, meditation practices and as mutual greeting. This has led to the fellowship being commonly called Radha Soami. In some subtraditions of Radha Soami, states Lucy DuPertuis, the guru's charisma is considered as the "formless absolute", being in his presence is equivalent to experiencing the incarnation of the Satguru, the guru is identified as the Radha Soami.

== Founder ==
The Radha Soami tradition can be traced back to the spiritual master Shiv Dayal Singh (honorifically titled Soami Ji Maharaj) who was born on August 25, 1818, in the north Indian city of Agra. His parents were followers of Guru Nanak of Sikhism and a spiritual guru Tulsi Saheb from Hathras. After completing his education, Shiv Dayal Singh gained employment as a Persian language translator, left that role and spent increasing amount of his time to religious pursuits. He was influenced by the teachings of Tulsi Sahib of Hathras, who taught Surat Shabd Yoga (which is defined by Radha Soami teachers as "union of the soul with the divine, inner sound"); guru bhakti ("devotion to the master"); and high moral living, including a strict lacto-vegetarian diet. He accompanied Tulsi Saheb a lot. He did not take initiation from him, however. The founding date of the movement is considered to be 1861 when Shiv Dayal Singh began publicly to give discourses.

== Beliefs and practices ==
To the Radhasoamis, six elements form the framework of their organisation:

- a living guru (someone as locus of trust and truth),
- bhajan (remembering Sat Nam, other practices believed to be transformative),
- satsang (fellowship, community),
- seva (serve others without expecting anything in return),
- kendra (community organisation, shrine), and
- bhandara (large community gathering).

The Radha Soami Satsang believes that living gurus are necessary for a guided spiritual life. They do not install the Guru Granth Sahib ji or any other scriptures in their sanctum, as they consider it ritualistic opposing the fundamental sikh beliefs. Instead, the proclaimed guru sits in the sanctum with the satsang (group of faithfuls) and they listen to preachings from the Adi Granth and sing hymns together. They believe in social equality, forbid caste distinctions and have also attracted Dalits to their tradition. They are active outside India too.

They are active in charitable work such as providing free medical services and help to the needy. They do not believe in orthodox Sikh ritual practices such as covering one's head inside the temple or removing shoes, nor do they serve karah prasad (offering) at the end of prayers. Their basic practices include Surat Shabd Yoga (meditation on inner light and sound), initiation of disciple into the path by a living guru, obedience to the guru, a moral life that is defined by abstinence from meat, drugs, alcohol and sex outside marriage. They also believe that jivanmukti or inner liberation is possible during one's lifetime with guidance of the living guru. However, some of these practices vary depending on the branches of the Radha Soami sect (Beas, Dayalbagh, Dinod).

=== Vegetarianism ===
The Radha Soami are strict lacto-vegetarians for ethical and spiritual reasons. They do not consume eggs, meat, seafood or alcohol. In Radhasoami vegetarianism, all life forms are respected and meat is considered unethical. Meat is also said to produce bad karma from those who slaughter the animal and those who buy and consume the products.

Radha Soami hold the view that eggs are essentially a fetus whether they are fertilised or not; thus are non-vegetarian. Eggs and meat are believed to incite animal instincts and impair spiritual growth.

== Living Masters ==
Radhasoami Satsang Dayalbagh Agra : The present Sant Satguru of Radhasoami Satsang Dayalbagh Agra is Param Guru Prof. Prem Saran Satsangi Sahab Ji Maharaj.

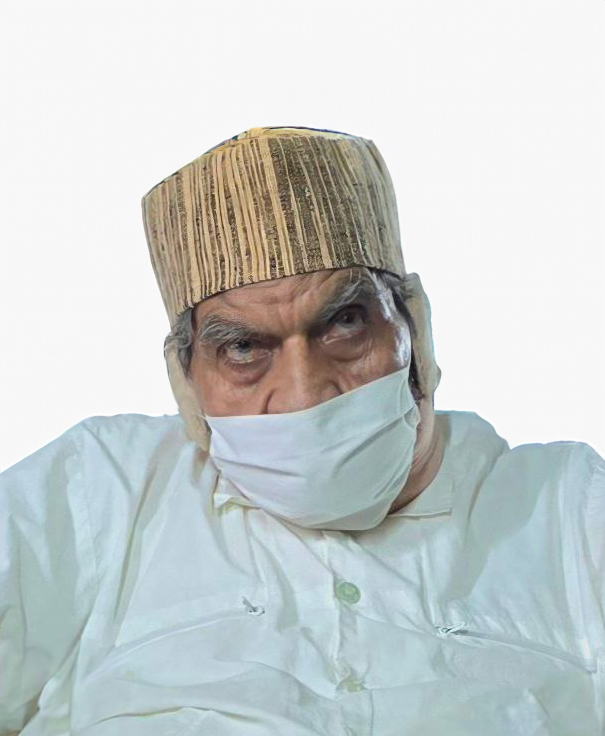
Param Guru Huzur Satsangi Sahab (Gracious Huzur), the successor of Huzur Lal Sahab, succeeded him as the spiritual head of Radha Soami Satsang Dayalbagh.

Radha Soami Satsang Beas : The present Satguru or Baba Ji of Radha Soami Satsang Beas is Baba Gurinder Singh Ji Maharaj.

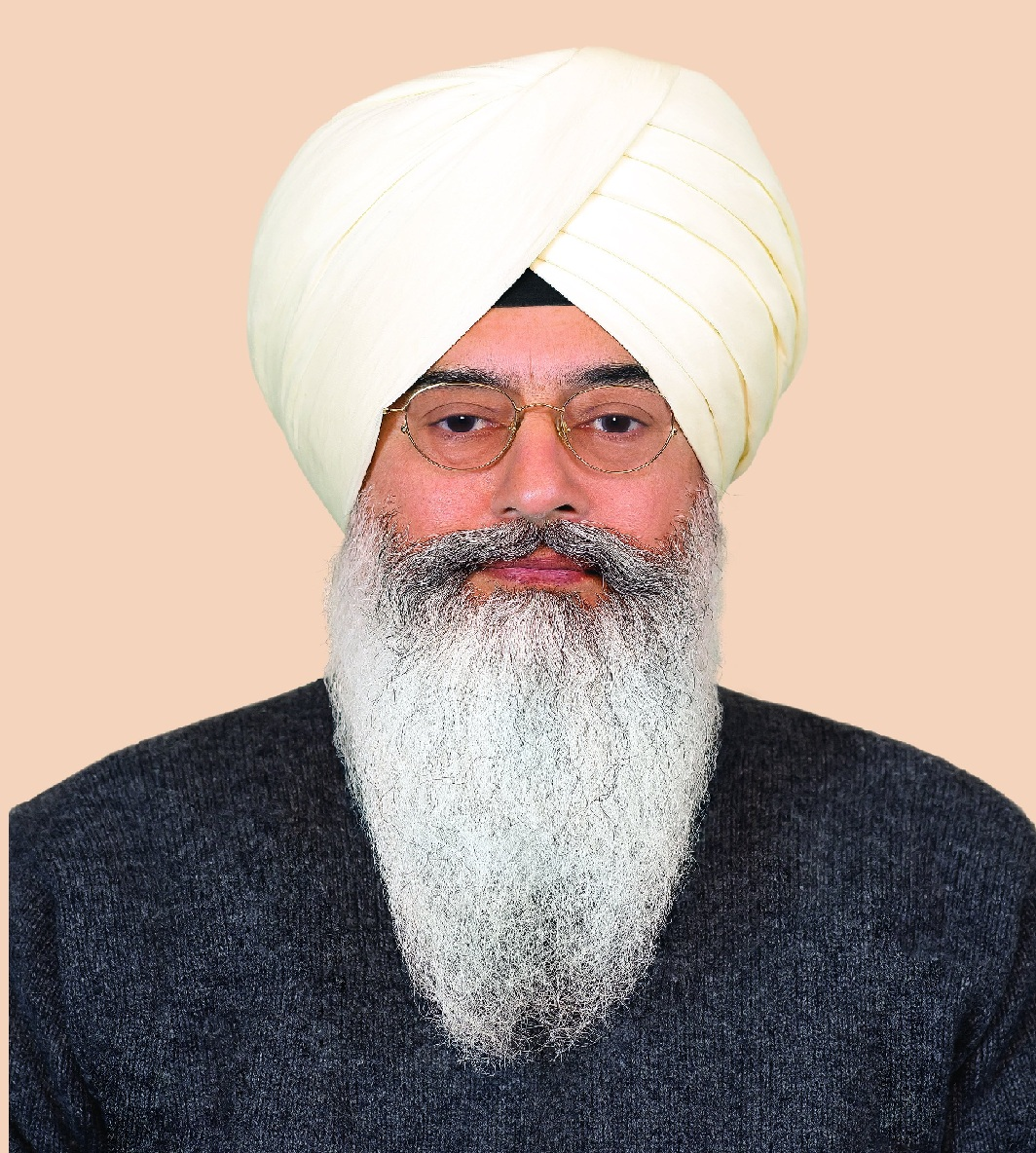
Baba Gurinder Singh Ji (Baba Ji), the successor of Baba Charan Singh succeeded him as the spiritual head of Radha Soami Satsang Beas.

== Successors and branches ==
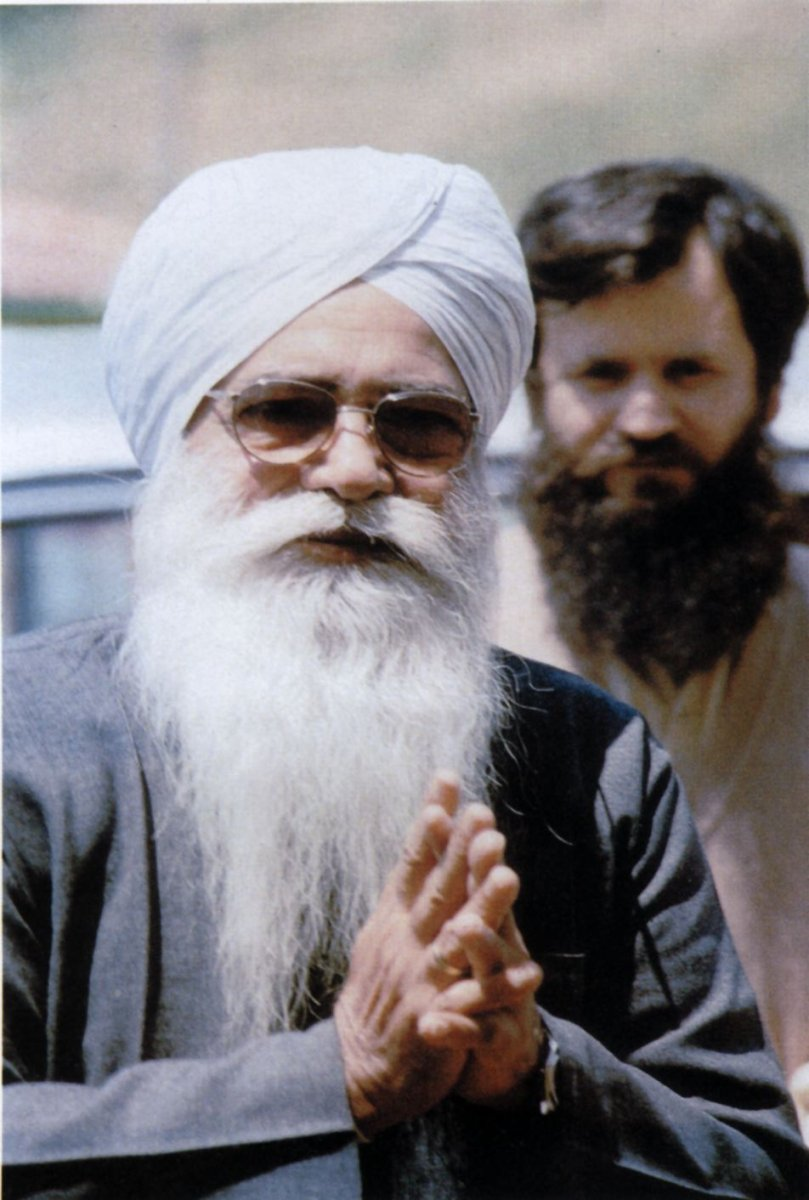
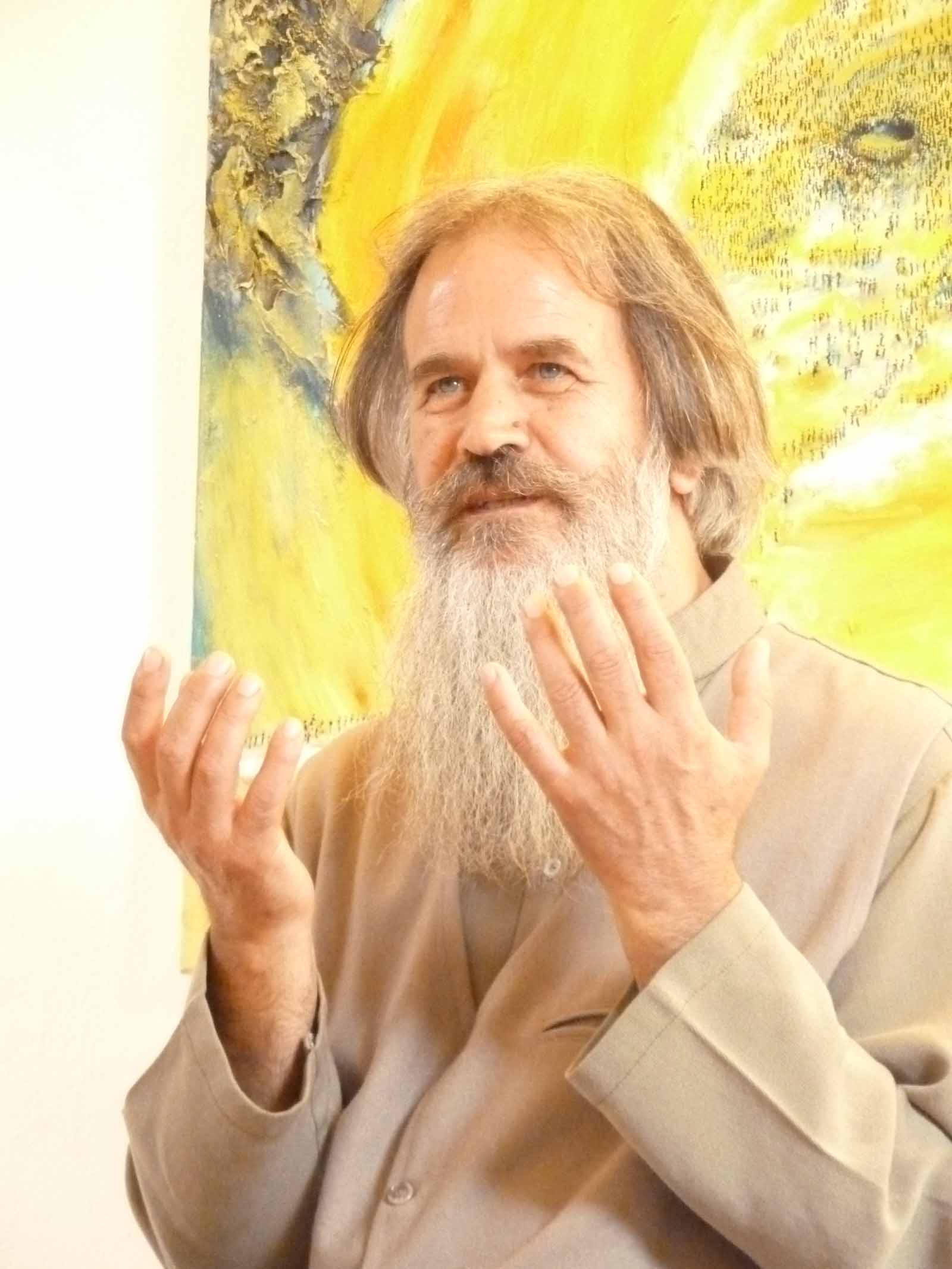
Radha Soami fellowships and sects have featured gurus from many parts of the world.

Param Purush Puran Dhani Soamiji Maharaj (Shiv Dayal Singh), the Incarnation of Radhasoami Dayal, Who declared Satang open to all by a proclamation 150 years ago (Basant Panchami,1861), became the Primal Founder of the Radhasoami Faith. But even from the time of his departure, some differences presented to surface. He had given a special authority to some of His followers whereby they could give initiations into Radhasoami Faith in their respective regions. Among such select personalities Baba Jaimal Singh was one in whose name, some time later, his successor-disciple Savan Singh Sahab established Dera Jaimal Singh, Beas. Baba Jaimal Singh used to come to Satsang during the time of not only Param Purush Puran Dhani Soamiji Maharaj but also during the time of Param Guru Huzur Maharaj (Rai Saligram Sahab) and to a large extent, during the time of Maharaj Sahab (Mishra Sahab)also. But when the Central Administrative Council was established and the accounts of properties were being called and information was sought as to who were the persons initiated, he did not like this idea and gradually became separated from Radhasoami Satsang Agra (then Allahabad) and began to organise their tradition in an independent way. But they maintained the basic teachings of Radhasoami Faith intact and they have not changed the method of practice of Surat Shabda Yoga. And then, after the departure of Maharaj Sahab, the dissenting members of Allahabad formed into a separate group who came to be known later as Soamibagh Satsang with only a following of five Branches from among 116 Branches existing at that time while the main lot followed Param Guru Sarkar Sahab(Kamta Prasad Sinha Sahab) Who commanded the support of all other Branches (i.e. 111 out of 116) and were said to belong to Ghazipur Satsang at that's time and later after the establish ment of headquarters became known as Dayalbagh Satsang.

After Shiv Dayal Singh 's death in 1878 he was succeeded by several disciples, including his wife Narayan Devi ("Radhaji"); his brother Partap Singh ("Chachaji Saheb"); Sanmukh Das (appointed head of the sadhus); the army havildar/sergeant Baba Jaimal Singh, Gharib Das of Delhi; and the postmaster general of the Northwest provinces, Salig Ram (alias Rai Salig Ram), each of whom started their own distinct centers. According to some scholars, Shiv Dayal Singh passed leadership to Salig Ram. After their deaths, multiple followers were claimed to be the rightful heirs, and this eventually led to a large proliferation of various masters and satsangs ("fellowships") throughout India that were regarded by their followers to be the true manifestations of Shiv Dayal Singh and his teachings, described as Sant Mat ("the path of the saints").

The masters gave birth to over 20 lineages (guru-shishya traditions), most of which already disappeared. The most famous living branches are Radha Soami Satsang Soami Bagh Agra, Radha Soami Satsang Beas, Radha Soami Satsang Dayalbagh, and Ruhani Satsang.

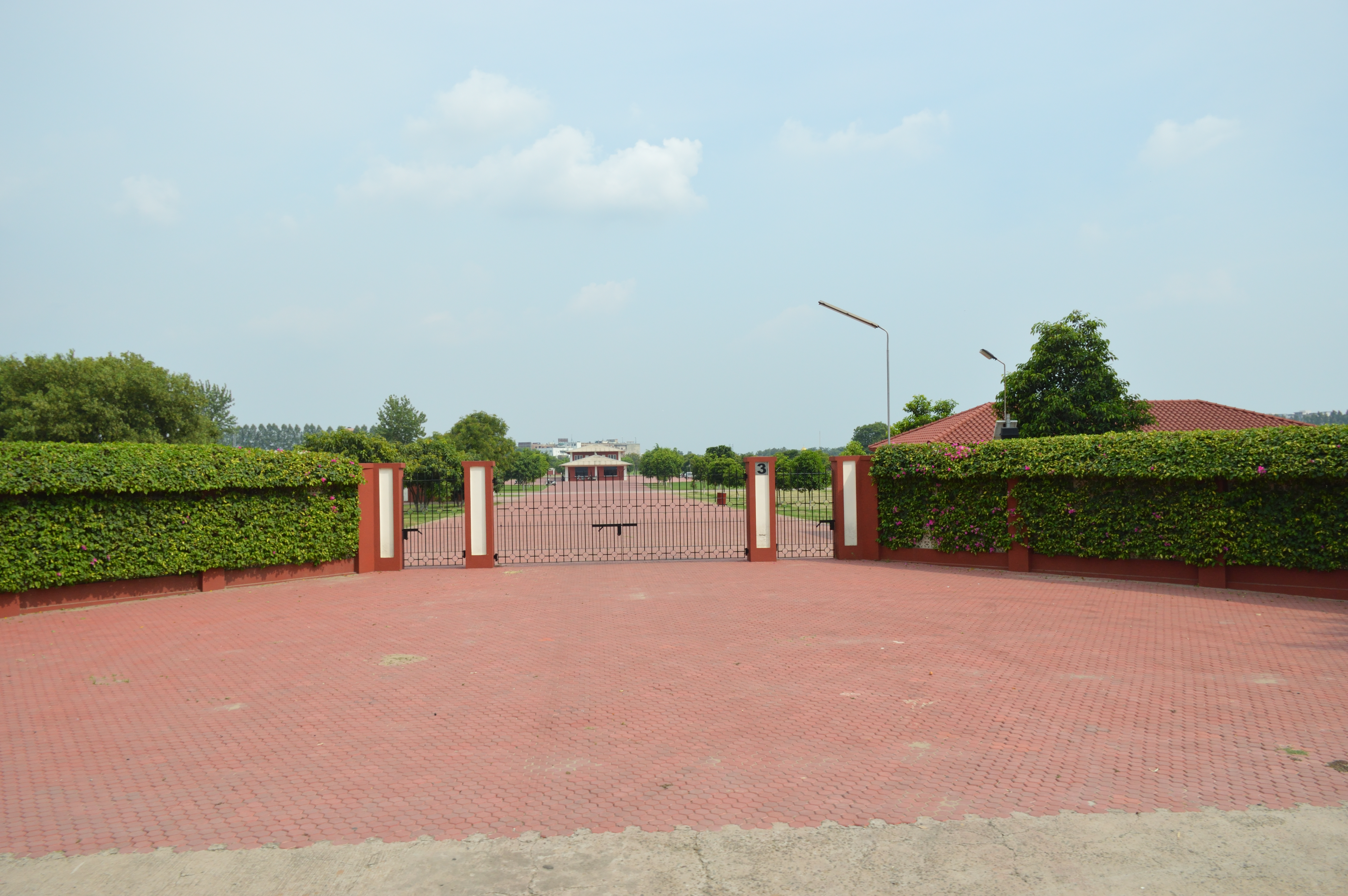
The Radha Soami Satsang Beas based out of Beas, Punjab, India is the largest group.

The largest branch is the Radha Soami Satsang Beas (RSSB) with the headquarters in Beas City, established by one of Shiv Dayal Singh 's disciples, Jaimal Singh, in the North Indian state of Punjab in the 1891, who practised Surat Shabd Yoga on the bank of river Beas. The Beas has grown enormously over the decades under the guiding hands of each subsequent successor (from Sawan Singh to Sardar Bahadur Maharaj Jagat Singh and Maharaj Charan Singh to the current master, Gurinder Singh). There are estimated to be two million initiates of the Beas masters worldwide. The one of a split the Beas is Dera Sacha Sauda (1948) led by Mastana Balochistani. In Agra, the birthplace of the movement, there are three main satsang centers of branches. The Radha Soami Satsang Soami Bagh Agra with center at Soami Bagh occupies the original site in Agra, where a large memorial tomb is being built to honor the movement founder, and administered by the Central Administrative Council which established by second successor Maharaj Saheb in 1902. The second center is Peepal Mandi, which was founded by Rai Salig Ram who was then succeeded by his son, grandson, and currently his great-grandson, Agam Prasad Mathur. And the largest of the Agra-based branches is Radhasoami Satsang Dayalbagh with center at Dayalbagh, which is located across the street from Soami Bagh. This branch was founded in 1907 at Ghazipur by Kamta Prasad Sinha and in 1913 the headquarters were moved to Agra, it has flourished under the following leadership of Anand Sarup, Gurcharandas Mehta, Dr. M.B. Lal Sahab, and most recently as of this date Prof. Prem Saran Satsangi.

The Ruhani Satsang (a.k.a. Kirpal Light Satsang) in Delhi, founded by Kirpal Singh, a disciple of the Beas master, Sawan Singh, became popular in the United States under the leadership of Thakar Singh. The Ruhani Satsang followed by the Sawan Kirpal Ruhani Mission and its international organisation Science of Spirituality (SOS), founded by Kipral Singh's son.

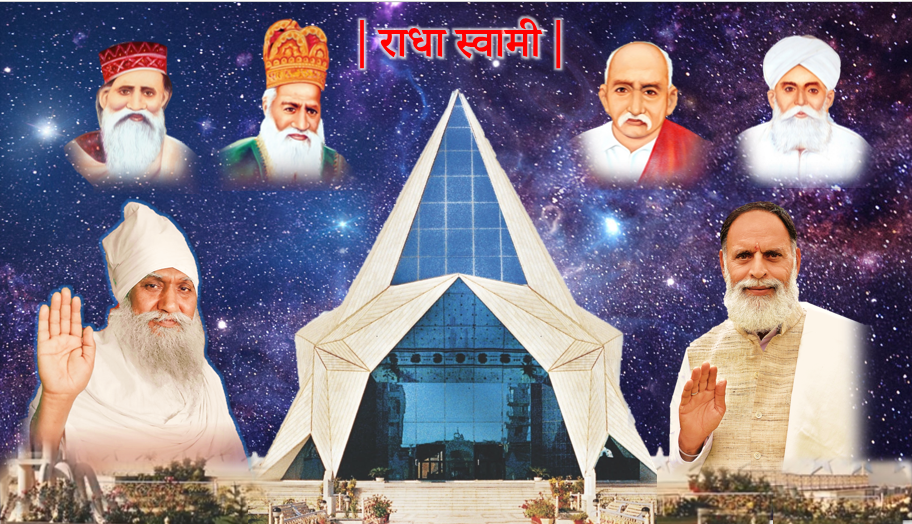
Radha Swami Satsang Dinod, lineage.

Other Radha Soami subtraditions and groups that have garnered a significant following include Manavta Mandir, established by Baba Faqir Chand in 1962 at Hoshiarpur in the Punjab; the Tarn Taran satsang founded by Bagga Singh; Radha Swami Satsang Dinod, founded by Param Sant Tarachand Ji Maharaj (Bade Maharaj Ji), current master Param Sant Huzur Kanwar Saheb Ji Maharaj and several others scattered through North and South India.

In addition, there are Radha Soami-influenced, derived from the Radha Soami often westernised groups but denies their connection, namely the Eckankar led by Paul Twitchell (a former disciple of Kirpal Singh), the similar American syncretistic Movement of Spiritual Inner Awareness of John-Roger Hinkins, the linked to the Beas Elan Vital (formerly Divine Light Mission), established by Hans Maharaj, and "Quan Yin method" of Ching Hai (a female student of Thakar Singh).

=== List of notable gurus ===
General founder

- Shiv Dayal Singh

==== Radha Soami subtraditions ====
Radha Soami Satsang Beas lineage

- Jaimal Singh
- Sawan Singh
- Sardar Bahadur Maharaj Jagat Singh
- Maharaj Charan Singh
- Gurinder Singh
- Jasdeep Singh Gill

Radha Soami Satsang Dayalbagh lineage

- Param Guru Soami Ji Maharaj (1818-1878)
- Param Guru Huzur Maharaj (1829-1898)
- Param Guru Maharaj Sahab (1861-1907)
- Param Guru Sarkar Sahab (1871-1913)
- Param Guru Sahab Ji Maharaj (1881-1937)
- Param Guru Mehta Ji Maharaj (1885-1975)
- Param Guru Lal Sahab (1907-2002)
- Param Guru Satsangi Sahab (1937–Present)

Satsang (Deoghar) Lineage

- Soami Ji Maharaj
- Huzur Maharaj
- Maharaj Sahab
- Anukulchandra (Sri Sri Thakur Anukulchandra )

Shabd Pratap Satsang Lineage

- Soami Ji Maharaj
- Chacha Ji Maharaj
- Data Dayal Ji Maharaj

Jay Gurudev Satsang Mathura/Ujjain Lineage

- Soami Ji Maharaj
- Huzur Maharaj
- Garib Das
- Jai Baba Gurudev

Ruhani Satsang lineage

- Kirpal Singh
- Thakar Singh
- Manavta Mandir
- Baba Faqir Chand
- Bhagat Munshi Ram
- Manav Dayal I.C.Sharma

Others

- Maharishi Shiv Brat Lal

==== Radha Soami-related groups ====
Dera Sacha Sauda

- Mastana Baluchistani
- Shah Satnam Singh
- Paul Twitchell
- Elan Vital
- Hans Maharaj
- Prem Rawat

Movement of Spiritual Inner Awareness

- John-Roger Hinkins
- Science of Spirituality
- Darshan Singh
- Rajinder Singh

Others

- Ching Hai

== See also ==
- Contemporary Sant Mat movements

== Primary sources ==
- Singh Ji Maharaj, Seth Shiv Dayal (1934). Sar Bachan: An abstract of the teachings of Soami Ji Maharaj, the founder of the Radha Soami system of philosophy and spiritual science: The yoga of the Sound Current. Translated by Seva Singh and Julian Johnson from Hindi to English (9th ed.). Beas: Radha Soami Satsang Beas.
