= Saligrama (disambiguation) =

Saligrama is a sacred stone in Hinduism.

Saligrama or Saligram may also refer to:

- Saligram, Nepal, a village development committee
- Saligrama, Udupi, a town in Karnataka, India
- Saligrama, Mysore, a town in Karnataka, India
- Saligramam, a neighborhood in Chennai, Tamil Nadu, India
- Shaligram Ramnarayanpur (community development block), Jharkhand, India
- Salig Ram (1829–1898), spiritual leader of the Radhasoami Faith
- Salig Ram (politician), Indian politician from Himachal Pradesh
- Saligram Jaiswal, Indian freedom fighter and politician
- Saligrama Krishna Ramachandra Rao, Indian scholar
- Shaligram Yadav, Indian politician
