= Shiv Dayal Singh =

Founder and First Sant Satguru of Radha Soami Faith

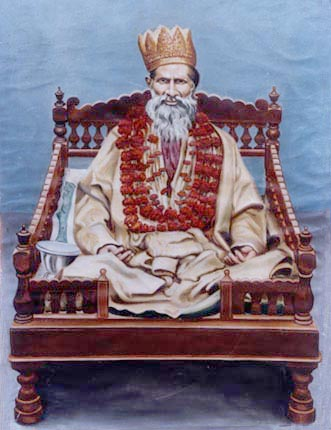
- Title: Sant Sat Guru

Personal life
- Born: 24 August 1818 Panni Gali, Agra, Ceded Provinces, British India
- Died: 15 June 1878 (aged 59) Panni Gali, Agra, North-Western Provinces, British India
- Spouse: Naraini Devi
- Children: None
- Other name: Param Purush Puran Dhani Huzur Soami Ji Maharaj (honorific used by devotees)

Religious life
- Religion: Radha Soami, Sant Mat
- Sect: Sant Tradition of North India
- Profession: Founder and first spiritual leader of Radha Soami Sant Mat

Senior posting
- Period in office: 1861-1878
- Successor: Salig Ram
- Influenced by: Tulsi Sahib
- Influenced: Salig Ram, Jaimal Singh, Anukulchandra Chakravarty

Shiv Dayal Singh (24 August 1818 – 15 June 1878) known by the honorific "Param Purush Puran Dhani Huzur Soami Ji Maharaj" by his disciples and devotees, was an Indian spiritual guru and founder of Radha Soami, a 19th-century spiritual sect.

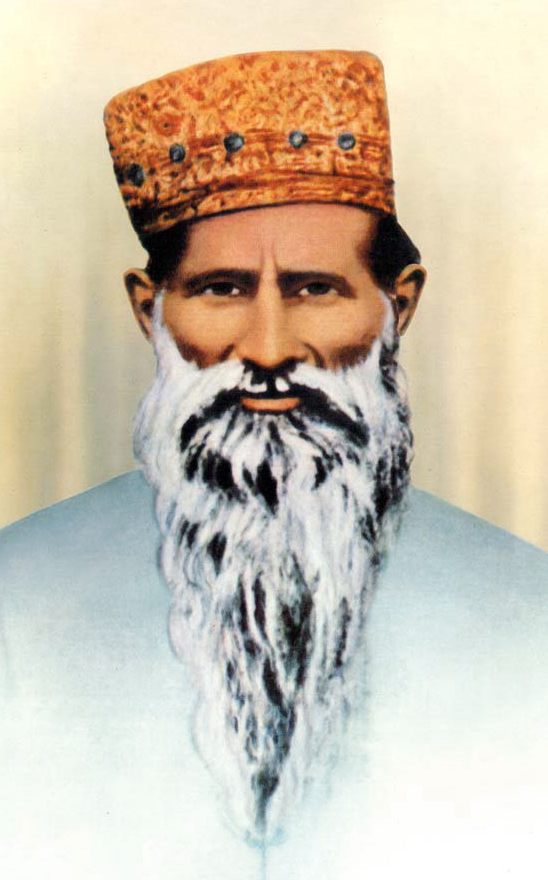

== Early life ==
The parents of Shiv Dayal Singh were residents of Punjab, but moved to Agra before his birth at the behest of the colonial British government who had set up a major military centre there and relied heavily on Sikhs from the Punjab region to staff the base. At the age of five, Shiv Dayal Singh was sent to school where he learnt Hindi, Urdu, Persian and Gurumukhi, Arabic and Sanskrit. His father, Seth Dilwali Singh was a Sahejdhari Khatri. His mother's name was Mata Maha Maya. He had two brothers named Seth Partap Singh (alias Chachaji Saheb) and Seth Rai Bindraban. His marriage to Mata Naraini Devi (later called "Radha Ji" by followers and devotees), daughter of Lala Izzat Rai of Faridabad was arranged at an early age. He had no children. His family were devout Vaishnavite Hindus. During Shiv Dayal Singh's childhood, the family also sought the spiritual tutelage of as a living guru from Tulsi Sahib. But, he didn't take initiation from him. Shiv Dayal Singh acquired no spiritual guru in his life.

== Adulthood ==
After Shiv Dayal Singh completed his education, he became a Persian language translator to a government officer. He left the job and became a teacher of Persian language. Once his brother gained an employment at Indian post office, he left his Persian language job, and joined his father's moneylending business. He spent increasing amount of his time, to religious pursuits. He began giving spiritual discourses based on the scriptures of Sikhism and writings of Tulsi Sahib of Hathras.

== Practice ==
After the death of Sant Tulsi Saheb in 1843, Shiv Dayal Singh practised Surat Shabd Yoga for 17 years in almost total seclusion in a room within a room. He started holding Satsang (spiritual discourse) publicly on Vasant Panchami (a spring festival) in 1861, and continued for 17 years. Thus Basant Panchami is a very special day for the followers of the Radhasoami Faith.

== Teachings ==
Shiv Dayal Singh originally referred to the Supreme Being with the names "Sat Nām" (True Name) and "Anāmi" (Nameless). The term Rādhāsoāmi was used after Salig Ram became a disciple. On the request of Salig Ram, Singh declared Satsang open on the dat of Basant Panchami in 1861. The spiritual practice taught by Shiv Dayal Singh is called as Surat Shabd Yoga by his followers. He used to consider Sat Nām, Sār Nām, Sār Shabad, Sat Purush and Sat Lok the same thing, which he would call formless. Shiv Dayal Singh also used to smoke Huqqa and asked his disciples to prepare it for a guru as a service.

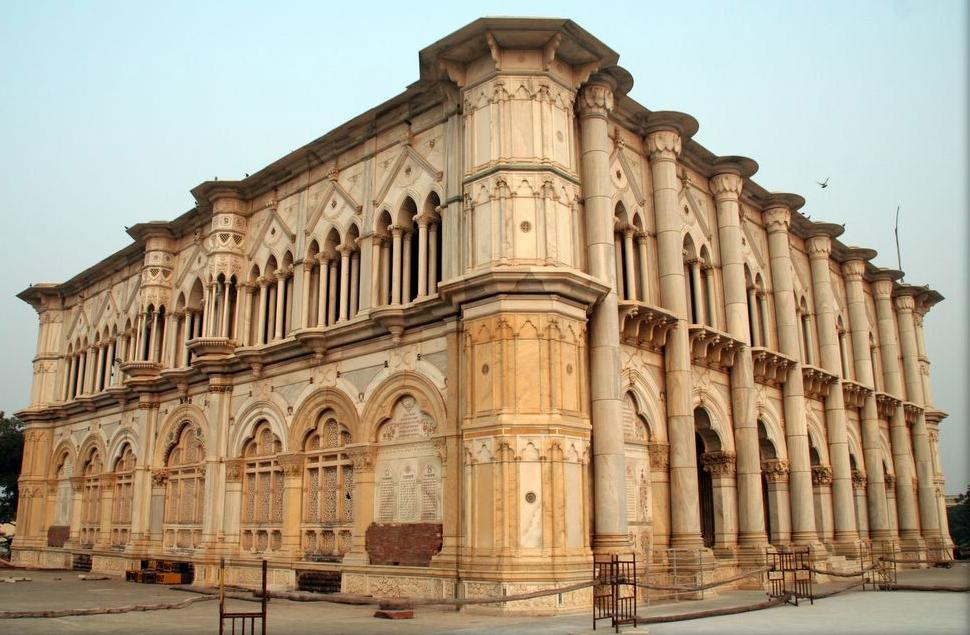
Soami Bagh - Shiv Dayal Singh's Samadh

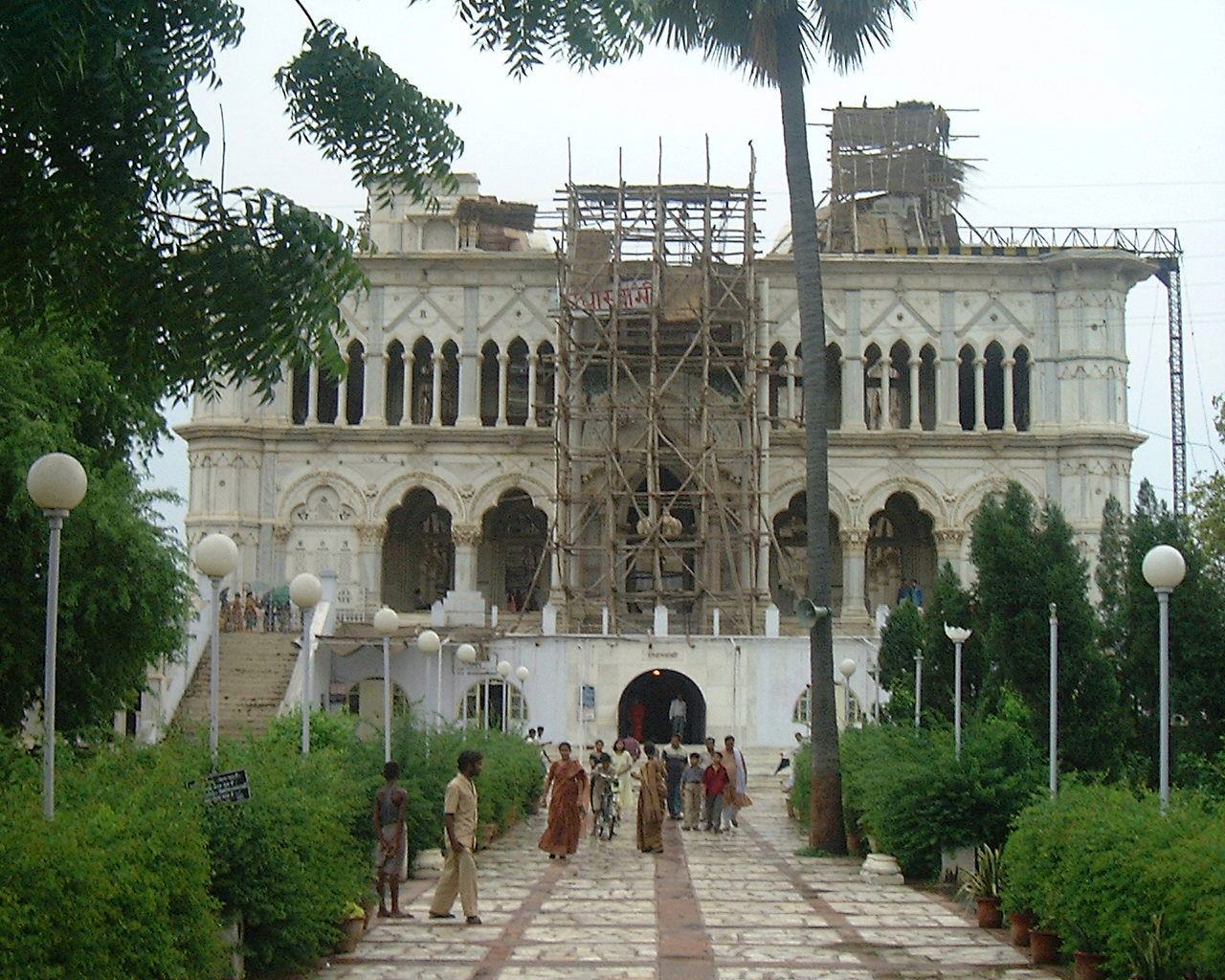
Soami Bagh in 2001

His bani (poetical compositions) and sayings from satsang were published in two books after he died. Both are called Sar Bachan or Sar Vachan (meaning 'conclusive utterances'):

- Sar Vachan Vartik (Sar Bachan in prose)
- Sar Vachan Chhand Band (Sar Bachan in verse)

Sar Vachan Vartik is in two parts: part one being an introduction written by Salig Ram and part two compiled of notes taken from the discourses of Shiv Dayal Singh, which he delivered in satsang up to 1878. They cover important teachings of the faith. His poems in Sar Vachan Chhand Band are replete with emotional appeal - a blending of popular poetic expressions from different languages of north India such as, Khari-Boli, Awadhi, Brijbhasha, Rajasthani and Gurumukhi.

== Soami Bagh and Dayal Bagh ==
The locality called "Soami Bagh" ("Soami Ji's Garden"), the former home of Shiv Dayal Singh and the present location of his tomb-shrine, is currently owned by the Radha Soami Satsang Agra branch, and controlled by the twin organisations known as the Radhasoami Satsang Central Administrative Council and the Radhasoami Trust (called "the Council and the Trust" for short). Its across-the-street neighbour "Dayalbagh" ("Garden of the Merciful") is owned and controlled by the organisation Radha Soami Satsang Dayalbagh. Dayal Bagh and its founder-guru Anand Swarup, Kt. were broadcast to the Western public by Paul Brunton in his famed A Search in Secret India. Sir Anand Swarup received a knighthood for the massive social construction work performed at Dayal Bagh. The two organisations, Council/Trust and Dayalbagh, are both existent and functioning. The major dispute between the two groups is due to two divergent views: The members of Council/Trust claim that Council/Trust is the "parent stock" of Radhasoami faith. The members of Dayalbagh Sabha want access to the tomb-shrine of Shiv Dayal Singh. The tomb-shrine (called ‘Samadh’), was built over 100 years by efforts of the Council/Trust. Soami Bagh Council/Trust allows all satsangis and tourists to visit Samadh, but does not allow religious processions in the Holy Samadh from anyone outside the Council/Trust. In this light, Dayalbagh Sabha organised "SPIRICON 2010", a conference of various organisations who revere Shiv Dayal Singh (boycotted by Council/Trust), to promote mutual respect and to petition access to the tomb-shrine of Shiv Dayal Singh.

== See also ==
- Contemporary Sant Mat movements
- Maharaj Sahab
- Kamta Prasad Sinha
- Gurcharan Das Mehta
- Makund Behari Lal
- Prem Saran Satsangi
