= Maharaj Sahab =

Third revered Sant Satguru of the Radhasoami faith

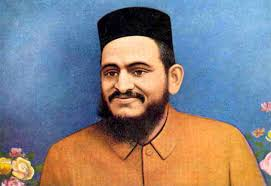
- Title: Spiritual Teacher (Sant Satguru)

Personal life
- Born: 28 March 1861 Banaras, Uttarpradesh
- Died: 12 October 1907 (aged 46) Banaras, Uttarpradesh
- Other name: Param Purush Puran Dhani Maharaj Sahab

Religious life
- Religion: Sant SatGuru Of Radha Soami Sect
- Sect: Sant Mat Radhasoami

Senior posting
- Based in: Agra, Uttar Pradesh, India
- Period in office: 1898-1907
- Predecessor: Salig Ram
- Successor: Kamta Prasad Sinha

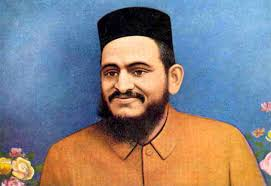
Maharaj sahab

Maharaj Sahab commonly known as Param Guru Maharaj Sahab, was the third revered Sant Satguru of the Radhasoami faith. He was the spiritual Guru and head of Radhasoami Satsang from 1898 to 1907.

== Early life ==
His parental name was Brahm Shankar Misra who succeeded Salig Ram in 1898. He was succeeded by Kamta Prasad Sinha in 1907.

== Literature ==
He was also the author of the book Discourses On Radhasoami faith, that provides a logical and scientific view to the teaching of Radhasoami faith.

== Radhasoami Satsang Dayalbagh ==
Located at: Dayalbagh, Agra. Lineage: Shiv Dayal Singh (Soami Ji Maharaj)- Salig Ram(Huzur Maharaj)— Brahm Shankar Misra(Maharaj Sahab) — Kamta Prasad Sinha(Sarkar Sahab) — Anand Swarup (Sahab Ji Maharaj, Founder of Dayalbagh) — Gurcharan Das Mehta — Makund Behari Lal(Lal Sahab) — Prem Saran Satsangi(Satsangi Sahab). Dayalbagh was founded by Anand Swarup, Kt. The present Guru Prem Saran Satsangi is a retired physicist and system scientist of IIT Delhi. The 200th birth anniversary of Shiv Dayal Singh was celebrated in Dayalbagh from August 2017 to 24 August 2018.

== Contribution ==
Maharaj Sahab is well known for the historical monument Soami Bagh in Agra. Soami Bagh in Agra was proposed by Maharaj Sahab. Under the leadership of Maharaj Sahab a grand marble structure was built, which can accommodate all the followers and visitors.

== Samadh ==
Maharaj Sahab samadh is located in Varanasi at Kabir Chaura considered as a holy place among his followers.
