= Makund Behari Lal =

Seventh Sant Satguru of Radhasoami Faith and Indian Zoologist

Param Guru Prof. M.B. Lal Sahab
- Portrait of Makund Behari Lal
- Title: Spiritual Teacher (Sant Satguru)

Personal life
- Born: 31 January 1907 Biswan, United Provinces of Agra and Oudh, British India
- Died: 5 December 2002 (aged 95) Agra, Uttar Pradesh, India
- Education: University of Lucknow
- Known for: Seventh Sant Satguru of Radhasoami Faith, August Founder of DEI (Deemed to be University), Vice-Chancellor of University of Lucknow, INSA Fellow
- Other names: Param Purush Puran Dhani Huzur Lal Sahab, Graceous Hazur Lal Sahab

Religious life
- Religion: Sant SatGuru Of Radha Soami Sect
- Sect: Sant Mat Radha Soami

Senior posting
- Based in: Agra, Uttar Pradesh, India
- Period in office: 1975-2002
- Predecessor: Gurcharan Das Mehta
- Successor: Prem Saran Satsangi

Makund Bihari Lal Sahab (31 January 1907 – 5 December 2002) popularly known as "Param Guru Huzur Dr. M.B. Lal Sahab" was the Seventh Revered Sant Satguru of the Radha Soami sect or Radhasoami Satsang Dayalbagh, Agra.

He was also a zoologist who served as a professor in the Department of Zoology and subsequently as the Vice-Chancellor of University of Lucknow from 1968 to 1971. He was also the Founder Director of DEI (Dayalbagh Educational Institute)and the master architect of its education policy, 1975. He functioned as Spiritual Head of Radhasoami Satsang Sabha from 1975 to 2002.

== Early life ==
Mukund Behari Lal Sahab studied at the Government High School, Sitapur and the Christian Intermediate College, Lucknow before obtaining a BSc and MSc in zoology from the University of Lucknow. He was awarded Doctor of Science from the University of Edinburgh for his research work and thesis "Trematode Parasites of Birds".

Lal Sahab ji got married on July 9, 1932, to Pbn. Surat Kumari ji, There were no children from the marriage. Pbn. Surat Kumari ji died at Lucknow on May 23, 1969. He was elected as a Fellow of the Indian Academy of Sciences in 1942, and a fellow of the Indian National Science Academy in 1962.

== As Seventh Sant Satguru of Radhasoami Faith ==
Graceous Huzur Lal Sahab, became Seventh Sant Satguru of Radhasoami Satsang in 1975.The flock was thereafter shepherded by him, the Teacher Perfect. He gave the university with its special system of education and the Unique Education Policy. He began the programme of establishing Satsang Colonies where, free from turmoil of the world, Satsangis can live a life in Satsang. He Himself lived the life of a hermit as an example to emulate. His Durbar was open to all, where one could carry one's prayers and place in His Holy Feet. He told us that the message of Huzur Radhasoami Dayal would spread through the example of Satsang Community, how they live and work and not through preaching.

== Radhasoami Satsang Dayalbagh ==
Located at: Dayalbagh, Agra. Lineage: Shiv Dayal Singh (Soami Ji Maharaj)- Salig Ram(Huzur Maharaj)— Brahm Shankar Misra(Maharaj Sahab) — Kamta Prasad Sinha(Sarkar Sahab) — Anand Swarup (Sahab Ji Maharaj, Founder of Dayalbagh) — Gurcharan Das Mehta(Mehta Ji Maharaj) — Makund Behari Lal(Lal Sahab) — Prem Saran Satsangi(Satsangi Sahab). Dayalbagh was founded by Anand Swarup, Kt. The present Guru Prem Saran Satsangi is an emeritus professor, physicist and system scientist of IIT Delhi. The 200th birth anniversary of Shiv Dayal Singh was celebrated in Dayalbagh from August 2017 to 24 August 2018.

== See also ==
- Radha Soami Satsang Dayalbagh lineage
  - Param Guru Soami Ji Maharaj (1818–1878)
  - Param Guru Huzur Maharaj (1829–1898)
  - Param Guru Maharaj Sahab (1861–1907)
  - Param Guru Sarkar Sahab (1871–1913)
  - Param Guru Sahab Ji Maharaj (1881–1937)
  - Param Guru Mehta Ji Maharaj (1885–1975)
  - Param Guru Lal Sahab (1907–2002)
  - Param Guru Satsangi Sahab (1937–present)
