= Salig Ram =

Second Sant Satguru of The Radhasoami Faith

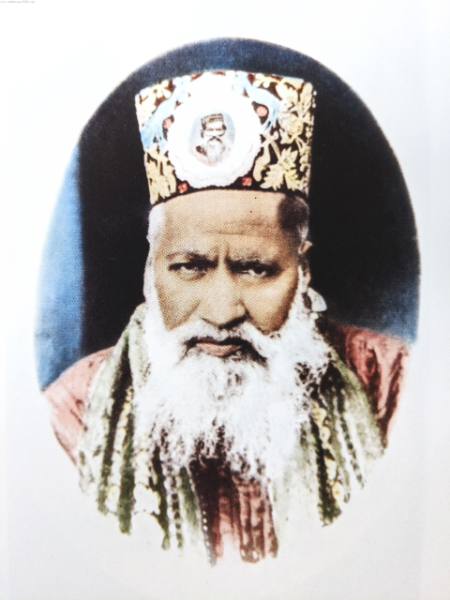

Personal life
- Born: 14 March 1829 Agra, Ceded Provinces, British India
- Died: 6 December 1898 (aged 69) Agra, North-Western Provinces, British India

Religious life
- Religion: Radha Soami, Sant Mat

Senior posting
- Based in: Peepal Mandi, Agra, North-Western Provinces, British India (present-day Agra, Uttar Pradesh, India)
- Period in office: 1878-1898
- Predecessor: Shiv Dayal Singh
- Successor: Maharaj Sahab (Brahm Shankar Misra), Ajodhya Prasad(Son),
- Influenced by: Shiv Dayal Singh, Tulsi Sahib
- Influenced: Maharaj Sahab (Brahm Shankar Misra), Ajodhya Prasad, Shivbratlal

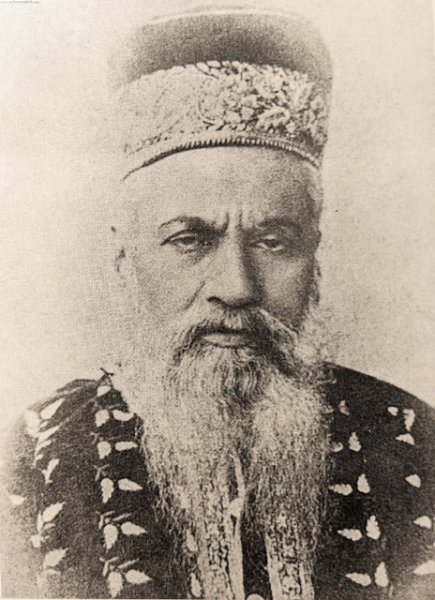

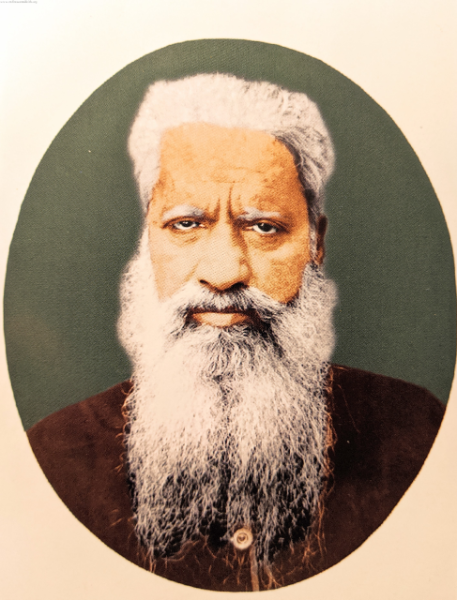

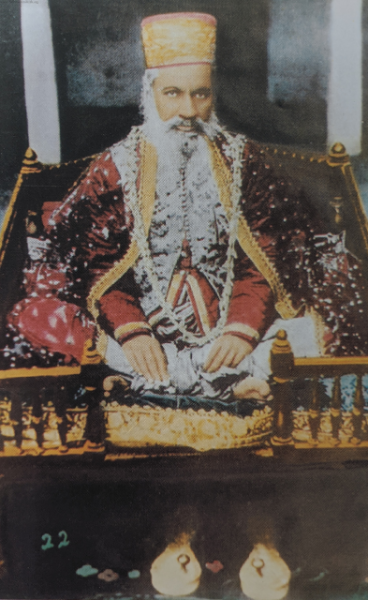

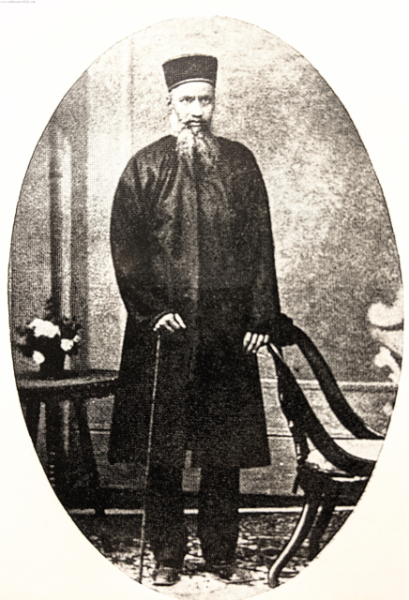

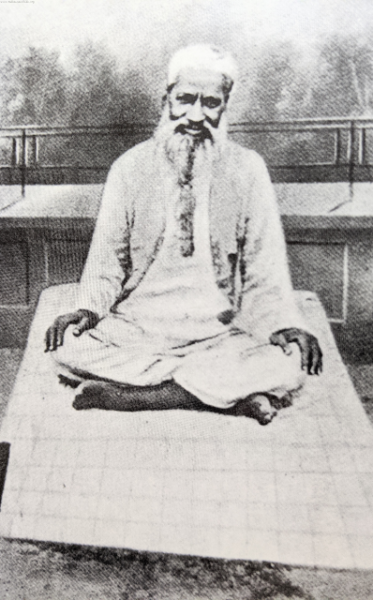

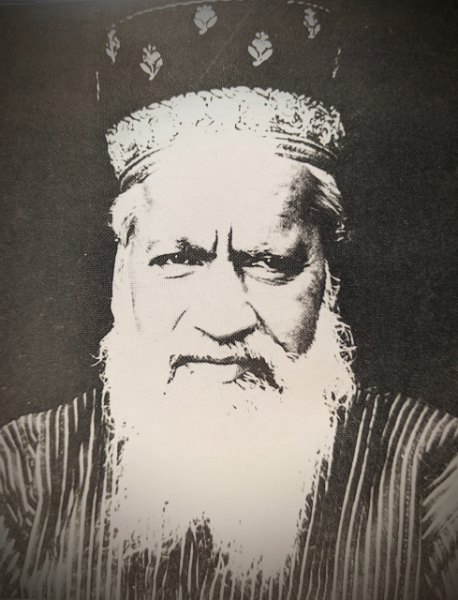

Salig Ram, successor of Shiv Dayal Singh second Sant Satguru of the Radhasoami Satsang popularly known by the honorific "Huzur Maharaj" and by the government-conferred title "Rai Bahadur," was born in Peepal Mandi, Agra, on 14 March 1829. He served as chief inspector of post offices in British India, and, in 1881, was Postmaster-General of the North-Western Provinces, based in Allahabad. He was the first Indian to hold the position.

Salig Ram came in contact with his guru, Shiv Dayal Singh, in 1858 in Agra. Salig Ram recognised his guru as the first physical incarnation of the Supreme Being, whom Salig Ram called by the name "Radha Soami." Salig Ram served Shiv Dayal Singh for many years and, after Shiv Dayal Singh's death, Salig Ram retired from his job, and the Radha Soami sect in Agra took up the role of guru. He died on 6 December 1898.

== Satsang Ashram ==
Several teaching lineages have descended from Salig Ram. Some of the more prominent are:

=== Radha Soami Satsang (Huzuri Bhavan) ===
Located at: Huzuri Bhavan (Huzur's Center), Peepal Mandi, Agra city (now in Uttar Pradesh). This is Salig Ram's home, where his direct descendants conduct Satsang today. The place is also known as Huzuri Samadh which is believed to be a holy place and Satsang takes place every day. The lineage of gurus runs: Salig Ram well known as Hazur Maharaj — Ajudhya Prasad well known as Lalaji Maharaj (son of Saligam)-- Ram Kunwar well known as a — Gurar Psara (elder son of Lalaji Maharaj—Dadaji Maharaj (Grandson of Kunwar Ji Maharaj).

=== Radha Soami Central Administrative Council ===
Located at: Soami Bagh, Agra. Lineage: Salig Ram — Brahm Shankar Misra — Maheshwari Devi ( Buaji Saheba) — Madhav Prasad Sinha.

=== Radhasoami Satsang Dayalbagh, Agra ===
Located at: Dayalbagh, Agra. Lineage: Shiv Dayal Singh - Salig Ram — Brahm Shankar Misra — Kamta Prasad Sinha — Anand Swarup (Founder of Dayalbagh) — Gurcharan Das Mehta — Makund Behari Lal — Prem Saran Satsangi. Dayalbagh was founded by Anand Swarup, Kt. The present Guru Prem Saran Satsangi is a retired physicist and system scientist of IIT Delhi. The 200th birth anniversary of Shiv Dayal Singh was celebrated in Dayalbagh from August 2017 to 24 August 2018.

=== Radha Soami ===
Located at: Gopi Ganj, Mirzapur, Uttar Pradesh. Lineage: Salig Ram — Shivbratlal Varman (founder).

=== Be Man Temple ===
Located at: Manavta Mandir, Hoshiarpur, Punjab. Lineage: Salig Ram — Shivbratlal Varman — Faqir Chand (founder) — Bhagat Munshi Ram and Ishwar Chandra Sharma.

=== Radha Soami Satsang, Dinod ===
Located at: Dinod, Bhiwani, Haryana. Lineage: Salig Rām — Shivbratlal Varman — Ram Singh Arman — Tarachand (founder) — Kanwar Singh.

== Holy Books ==
Salig Ram published "abstracts" of the talks of Shiv Dayal Singh, as well as his own writings. He wrote following books:

- Prem Patra Radha Soami (six volumes)
- Prem Bani Radha Soami
- Radha Soami Mat Prakash (English)
- Radha Soami Mat Sandesh
- Radha Soami Mat Upadesh
- Sar-Upadesh
- Nij-Upadesh
- Guru-Upadesh
- Jugat Prakash

== See also ==
- Radha Soami
- Saligrama (disambiguation)
