= Prem Saran Satsangi =

Spiritual Guru & Indian systems scientist (born 1937)

Satsangi Sahab
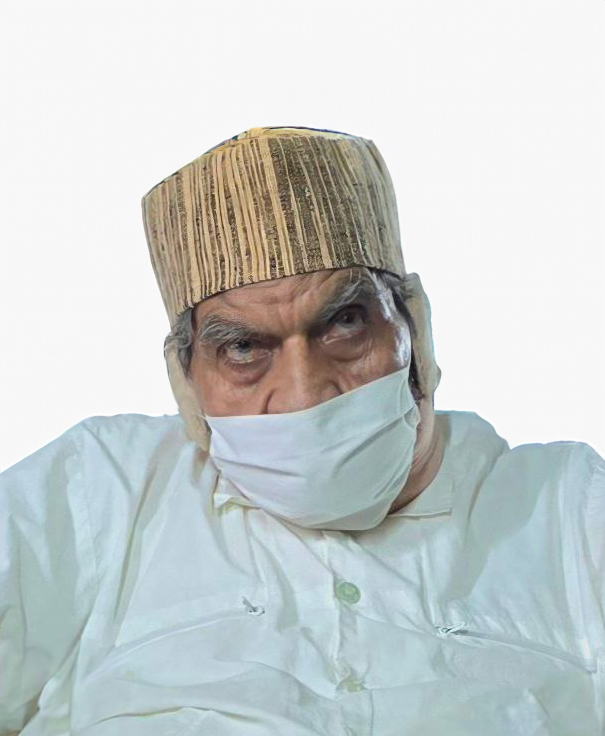
- Title: Spiritual Teacher (Vaqt Sant Satguru)

Personal life
- Other names: Gracious Huzur, Param Guru Huzur Satsangi Sahab

Religious life
- Religion: Sant SatGuru of Radha Soami Sect
- Sect: Sant Mat Radhasoami

Senior posting
- Based in: Agra, Uttar Pradesh, India
- Period in office: 2003 – present
- Predecessor: Makund Behari Lal

PROFESSOR Prem Saran Satsangi
- Prem Saran Satsangi
- Born: 9 March 1937 (age 89); Benares, Benares State, British India
- Education: Indian Institute of Technology (BHU) Varanasi; Michigan State University; University of Waterloo; Tata Institute of Fundamental Research
- Known for: Sant Satguru of Radhasoami Faith; Founder of System Society of India; Father of the system movement in India; Systems modelling; Applied systems research; Eastern philosophy in the spiritual traditions
- Awards: National Systems Award 1977; Jacob Gold Medal (1987); Life Time Achievement Award from IIT Roorkee 2008; Distinguished Service Award from IIT Delhi 2011; Mahamana Science and Technology Ati Vishisht Ratna 2024
- Scientific career
- Fields: Consciousness, Quantum Theory, Systems engineering
- Institutions: Indian Institute of Technology Delhi; IIT (BHU) Varanasi; MBM Engineering College; Dayalbagh Educational Institute
- Thesis: A physical systems theory modelling frame work generalized for large scale economic system. (1968)
- Doctoral advisor: Jack B. Ellis

Prem Saran Satsangi (born 9 March 1937) honorifically known as "Gracious Huzur" is the current sant satguru of Radha Soami Sect, Dayalbagh or Radhasoami Satsang Dayalbagh who succeeded Param Guru Lal Sahab, seventh Sant Satguru in 2003.

He is also the founder and first president of the System Society of India, a professional body of system scientists. He holds the emeritus chair from the East of the Integrated East-West Forum at The Science of Consciousness Conferences since 2012. He is the chairman of Advisory Committee on Education (ACE), Dayalbagh Educational Institute (deemed to be university).

== Birth ==
He was born on the campus of Banaras Hindu University, Varanasi on the day of Indian festival of Holi on 9 March 1937, to Krishna Kumar, a professor of botany at Agriculture College, Banaras Hindu University and Bhakt Saheli.

== Education and early career ==
He studied electrical engineering at the Banaras Hindu University, now Indian Institute of Technology (BHU) Varanasi, and graduated in 1957.

He was initiated into Radhasoami faith on 13 February 1958. In 1960 he accepted a scholarship at Michigan State University, where he received his M.S. in electrical engineering in 1961. The USAID extended his fellowship for PhD, but Satsangi declined the offer and returned to India in July 1961. He got an appointment as reader in electrical engineering at MBM Engineering College and was appointed to the faculty in 1964.

He, thereafter joined the Indian Institute of Technology Delhi in 1964. In the initial years, he taught basic network theory (analysis and synthesis), control theory and electric traction courses. He served as assistant professor for 8 years, associate professor in 1972 and professor of electrical engineering in 1973.

He was selected for a Canadian Commonwealth Research Fellowship award. He secured admission as a doctoral candidate at the University of Waterloo with research supervisor Jack B. Ellis in the research field of socio-economic systems.

In the summer of 1970, he went to the University of Waterloo as a post doctoral fellow for three months for joint research assignment with the Department of Systems design engineering and Man-environment studies. During the period, he completed his PhD dissertation in the form of relevant papers. He also attended a short summer course at MIT on transport systems.

== Dayalbagh (1993–2002) ==
He left IIT Delhi in May 1993 to join the Dayalbagh Educational Institute as its director. He became the member of Radhasoami Satsang Sabha in 1993. During the 1990s, he was involved in education and research in intelligent systems engineering applications to large and complex systems by invoking soft computing techniques and published several papers and produced a number of doctoral theses.

He held the office of Director of Dayalbagh Educational Institute for almost nine years. His primary duties involved academic administration, although he continued participating in systems science research and practice.

He is involved in the research of systemic education and experiences related to material, energy, information, mind, intellect, emotion and the science of spiritual consciousness transcending the one in ancient India and the recent advances in neurophysiology and cognitive psychology.

== As Vaqt Sant Satguru (2003-Present) ==
On 18 May 2003, a gathering in Dayalbagh of about 25000 representatives of about half a million Followers of Radhasoami Satsang Dayalbagh, from all over India and abroad Acclaimed Prem Saran Satsangi Sahab as the Eighth Vaqt Sant Satguru (Eighth Spiritual Leader) of the Faith. As a Sant Satguru, he preaches the teachings of Sant Mat and initiates thousands of his eligible followers into Surat Shabd Yoga. Under his guidance, Radhasoami Satsang Sabha, initiated the Murar Declaration on 13 June 2010, for forging unity among different Radhasoami communities.

He believes that the theory of spiritual systems is fully consistent with the latest theory of everything of the Physical Universe.

== Radhasoami Satsang Dayalbagh ==
Located at: Dayalbagh, Agra. Lineage: Shiv Dayal Singh (Soami Ji Maharaj)- Salig Ram(Huzur Maharaj)— Brahm Shankar Misra(Maharaj Sahab) — Kamta Prasad Sinha(Sarkar Sahab) — Anand Swarup (Sahab Ji Maharaj, Founder of Dayalbagh) — Gurcharan Das Mehta(Mehta Ji Maharaj) — Makund Behari Lal(Lal Sahab) — Prem Saran Satsangi(Satsangi Sahab). Dayalbagh was founded by Anand Swarup, Kt. The present Guru Prem Saran Satsangi is an emeritus professor, physicist and system scientist of IIT Delhi. The 200th birth anniversary of Shiv Dayal Singh was celebrated in Dayalbagh from August 2017 to 24 August 2018.

== Family ==
Satsangi sahab got married on 11 November 1958 (Deepavali) to P.Bn. Satyavati and they have 2 daughters, Prem Pyari and Dayal Pyari, who are both married.

== Research papers ==
Satsangi Sahab has published 90 research papers and has attended several national and international conferences. His major contributions are in the field of Applied systems engineering including socio-economic systems such as transportation and energy systems.

== See also ==
- Academics
  - T. Karunakaran – Ph.D. student supervised by P.S. Satsangi at IIT Delhi
  - List of University of Waterloo people
- Religion
  - Radha Soami Satsang Dayalbagh lineage
    - Param Guru Soami Ji Maharaj (1818–1878)
    - Param Guru Huzur Maharaj (1829–1898)
    - Param Guru Maharaj Sahab (1861–1907)
    - Param Guru Sarkar Sahab (1871–1913)
    - Param Guru Sahab Ji Maharaj (1881–1937)
    - Param Guru Mehta Ji Maharaj (1885–1975)
    - Param Guru Lal Sahab (1907–2002)
    - Prem Saran Satsangi (born 1937)
