= T. Karunakaran =

Indian engineer and reformer (1946–2019)

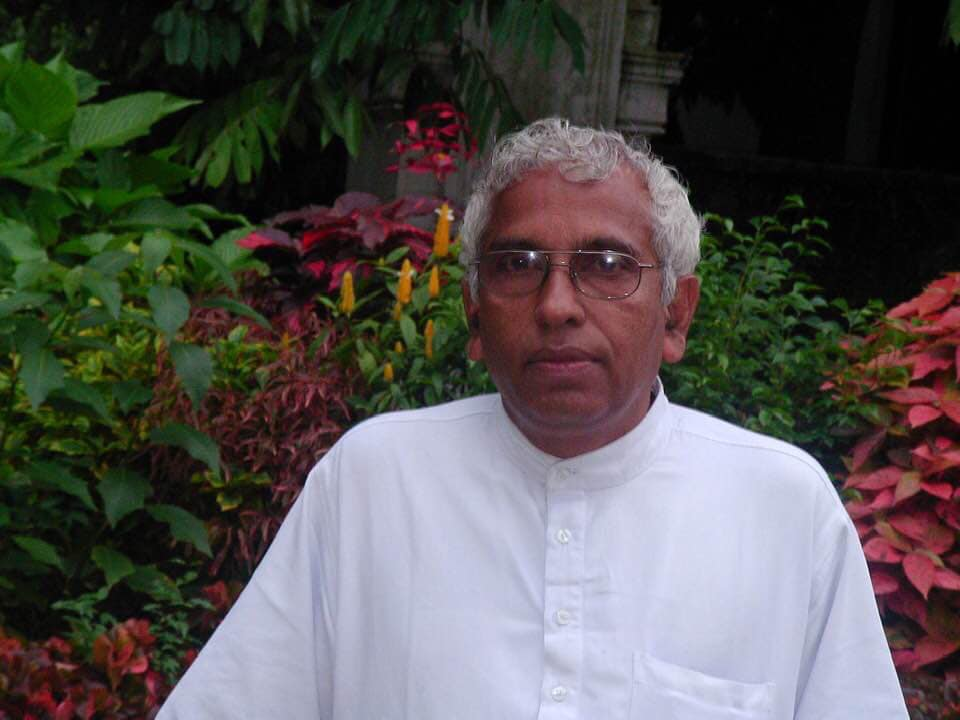
- Born: 26 December 1946; Kanyakumari District, India
- Died: 12 March 2019 (aged 72); Mumbai, India
- Known for: Rural Economic Zone
- Children: 3

Academic background
- Education: Thiagarajar College of Engineering, Indian Institute of Technology Delhi
- Doctoral advisor: Prem Saran Satsangi

Academic work
- Discipline: Electrical Engineering, Rural Economic Development

Thirumalayaperumal Karunakaran (26 December 1946 – 12 March 2019) was an Indian engineer, academic, social organizer and reformer who worked on rural development problems in India and other countries. He proposed a model of decentralized development called the Rural Economic Zone as an alternative to the Special Economic Zone model of development. He served as Vice-Chancellor of two Gandhian Rural Universities, and served as the director of the Mahatma Gandhi Institute for Rural Industrialization (MGIRI) and founded the Agrindus Institute in Wardha.

== Early life and education ==
Karunakaran was born in Poovenkudiyiruppu village of Kanyakumari District of pre-Independence India. He received a Bachelor of Engineering in Electrical Engineering from Thiagarajar College of Engineering in 1969. He studied Mathematical System Theory from the Department of Electrical Engineering at the Indian Institute of Technology Delhi where he obtained a PhD in 1975 under Prem Saran Satsangi.

== Career and work ==
Karunakaran served for 19 years in four IITs in different research and academic positions.

From 1987 until 1997, Karunakaran was the Director of the Rural Technology Centre at Gandhigram Rural Institute (GRI), Tamil Nadu. He was the Vice Chancellor of Mahatma Gandhi Chitrakoot Gramoday Vishwavidyalaya in Madhya Pradesh from 1997 to 2004, and returned to GRI in 2004 to serve as Vice Chancellor.

He then became the Director of MGIRI in Wardha from 2008 until 2011. Under his leadership, MGIRI launched solar-powered charkhas to increase the volume and quality of yarn that a farming household could produce. This project was adopted and scaled up by the government of India to provide employment to 100,000 individuals in 50 sectors.

Karunakaran was then founder-director of the Agrindus Institute until his death in 2019. Agrindus trained children, primarily of farmers who had committed suicide, to become entrepreneurs and bring industrial value-added activities to the farm. Karunaran's work at Agrindus built on Gandhian ideas of socio-economic development, including the work-based education principle known as Nai Talim, and Gandhi's vision of self-reliant village-centered economies. Karunakaran developed the latter economic approach into the Rural Economic Zone concept, an alternate model of development to the Special Economic Zone.
