= Sant Mat =

Hindu spiritual movement in the 13th century

Sant Mat, also known as the Sant movement, was a spiritual movement on the Indian subcontinent during the 13th–17th centuries CE. The name literally means "teachings of sants", i.e. mystic Hindu saints. Through association and seeking truth by following sants and their teachings, a movement was formed. Theologically, the teachings are distinguished by inward, loving devotion by the individual soul (atma) to the Divine Principal God (Parmatma). Socially, its egalitarianism distinguishes it from the caste system, and from Hindus and Muslims. Sant Mat is not to be confused with the 19th-century Radha Soami, also known as contemporary "Sant Mat movement".

The lineage of sants can be divided into two main groups: a northern group from the provinces of Punjab, Rajasthan and Uttar Pradesh, who expressed themselves mainly in vernacular Hindi; and a southern group, whose language is Marathi, represented by Namdev and other sants of Maharashtra.

== The Sants ==
The Sant Mat movement was heterogeneous, and consisted mostly of the sants own socio-religious attitudes, which were based on bhakti (devotion) as described in the Bhagavad Gita. Sharing as few conventions with each other as with the followers of the traditions they challenged, the sants appear more as a diverse collection of spiritual personalities than a specific religious tradition, although they acknowledged a common spiritual root.

The poet-sants expressed their teaching in vernacular verse, addressing themselves to the common folk in oral style in Hindi and other dialects and other languages such as Marathi, Gujarati and Punjabi. They referred to the "Divine Name" as having saving power, and dismissed the religious rituals as having no value. They presented the idea that true religion was a matter of surrendering to God "who dwells in the heart".

The first generation of north Indian sants, (which included Kabir and Ravidas), appeared in the region of Benares in the mid–15th century. Preceding them were two notable 13th and 14th century figures, Namdev and Ramananda. The latter, according to Sant Mat tradition, was a Vaishnava ascetic who initiated Kabir, Ravidas, and other sants. Ramanand's story is told differently by his lineage of "Ramanandi" monks, by other sants preceding him, and later by the Sikhs. Sant Mat practitioners accept that Ramananda's students formed the first generation of sants.

Sants developed a culture of concern for marginalized in the society. Some of the more notable sants include Namdev (d. 1350), Kabir (d. 1518), Nanak (d. 1539), Mira Bai (d. 1545), Surdas (d. 1573), Dadu Dayal (d. 1603), Tulsidas (d. 1623), and Tukaram (d. 1650).

The tradition of the sants (sant parampara) remained non-sectarian, although a number of sant poets have been considered as the founders of sects. Some of these may bear the sant's name, but were developed after them by later followers such as Kabir Panth, Dadu Panth, Dariya Panth, Advait Mat, Science of Spirituality and Radhasoami.

Only a small minority of religious Hindus have formally followed Sant Mat, but the tradition has considerably influenced Hindus across sects and castes. Bhajans (devotional songs) attributed to past sants such as Mira Bai are widely listened to in India and in Hindu communities around the world. The sant tradition is the only one in medieval and modern India that has successfully crossed some barriers between Hindu and Muslim faiths. Julius J. Lipner asserts that the lives of many Hindus have been leavened by the religious teachings of the sants, which he describes as liberating.

The Sant Mat tradition teaches the necessity of a living human master, who is referred to with honorific titles such as satguru, or perfect master.

== Phases ==
As per Jarosław Zapart, the Sant Mat movements of the nirguṇī panth variety, such as the Kabirpanthis and Dadupanthis, underwent two primary phases:

- A first phase of image-building, where emphasis is placed on the individual autonomy and authority of the Sant as a religious and social defier
- A second phase of Sanskritization, consisting of the community (panth) interacting with broader cultural, religious, and political milieus

== Similar movements ==
Classical Gnostics, medieval Sufi poets such as Shams Tabrizi, Jalal al-Din Muhammad Rumi or Hafez, and Sindhi poets, are considered to have many similarities with the poet-sants of Sant Mat.

The Radha Soami movement in North India, also known as "Sant Mat movement", is regarded as a repository of the tradition of the Sants and their teachings, and their approach to religious endeavours, and presents itself as a living incarnation of the Sant tradition. The most notable being Radhasoami Satsang Beas, situated on the banks of the river Beas, whose current Living Master is Baba Gurinder Singh and Radhasoami Satsang Dayalbagh (Agra), situated on the banks of the river Yamuna, whose current Living Master is Param Guru Prof. Prem Saran Satsangi Sahab. Other offshoot of Dayalbagh and Beas include Baba Jai Gurudev Satsang, Dinod, Anukul Chandra Satsang, Sachha Sauda, Sawan Kirpal Ruhani Mission etc. According to Mark Juergensmeyer, that claim is also made by the Kabir-panthis, the Satpanthis, the Sikhs and other movements that continue to find the insights from the Sant tradition valid today.

Prem Rawat and the Divine Light Mission (Elan Vital) are considered to be part of the Sant Mat tradition by J. Gordon Melton, Lucy DuPertuis, and Vishal Mangalwadi, but that characterization is disputed by Ron Geaves. The 20th century religious movement Eckankar is also considered by David C. Lane to be an offshoot of the Sant Mat tradition. James R. Lewis refers to these movements as "expressions of an older faith in a new context".

== See also ==
- Shiv Dayal Singh
- Maharshi Mehi Paramhans
- Salig Ram
- Sawan Singh
- Maharishi Shiv Brat Lal
- Anand Swarup
- Surat Shabd Yoga
