= Radha Soami Satsang Sabha =

Indian religious and charitable organisation

- Official logo of the Radha Soami Satsang Sabha (Dayalbagh)

Religions
- Radha Soami Sant Mat (Non-denominational)

Website
- https://www.dayalbagh.org.in/

Radhasoami Satsang Sabha also written as Ra Dha Sva Aa Mi Satsang Sabha is the Chief Working Committee of Radhasoami Satsang Dayalbagh. Sabha was founded in 1910 and came to be registered under the Charitable Societies Registration Act (No. 21 of 1860). The teachings of Radha Soami sect are based on the spiritual teachings of Shiv Dayal Singh. The Present spiritual head is Param Guru Prof. Prem Saran Satsangi Sahab who is also the eighth and current sant satguru of Radhasoami Satsang Dayalbagh and a system scientist and physicist. The President in head of Radhasoami Satsang Sabha is Mr. Sood (Retd. IAS), and Secretary is Mr. Premdas Satsangi

== Lineage of Radhasoami Satsang Dayalbagh ==
- Shiv Dayal Singh (1818–1878) alias Param Guru Soami Ji Maharaj, First guru of Radhasoami Satsang and spiritual head, 1861–1878
- Salig Ram (1829–1898) alias Param Guru Huzur Maharaj, Second guru of Radhasoami Satsang and spiritual head 1878–1898
- Maharaj Sahab (1861–1907) alias Param Guru Maharaj Sahab, Third guru of Radhasoami Satsang and spiritual head, 1898–1907
- Kamta Prasad Sinha (1871–1913) alias Param Guru Sarkar Sahab, Fourth guru of Radhasoami Satsang and spiritual head of Satsang Sabha, 1907–1913
- Anand Swarup (1881–1937) alias Param Guru Sahab Ji Maharaj, Fifth guru of Radhasoami Satsang and spiritual head of Satsang Sabha, 1913–1937
- Gurcharan Das Mehta (1885–1975) alias Param Guru Mehta Ji Maharaj, Sixth guru of Radhasoami Satsang and spiritual head of Satsang Sabha, 1937–1975
- Makund Behari Lal (1907–2002) alias Param Guru Lal Sahab, Seventh guru of Radhasoami Satsang and spiritual head of Satsang Sabha, 1975–2002
- Prem Saran Satsangi (1937–Present) alias Param Guru Satsangi Sahab, Eighth and Present guru of Radhasoami Satsang and spiritual head, 2002–Present

== Key organisations and Charitable institutions ==
- Radhasoami Satsang Dayalbagh
- Saran Ashram Hospital (charitable hospital)
- Dayalbagh Educational Institute
- Dayalbagh Science of Consciousness
- International Center for Agroecology(ICA)
- SPHEEHA
- Systems Society of India
- International Centre for Applied Systems Science for Sustainable Development
- The (Dayalbagh) Ra Dha Sva Aa Mi Satsang Association of Europe
- Dayalbagh Radhasoami Satsang Association of Australia
- Dayalbagh Radhasoami Satsang Association Of North America

== See also ==
- Dayalbagh
- Radhasoami Satsang Dayalbagh
- Radha Soami Satsang Beas
- Sant Mat
