= Living Master =

Living Master is a term which distinguishes a living spiritual teacher from one who has already left his physical form (i.e., died). Certain esoteric spiritual movements, notably Sant Mat and Surat Shabd Yoga, consider a living spiritual adept to be essential, and critique the world religions as mere shells where a living master (who founded the religious movement) has been replaced with a scripture, statue, effigy, or other symbol. Just as an example of the current usage, Sant Baljit Singh is described by his disciples as a Living Master, while Jesus Christ or the Buddha are examples of past Masters or Masters out of date as per Sant Mat.

TODAY a person who is ill cannot have the benefit of medical advice from Dhanwantri (the progenitor of medical science), nor can a litigant ask Solomon to decide his case, nor can a lady marry Adonis and bring forth children. Similarly, Saints who appeared in the past from time to time and conferred spiritual benefit on those who came into contact with them, cannot do anything for the present generation. Each had his commission, and on completing it, entrusted the work of regeneration to his successor. Man can learn only from man, and God works His ways through living Saints. (Kirpal Singh)
