= Gurcharan Das Mehta =

Sixth Sant Satguru of Radhasoami Faith

Param Guru Mehta Ji Mahraj
- Title: Spiritual Teacher (Sant Satguru)

Personal life
- Born: 20 December 1885 Batala, Punjab
- Died: 17 February 1975 (aged 89) Dayalbagh, Agra
- Other name: Param Purush Puran Dhani Mehta Ji Mahraj

Religious life
- Religion: Sant SatGuru Of Radha Soami Sect
- Sect: Sant Mat Radhasoami

Senior posting
- Based in: Agra, Uttar Pradesh, India
- Period in office: 1937-1975
- Predecessor: Anand Swarup
- Successor: Makund Bihari Lal

Gurcharan Das Mehta (20 December 1885 – 17 February 1975), commonly known as Param Guru Mehta Ji Maharaj, was the Sixth Revered Sant Satguru of the Radhasoami Faith or Radha Soami Satsang Dayalbagh. He was the spiritual head of Radhasoami Satsang Sabha from 1938 to 1975.

== Early life ==
He was born on 20 December 1885 at Batala in Punjab, to a respectable Punjabi family. His Father, Shri Atma Ram Sahab Mehta was the Town Magistrate and had been initiated in Radhasoami Faith by Param Guru Huzur Maharaj. Mehtaji Maharaj was extraordinarily intelligent from childhood.. He studied from Thomason College of Civil Engineering, Roorkee (now IIT Roorkee) and served in Punjab Government.

== As Sixth Sant Sant Satguru ==
Mehta Ji became Sant Satguru of Radha Soami Satsang Dayalbagh on 24 June 1937. He stressed on agricultural work and Seva. He also strengthened the industries and educational institutions of Dayalbagh and was known as the Architect of Dayalbagh.

Huzur Mehta Ji Maharaj galvanized the Satsang Community into a well-organized body. He strengthened the foundation of the Satsang institutions and made the resources available for their development.

== Radhasoami Satsang Dayalbagh ==
Located at: Dayalbagh, Agra. Guru Lineage of Param Guru Huzur Mehta Ji Maharaj continue till date: Shiv Dayal Singh (Soami Ji Maharaj)- Salig Ram(Huzur Maharaj)— Brahm Shankar Misra(Maharaj Sahab) — Kamta Prasad Sinha(Sarkar Sahab) — Anand Swarup (Sahab Ji Maharaj, Founder of Dayalbagh) — Gurcharan Das Mehta(Mehta Ji Maharaj) — Makund Behari Lal(Lal Sahab) — Prem Saran Satsangi(Satsangi Sahab). Dayalbagh was founded by Anand Swarup, Kt. The present Guru Prem Saran Satsangi is an emeritus professor, physicist and system scientist of IIT Delhi. The 200th birth anniversary of Shiv Dayal Singh was celebrated in Dayalbagh from August 2017 to 24 August 2018.

== See also ==
- Radha Soami Satsang Dayalbagh lineage
  - Param Guru Soami Ji Maharaj (1818–1878)
  - Param Guru Huzur Maharaj (1829–1898)
  - Param Guru Maharaj Sahab (1861–1907)
  - Param Guru Sarkar Sahab (1871–1913)
  - Param Guru Sahab Ji Maharaj (1881–1937)
  - Param Guru Mehta Ji Maharaj (1885–1975)
  - Param Guru Lal Sahab (1907–2002)
  - Param Guru Satsangi Sahab (1937–present)
