= Sant (religion) =

Truth-exemplar in Indian religions

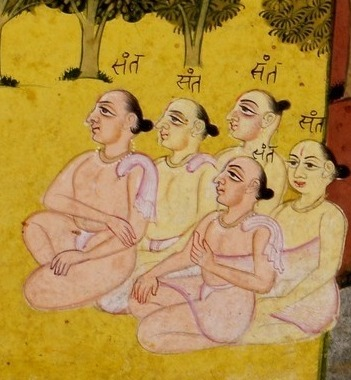
Group of five sants, Bhaktamal illustration, Bundelkhand, circa late 18th century

A sant (Sanskrit: सन्त्; IAST: Sant; [sɐn̪t̪]) is a person revered for their abnormal level of "self, truth, [and] reality" in Indian religions, particularly Hinduism, Jainism, Sikhism, and Buddhism. In Sikhism it is used to describe a being who has attained spiritual enlightenment and divine knowledge and power through union with God.

== Etymology ==
The word sant is ultimately derived from Sanskrit, Prakrit and Pali, where it serves as the present active participle of the verb "to be" (in Sanskrit: अस्ति; in Pali: atthi).

"Sant" is sometimes translated as "saint", but this is a false cognate (there is no etymological commonality) as "sant" is derived from the Sanskrit root sat, which can mean "truth, reality, essence", while "saint" is derived from the Latin word sanctus, which means "holy, sacred", derived from Indo-European root sak-, "to sanctify". Nevertheless, sant continues to be phono-semantically matched as saint in the present day.

Schomer and McLeod explain sant as preceptor of Sat or "truth, reality", in the sense of "'one who knows the truth' or 'one who has experienced Ultimate Reality', that is a person who has achieved a state of spiritual enlightenment or mystical self-realisation". William Pinch suggests the best translation of sant is "truth-exemplar".

== Usage ==
Sant differs from saint not merely in the etymological sense but also in usage. The word is used in various contexts:

- In fifteenth- and sixteenth-century India under Islamic rule, it was used generally to describe teachers and poet-scholars who led worshippers and communities the praises of god or goddess within the Bhakti movement in Hinduism.
- In modern era, the term sometimes describes any holy man or woman who advocates a particular form of spirituality or members of the group that leads a Sant Mat (teachings of a spiritual congregation).
- The term is also used in a generic sense and in this respect is similar to the usage of saint to indicate a morally good person. As such, it has been applied to a wide range of gurus (not to be confused with Sikh gurus) and other religious leaders.

== Sikhism ==
- In Sikhism, a sant, brahmgiani, or bhagat is any human being that has attained God realization and spiritual communion with God. Sikhs believe that the divine energy of God can be experienced by humans on Earth. This is attained through continual recitation and spiritual internalization of God's name (Naam Japo/Naam Simran). Sikhs commonly utilize reality as the name of God which cannot be simply uttered by the mouth but must be lived through truthfullness.
- Sants can originate from any religion. Figures such as Kabir, Ravidas, Namdev, Farid, Bhikkan and others are known as sants or bhagats, despite some being of Islam or Hindu faith. Divine knowledge is universal, and their knowledge after obtaining enlightenment through Naam Simran has been compiled and included in the holy book of Sikhism, the Sri Guru Granth Sahib.
- Sants are holy persons of very exalted status, one of being the ideal human being. As such, Sikhs are encouraged to seek the company and holy congregation of sants (Sadh-Sangat), learn from them, and attain "santhood" through intensive reading and contemplation of Sikh scripture (gurbani) and Naam Simran.
- The virtuous life associated with a sant or a brahmgyani (one who has a perfect knowledge of God) is strenuously defined in Sikh gurbani, most notably in the Sukhmani Sahib passage of the Sri Guru Granth Sahib. Sikhism advocates for people of all faiths to realize and become one with God, and attaining union with God is the highest form of spiritual enlightenment.

== Hinduism ==
In Hinduism, a Sant has an important place in the life of a devotee. Hindu scriptures also tell the importance of a sant. According to the Hindu scriptures, worshipers are freed from the disease of birth and death by taking refuge in a true sant and doing devotion according to the scriptures. The identity of the true sant is also stated in the holy scriptures of Hinduism that one who is a true sant will have complete knowledge of all the holy books and will initiate three types of mantras (names) thrice.

== See also ==
- Hindu reform movements
- Hindu sants
- List of Hindu gurus and sants
- Satguru (Sadguru)
- Satya
