= Satsang =

Audience with a guru for the purpose of spiritual or yogic instruction

Satsang (Sanskrit: सत्सङ्ग, romanized: Satsaṅga, lit. 'the company of truth') is an audience with a satguru for the purpose of spiritual or yogic instruction. The satsanga is a gathering of good people for the performance of devotional activities.

== Meanings ==
The word is derived from the Sanskrit sat meaning "purity or truth", and sanga meaning "in group or association". Thus the literal meaning of satsang is "the company of Truth", but it holds multiple meanings within the Sant and Bhakti traditions of northern India. Charlotte Vaudeville defines Sant as a distinct tradition because of its emphasis on devotion to the Divine Name (satnam), the Divine Guru (satguru), and the importance of the company of devotees (satsang). "Sat" (truth) in Indian traditions refers to that which is eternal and changeless. Along with "Cit" (consciousness) and Ānanda (bliss), it is a quality of Brahman (supreme being). In this context, Satsang represents an experience of Brahman, particularly as the personal Lord residing within the human heart.

In bhakti traditions, satsang takes on a communal aspect, signifying gatherings of devotees for inspiration and focus amidst worldly distractions. It includes listening to spiritual discourses and singing praises of the divine.

The main purpose of conducting satsanga by any organisation is for marking an important event in its history. Participating in any satsanga is considered pious in yogic sciences due to its benefits in spiritual upliftment of an aspirant. Satsangs are generally conducted by any non-religious or spiritual organisations in large groups.

== Activities ==
The following activities may take place in a satsanga:

- Spiritual discourse
- Bhajans
- Chanting of mantras
- Meditation
- Tree planting
- Cleanliness programmes
- Spiritual stories
- Weddings

== See also ==
- Guru
- Rishi
- Pandit
