= Dayalbagh =

Human settlement

Coordinates: 27°13′27″N 78°00′48″E

Dayalbagh or Dayal Bagh means 'Garden' (bagh) of 'Merciful' (dayal), inferring "Garden of the Merciful", is a locality in metropolitan Agra in western Uttar Pradesh, India was founded by fifth revered sant satguru of the Radhasoami faith, Param Guru Sahab Ji Maharaj on Basant Panchami Day in 1915. It is the headquarters of the Dayalbagh subsect of the Radha Soami sect or Radhasoami Satsang Dayalbagh where the 8th revered leader lives and presides over the satsang.

Dayalbagh is also known as the "Lungs of Agra" because of its green belt and eco-friendly community. It is a self-sustained colony, where its inhabitants lead an active, disciplined and co-operative community life, conforming to the spiritual ideals of their faith. It has affiliated educational institutes such as the Dayalbagh Educational Institute affiliated to Dayalbagh University (deemed). Radhasoami Satsang Sabha is the chief working committee of Radhasoami Faith Dayalbagh.

== Demographics ==
As of the 2001 India census, Dayalbagh had a population of 3324. Males constitute 51% of the population and females 49%. In Dayalbagh, 8% of the population is under six years of age.

== History ==
The colony of Dayalbagh was founded on the Basant Day (translation: first day of spring) on 20 January 1915 by Sir Anand Swarup (Huzur Sahab Ji Maharaj), the Fifth Revered Leader of Radha Soami sect, as an ashram or a spiritual home for the followers of the faith, by planting a mulberry tree. The colony was built by the voluntary contribution (by money as well as labor) of the early residents, who considered it as Sewa (social service). The fields near Yamuna river were also acquired by Dayalbagh and as a daily practice, residents and devotees coming from outside leveled the uneven landmass and irrigated it, making it a fertile land from the barren desert. Today also, the devotees give their voluntary contribution everyday in agricultural activities in the fields.

== Community life ==
The colony is laid out in an open garden setting. The land where the colony was established once consisted of sand dunes. For more than 60 years residents of the colony - men and women, young and old - have worked in a vast programme for reclamation of land launched in 1943 by Huzur Mehtaji Maharaj, the sixth Revered Leader of the Faith. The result is a 1,200-acre (4.9 km^{2}) farm where food-grains, oil-seeds, fodder, and vegetables are grown.

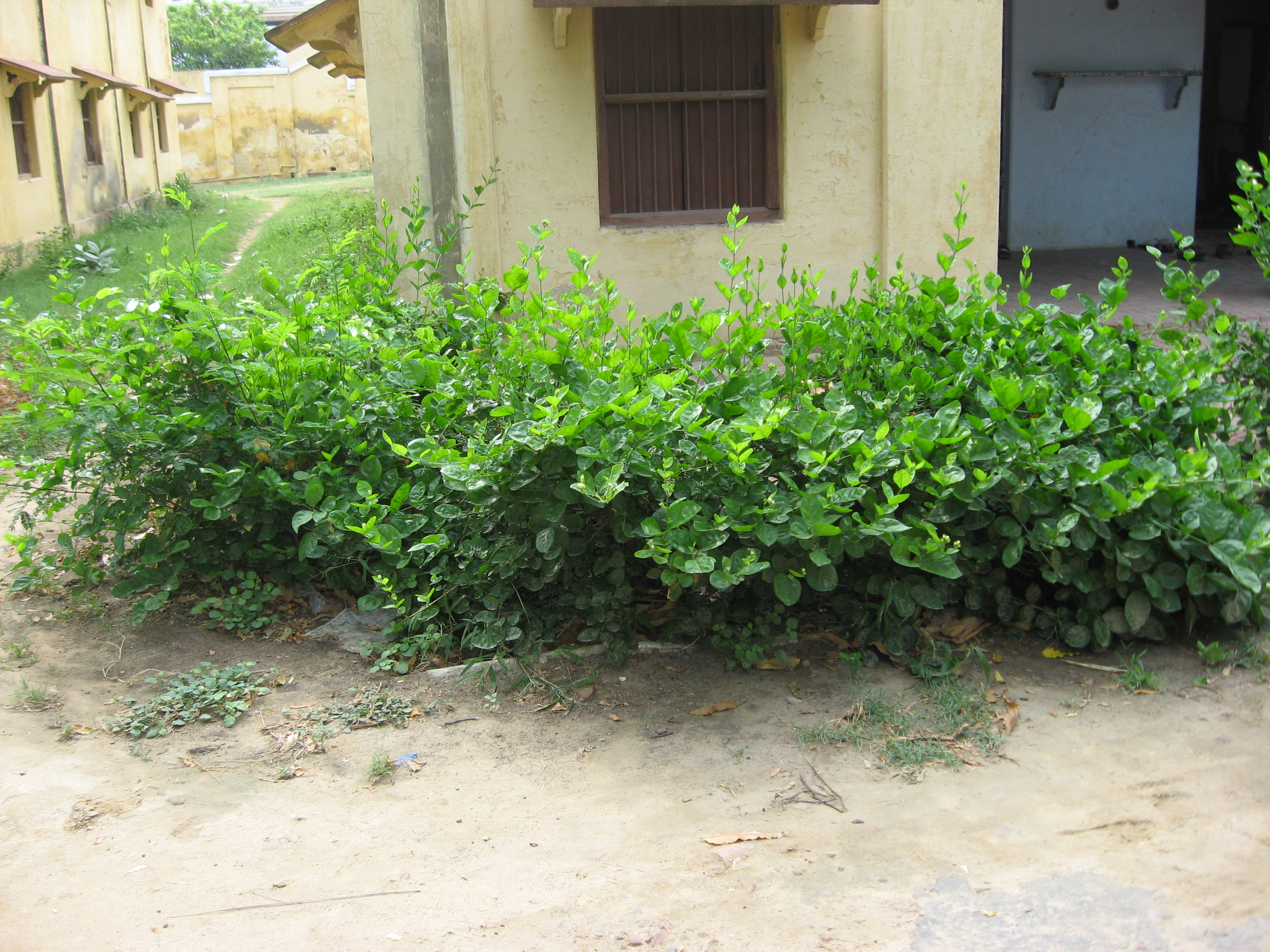
Shrubs are planted around houses, as part of the environmental protection movement

No individual owns property in Dayalbagh, as the land, houses and institutions belong to the community. People live and work as a community. For example, the residents share various responsibilities like cleaning up the colony and arranging night security. The colony has its own water supply, electricity distribution, and civic services. The colony's dairy provides most of the milk that is needed, and a community kitchen that supplies food at a very nominal cost (no-profit, no-loss basis) to pilgrims. The residents can also obtain meals from there and free themselves from household chores.

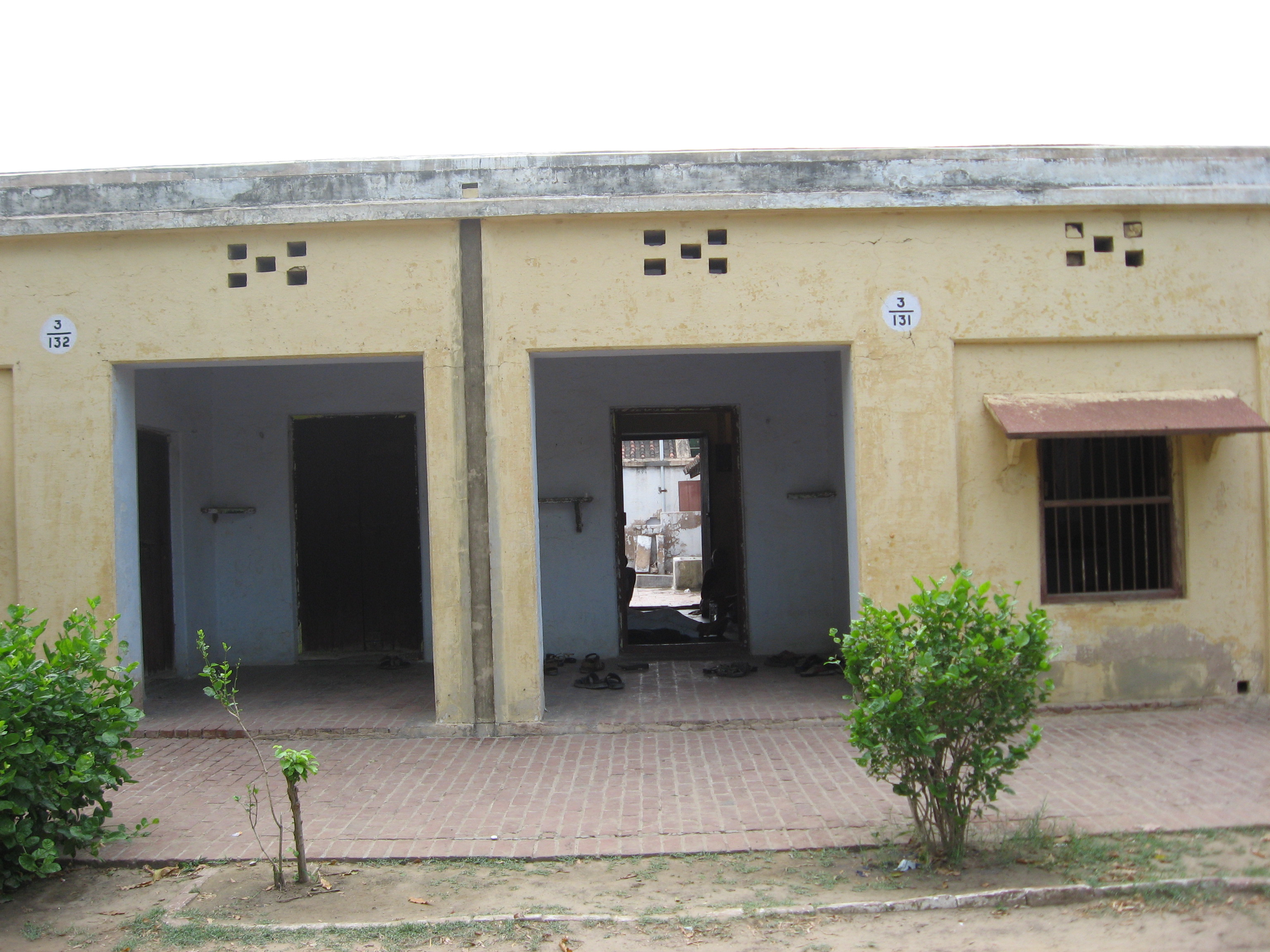
A typical house in the residential streets of Dayalbagh.

== Soami bagh ==
Soami bagh is an area adjacent to Dayalbagh. The land was purchased by Soami Ji Maharaj. Soami Ji's Samadhi [place of achieving Nirvana] has been under construction since building began in 1905 by Guru Maharaj Saheb, and continues till today.

The construction involves piece of art work. A variety of fruits, vegetables and flowers are carved out on walls and pillars on Marble stone.

== Health care ==
There is a hospital called as "Saran Ashram Hospital" with a maternity ward. Facilities exist for ophthalmic and dental treatment, ultrasound, ECG, and pathological and X-Ray testing. All consultations and treatment are free for everyone. The majority of patients are from outside Dayalbagh. There are also homeopathic and ayurvedic dispensaries.

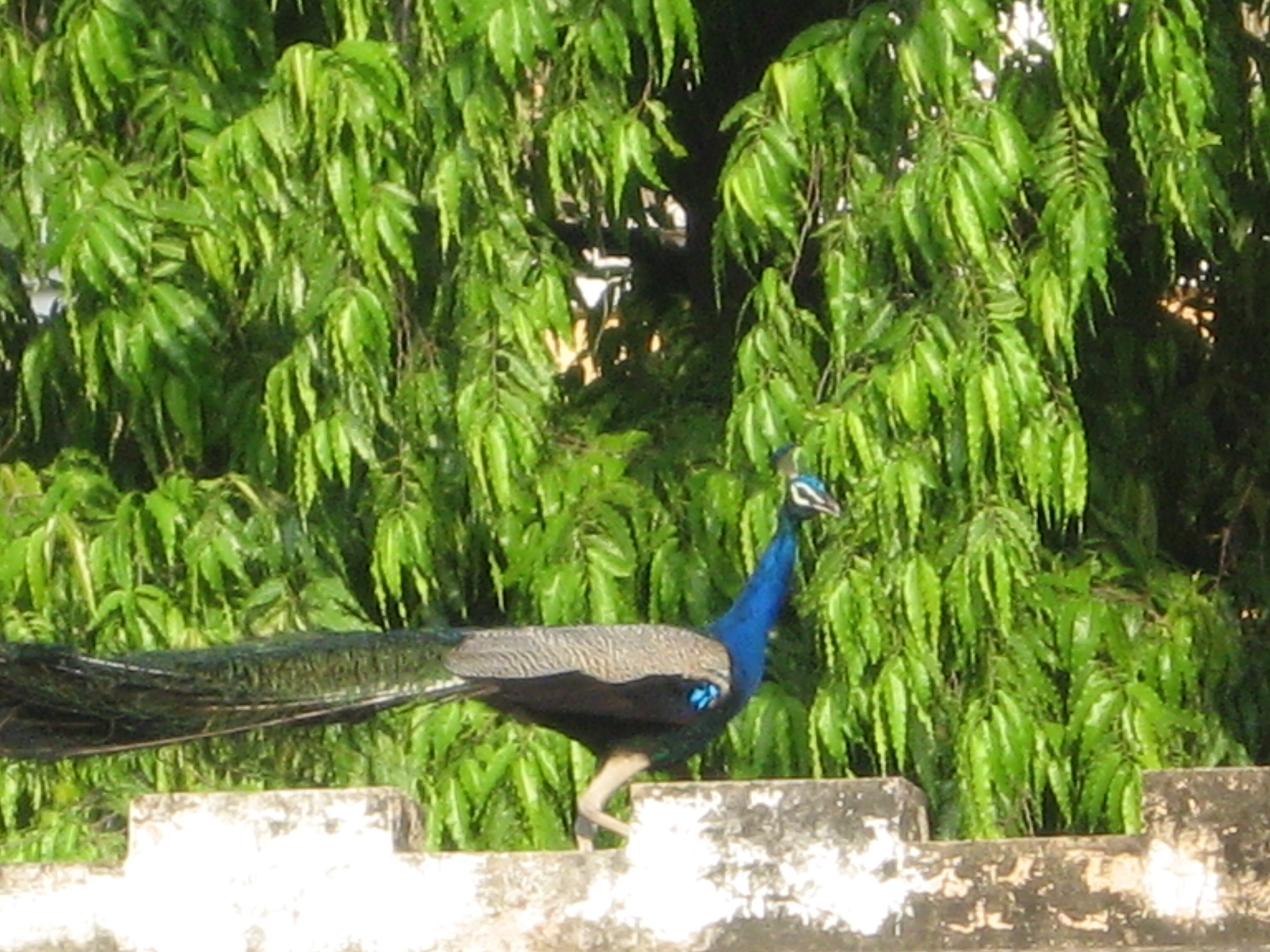
Peacocks are common in the residential areas of Dayalbagh

The day in Dayalbagh begins with congregational prayers, followed by physical fitness exercise and work on the farms and in colony by way of service, where after people go to their respective vocations. The day ends with prayers in the evening.

== Industries ==
Small-scale industries known as the Model Industries were established in 1916 to provide employment and a source of livelihood to the persons residing in the colony. It has done some pioneering work in the country. The industries have now been decentralized and cottage scale production of goods of daily necessity is taking place in units set up by Satsangis all over the country.

The Radhasoami Urban Cooperative Bank and the Dayalbagh Mahila Bank cater to the financial requirements of various organizations and individuals in the colony. The Dayalbagh Printing Press prints Holy Books and the two Satsang weeklies, one in English (also available in its e-version) and the other in Hindi.

== Dayalbagh Educational Institute ==
The foundation of a school was laid after 2 years of the foundation of the colony in 1917. The school has grown in course of time to become a Deemed University-Dayalbagh Educational Institute-with various faculties with facilities for research. In 1981 the Ministry of Education, Government of India, conferred the status of an institution deemed to be a University on the Dayalbagh Educational Institute, to implement the new program of undergraduate studies. Prof. M. B. Lal Sahab, a former Vice Chancellor of the Lucknow University, founded this institution and was also the first director of DEI The education system followed is unique and provides value-based multi-disciplinary education with work experience. In addition, the colony has a diploma level Technical College, a Women's Polytechnic, a nursery, primary level schools and secondary level colleges for boys and girls; a school of Languages; a School of Art and Culture; a Tailoring School; a School of Dress Designing and Interior Decoration; a Day Boarding School; a Training Center for Indian Music; and a Leather Working School. The campus is situated in Dayalbagh, away from the noise of the city. It is situated at a distance of about two Km. from the city of Agra on its northern periphery. It is conveniently connected to the railway stations and bus-stands by the city bus, rickshaws, auto-rickshaws and taxi(s).

The institute gained national attention when Neha Sharma, a PhD. scholar was found murdered in the nano-biotechnology lab. Students of the Dayalbagh Educational Institute protested on the streets of Agra to demand justice.

== Other colonies in Dayalbagh suburb of Agra ==
New residential colonies have developed around Dayalbagh, such as Tagore Nagar, Adan Bagh, Sarla Bagh, Heera Bagh, Mehar Bagh, Kabir Nagar, Saraswati Puram, Punjabi Bagh Pushpanjali etc. The residents of these new colonies follow religions and faiths of their choice and not necessarily Radha Soami faith. This area is also called New Agra where many people have settled down around 100 ft Road.
