= Satguru =

Religious teacher

Satguru (Sanskrit: सत्गुरु), or sadguru (Sanskrit: सद्गुरु), means a "true guru" in Sanskrit. The term is distinguished from other forms of gurus, such as musical instructors, scriptural teachers, parents, and so on. A satguru has some special characteristics that are not found in any other types of spiritual guru. Satguru is a title given specifically only to an enlightened rishi or sant whose life's purpose is to guide the initiated shishya on the spiritual path, the summation of which is the realization of the Self through realization of God.

== Hinduism ==
According to Sivaya Subramuniyaswami, a Hindu satguru is always a sannyasin, an unmarried renunciate, but not all writers include this stricture. Tukaram, a Hindu satguru, is known to have had a family. Satguru Kabir had a son, Kamal, who was very devout.

The words sant and satguru were prominently used in the spiritual ideology of Kabir in the 15th century. Kabir says "satpurush ko jansi, Tiska satguru naam", meaning the one who has seen the supreme lord of truth (satya purush) is satguru. Kabir wrote "Devi dewal jagat mein, kotik poojey koye. Satguru ki pooja kiye, sabb ki pooja hoye", meaning that worship of satguru includes in it worship of all deities. In other words, satguru is the physical form of God (sat purusha).

In one of Kabir's songs the satguru is described as the real sadhu:

He is the real Sadhu, who can reveal the form of the Formless to the vision of these eyes;
Who teaches the simple way of attaining Him, that is other than rites or ceremonies;
Who does not make you close the doors, and hold the breath, and renounce the world;
Who makes you perceive the Supreme Spirit wherever the mind attaches itself;
Who teaches you to be still in the midst of all your activities.
Ever immersed in bliss, having no fear in his mind, he keeps the spirit of union in the midst of all enjoyments.
The infinite dwelling of the Infinite Being is everywhere: in earth, water, sky, and air;
Firm as the thunderbolt, the seat of the seeker is established above the void.
He who is within is without: I see Him and none else.

Vasishtha, Rama's guru, was the satguru in the Treta Yuga. Swami Shankar Purushottam Tirtha quoted the Yoga Vasistha regarding the "real preceptor" (satguru):

A real preceptor is one who can produce blissful sensation in the body of the disciple by their sight, touch, or instructions.

In Sant Mat and Advait Mat, the living satguru is considered the path to God-realization.

== Sikhism ==
In Sikh philosophy, Nanak, defines satguru as truth itself and not a physical entity. This truth emanates from reality and requires no blind faith. In the Japji Sahib he writes "Ek onkar, satguru prasad", which means "there is one creator, [this knowledge I have learned] by the grace of God". The Sikh (student) learns from reality as presented by the creator. Truth (sat) itself is the teacher (guru).

The recommendation says that the first and the foremost qualification of the satguru is that he must have known the True Lord (God) himself.

== Syncretic traditions ==
Meher Baba equated worship of the satguru with worship of God:

Consciously or unconsciously, directly or indirectly, each and every creature, each and every human being — in one form or the other — strives to assert individuality. But when eventually man consciously experiences that he is Infinite, Eternal and Indivisible, then he is fully conscious of his individuality as God, and as such experiences Infinite Knowledge, Infinite Power and Infinite Bliss. Thus Man becomes God, and is recognized as a Perfect Master, Satguru, or Kutub. To worship this Man is to worship God.

According to Dada Bhagwan, a satguru must maintain self-knowledge:

It is very difficult to define and identify someone as a satguru. In the language of the scriptures, whom can you call a satguru? Sat is the Atma (the Soul, the Self); so, whoever has attained the Soul, that guru is a satguru! Therefore, an 'Atmagnani (knower of the Soul, Self-realized) can be called a satguru, for he has experienced the Self. Not all gurus have Atma Gnan. So, the one who continuously remains as the eternal element - the Self - is a satguru! The Gnani Purush is a satguru.

== Satsang ==
A satsang is an audience with a satguru for religious instruction. The name satsang is a Sanskrit word that means "gathering together for the truth" or, more simply, "being with the truth". Truth is what is real, what exists.

== See also ==
- List of Hindu gurus and sants
