= 2018 in Sri Lanka =

- Decades: 1990s; 2000s; 2010s; 2020s
- See also: Other events of 2018; Timeline of Sri Lankan history

Events in the year 2018 in Sri Lanka.

== Incumbents ==
- President – Maithripala Sirisena
- Prime Minister – Ranil Wickramasinghe
- Chief Justice – Priyasath Dep

=== Governors ===
- Central Province –
  - until 11 April: Niluka Ekanayake
  - 11 April-13 April: Reginald Cooray
  - starting 13 April: P. B. Dissanayake
- Eastern Province – Rohitha Bogollagama
- North Central Province – P. B. Dissanayake (until 11 April); M. P. Jayasinghe (starting 11 April)
- Northern Province – Reginald Cooray (until 31 December)
- North Western Province – Amara Piyaseeli Ratnayake (until 11 April); K. C. Logeswaran (starting 11 April)
- Sabaragamuwa Province – Marshal Perera (until 11 April); Niluka Ekanayake (starting 11 April)
- Southern Province – Hemakumara Nanayakkara (until 11 April); Marshal Perera (starting 11 April)
- Uva Province –
  - until 11 April: M. P. Jayasinghe
  - 12 April-10 May: P. B. Dissanayake
  - starting 10 May: Ariya Rekawa
- Western Province – K. C. Logeswaran (until 12 April); Hemakumara Nanayakkara (starting 12 April)

=== Chief Ministers ===
- Central Province – Sarath Ekanayake
- Eastern Province – vacant
- North Central Province – vacant
- Northern Province – C. V. Vigneswaran (starting 23 October)
- North Western Province – Dharmasiri Dassanayake
- Sabaragamuwa Province – vacant
- Southern Province – Shan Wijayalal De Silva
- Uva Province – Chamara Sampath Dassanayake
- Western Province – Isura Devapriya

== Events ==
=== January ===
- 21 January – A 44 year old motorist was shot dead in Kataragama by the police after defying the orders when riding the motorcycle, which led to turmoil and confusion in the Kataragama area as the police opened tear gas to control and disperse bystanders after the unusual incident at the religious area.
- 23 January – The official trophy for the 2018 FIFA World Cup was brought to Sri Lanka and was kept in Colombo for 2 days and was displayed to the public as part of the 2018 FIFA World Cup Trophy Tour, in which the trophy would travel across 52 nations. This was the first time Sri Lanka was selected as one of the nations to officially showcase the trophy in history.

=== February ===
- 4 February
  - Sri Lanka celebrated its 70th Independence Day.
  - Arjun Alosysius and Kasun Palisena were arrested at around 7.30 AM regarding the alleged treasury bond scam issues.
- 10 February – 2018 Sri Lankan local elections were conducted to elect 8293 members to the 341 local authorities.
- 23 February – Komaali Kings, a Sri Lankan Tamil-language film released on this day becomes the first Sri Lankan Tamil-language mass-budgeted film in 40 years. The film also marks the rebirth of Sri Lankan Tamil Cinema as it released in across 50 theatres in the nation.
- 27 February – 2018 anti-Muslim riots in Sri Lanka: Riots began in the town of Ampara between Sinhalese and Muslim groups. Mosques, restaurants and muslim civilians were targeted during the riots over alleged rumours that unwanted chemicals were being added to food items in Muslim restaurants, within the vicinity of the temple junction in Ampara.

=== March ===
- 2 March – 2018 anti-Muslim riots in Sri Lanka: Riots began spreading from Udispattuwa and Teldeniya to Digana and other areas in the Kandy District. Several Muslim businesses, mosques and shops were attacked by Sinhalese mobs following the death of a Buddhist male following an assault by 4 intoxicated Muslim youths on 22 February. Following the violence in Kandy, the Sri Lankan government declared a state of emergency across the nation for 10 days.
- 6 March – 2018 Nidahas Trophy was a Tri-Nations tournament held from 6 March to 18 March to celebrate 70 years of Sri Lankan independence.
- 8 March – The funeral of Ven. Daranagama Kusaladhamma Thero proceeded with state of honour on 8 March 2018 in Colombo.
- 21 March – Internationally acclaimed documentary Demons in Paradise was released in Sri Lanka after its world premiere at the 2017 Cannes Film Festival.

=== May ===
- 2 May – The final rites of the veteran film director Lester James Peiris proceeded with the state patronage.
- 19 May – Floods began as a result of heavy rainfall, starting from 19 May, resulting in severe damages throughout the island. The floods left 13 dead, 23 missing and over 100,000 affected due to torrential floods.
- 24 May – Ranjan de Silva, politician and father of Sri Lankan national cricketer Dhananjaya de Silva, was shot dead by unknown people.
- 26 May
  - 2018 cricket pitch fixing and betting scandal: Al Jazeera exposed tampering in the Galle International Stadium pitch previously in a test match against Australia in 2016 and in a match against India in 2017. The groundsman and Sri Lankan first-class cricketer Tharindu Mendis were accused and were investigated by the International Cricket Council for attempting another Galle Pitch tampering scandal prior to the start of the first test match against England in November 2018.
  - Sri Lankan marine biologist Asha de Vos was awarded the Golden Alumni Award in the Professional Achievement category at the first edition of the British Council Golden Alumni awards.
- 28 May – Sri Lankan veteran film and teledrama actress Deepani Silva was arrested and released on bail by the Bandaragama Police for her involvement in a car accident with three wheeler which left a 10-year-old child critically injured.
- 31 May
  - The Sri Lankan Cricket Elections which were scheduled to be held on 31 May 2018 were cancelled the day before following a stay order issued by the Court of Appeal, after a petition was filed against Sri Lankan Cricket Board president Thilanga Sumathipala contesting in the elections.
  - A new map of Sri Lanka was officially released, with updates on Colombo City jointly with the Colombo Port city. This was the first time the map of Sri Lanka was renewed in 18 years.

=== June ===
- 16 June – Dinesh Chandimal was found to be guilty of ball tampering during the second test match between Sri Lanka and the West Indies. Video evidence showed that on the second day, Chandimal took sweets out of his left pocket and put them in his mouth, before applying saliva to the ball within the space of a few seconds. Two on-field umpires Ian Gould, Aleem Dar, television umpire Richard Kettleborough and match referee Javagal Srinath observed the video footage carefully and charged him with one test ban and two demerit points.

=== July ===
- 11 July
  - It was reported that Sri Lanka is going to reinstate Capital punishment for drug dealers, president Maithripala Sirisena told the government, which earlier had unanimously backed the reinstatement of capital punishment, that he "was ready to sign the death warrants".
  - The ICC concluded its hearing on the trio including Dinesh Chandimal, who had pleaded guilty to a level three spirit of cricket offence. His hearing took place before the start of the first Test against South Africa, with him found guilty. He received a two-match ban, with Suranga Lakmal captaining the side in his place.
- 15 July – The scheduled inaugural edition of the Lankan Premier League which was supposed to be held in August 2018 was indefinitely postponed as a result of the change in country's cricket administration.
- 16 July – The independent Judicial Commissioner handed down a further eight suspension points with maximum possible punishment for their spirit of cricket offence and suspended Chandimal for four ODIs as well.

=== August ===
- 18 August – Akalanka Peiris became the first ever Sri Lankan student to sit for a Sri Lankan GCE A/L examinations outside Sri Lanka as he was granted special permission to write A/L exams in Jakarta, Indonesia just prior to his preparations for the 2018 Asian Games.
- 26 August – Sri Lanka clinched maiden Carrom World Cup title in men's team event defeating defending champion India at the 2018 Carrom World Cup and also secured the second place in the women's team event.

=== September ===
- 5 September – The Jana Balaya Kolambata protest rally organized by the Joint Opposition took place in Colombo.
- 6 September – Alaina B. Teplitz is appointed the US Ambassador to Sri Lanka and the Maldives by the US Senate.
- 9 September – Sri Lanka clinched the 2018 Asian Netball Championships title, defeating Singapore 69-50, which was also Sri Lanka's 5th Championship Title and Tharjini Sivalingam was awarded player of the tournament.
- 10 September – Former President Mahinda Rajapaksa visits India on a three-day visit.
- 15 September – Sri Lanka hosts the 2018 Asian Men's Volleyball Challenge Cup, the inaugural edition of the Asian Men's Volleyball Challenge Cup tournament, as the Sri Lankan men's national volleyball team finished 3rd in the inaugural tournament.
- 21 September – Former President Chandrika Kumaratunga becomes the first Sri Lankan to receive the French highest honour award (Commandeur de la Legion of Honour).
- 29 September – The BMS Campus (Business Management School) of Sri Lanka won the 2018 edition of the Red Bull Campus Cricket World Finals by 4 wickets to lift its second world title.

=== October ===
- 6-13 October – Sri Lanka registered the best ever medal tally in an Asian Para Games - 13 medals including 4 gold medals at the 2018 Asian Para Games.
- 15 October – Parami Wasanthi Maristela won Sri Lanka's first ever Youth Olympics medal, a bronze in the girls' 2000 metre steeplechase athletics event during the 2018 Summer Youth Olympics representing Sri Lanka.
- 26 October – 2018 Sri Lankan constitutional crisis: Prime Minister Ranil Wickremesinghe is sacked by President Maithripala Sirisena and is replaced by Mahinda Rajapaksa, resulting in a constitutional crisis.

=== November ===
- 9 November
  - 2018 Sri Lankan constitutional crisis: Maithripala Sirisena dissolves Parliament by proclamation, from midnight of 9 November and declared snap elections to be held on around 5 January 2019.
  - Rangana Herath retired from international cricket with 433 test wickets as the most successful left arm spinner.
- 27 November – According to Matthew was released in Sri Lanka and Australia.
- 30 November – Sri Lanka national deaf cricket team won their maiden Deaf T20 World Cup after emerging victorious at the 2018 Deaf T20 World Cup defeating India by 36 runs.
- 2018 Sri Lankan constitutional crisis: The Constitutional Court rules President Sirisena's dissolution of parliament illegal. Mahinda Rajapaksa fails to form a government that commands a parliamentary majority and Prime Minister Ranil Wickremesinghe reassumes office.

=== December ===
- 15 December – Sri Lanka Emerging Team defeated India by 3 runs to win the 2018 ACC Emerging Teams Asia Cup.
- 16 December
  - 2018 Sri Lankan constitutional crisis: President Maithripala Sirisena reinstates Ranil Wickremesinghe in the position of Prime Minister, ending the constitutional coup.
  - Lucion Pushparaj became the first ever Sri Lankan to win the World Bodybuilding Championship during the 2018 World Bodybuilding Championship.
- 22 December – Flash floods in the Northern Province caused by heavy rains leave one dead and more than 75,000 people were reported to be affected.

== Deaths ==
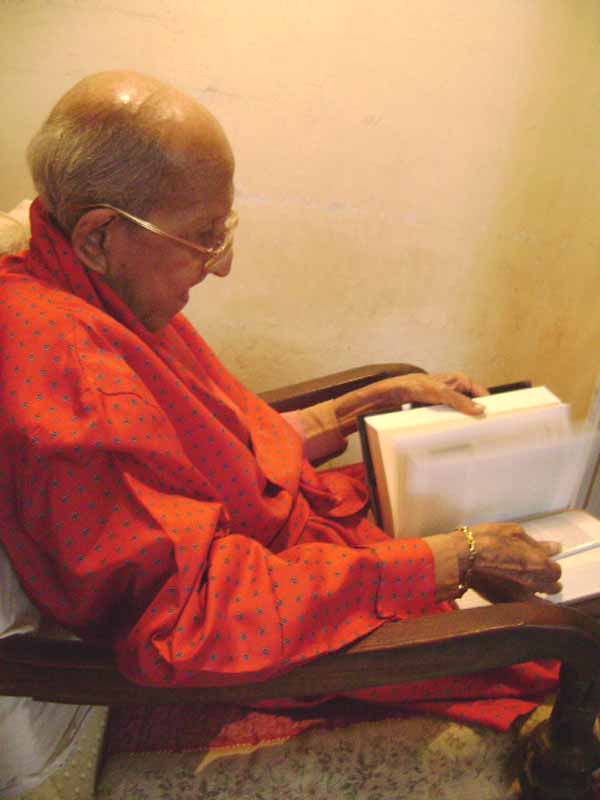
Lester James Peiris (b. 1919)

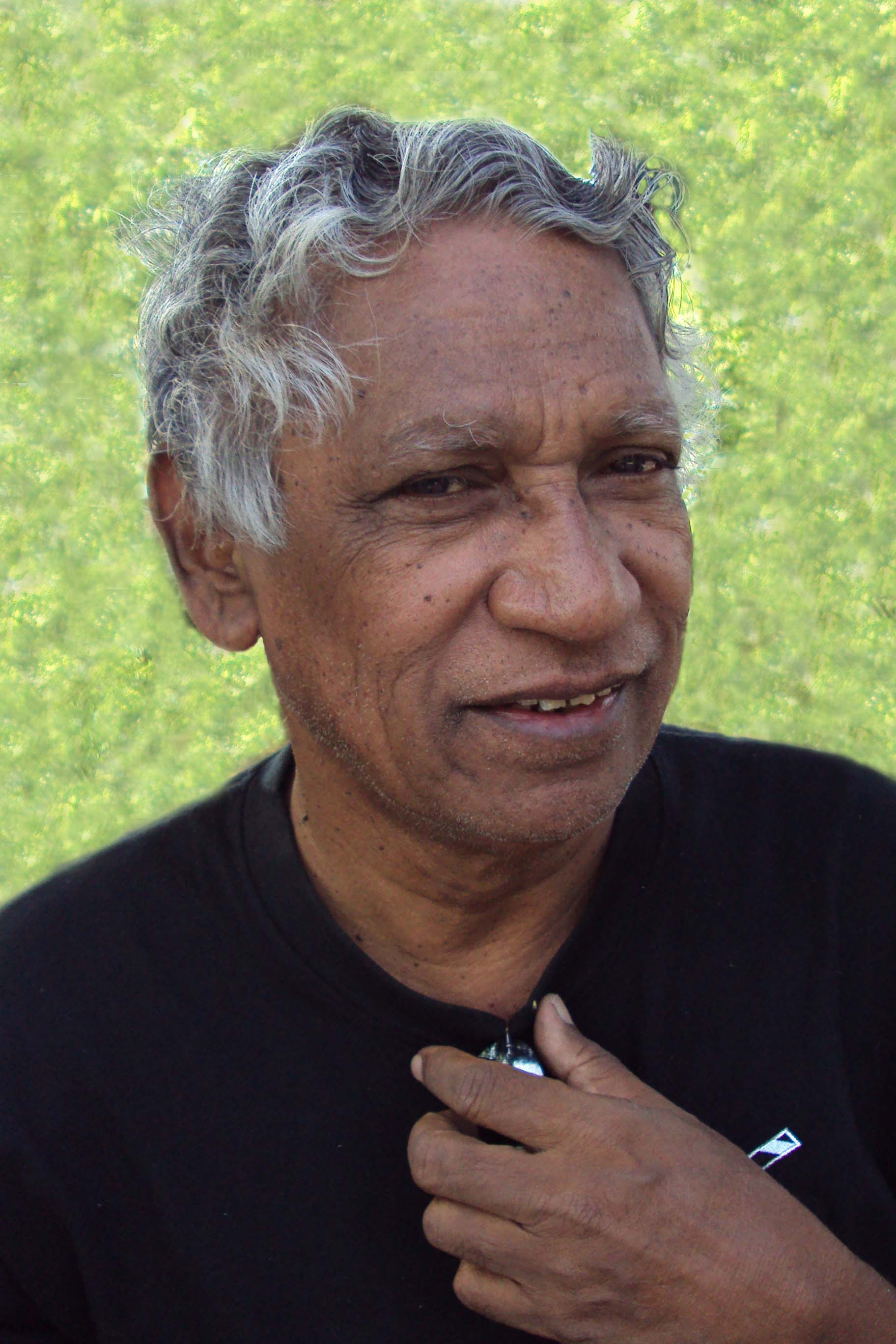
Dharmasena Pathiraja (b. 1943)

=== January ===
- 4 January
  - Sujatha Weerasekara, 85 (actress)
  - Francis Wanniarachchi, 71 (media personality)
- 5 January – Gihan Wikramanayake, academic (b. 1960).
- 6 January – Adeesha Kanchana, 50 (actor)
- 10 January – Lucian de Alwis, Puisne Justice of the Supreme Court of Sri Lanka
- 22 January – A. E. Manoharan, 73 (singer)
- 28 January – Dharmasena Pathiraja, 74 (filmmaker)

=== February ===
- 2 February – Most Venerabale Professor Bellanwila Wimalarathana Thero, 77 (Buddhist monk)
- 11 February – Ashoka Pieris, 50 (musician)
- 18 February – Kandiah Neelakandan, lawyer (b. 1947).

=== March ===
- 3 March
  - Ven. Daranagama Kusaladhamma Thero (b. 1963).
  - Arawwala Nandimithra, 78 (literary)
- 4 March – Irene de Alwis, 73 (singer)
- 14 March
  - Vasantha Vaidyanathan
  - Edna Sugathapala, 72 (actress)
- 25 March – Saliya Dias, 73 (art director)
- 27 February – Chandrasiri Dodangoda, 67 (author)

=== April ===
- 7 April
  - U. W. Premaratne, 71 (production manager)
  - Rathnawali Kekunawela, 87 (actress)
- 16 April – Thushani de Silva, 27 (actress)
- 21 June – Sadath Gamini Wickramasinghe, 78 (musician)
- 29 April – Lester James Peiris, 99 (filmmaker)

=== May ===
- 1 May – Priyantha Fernando, 65 (singer)
- 27 May – W. D. Nimal Perera, 75 (cinematographer)
- 29 May – K. A. Dharmadasa, 83 (drum player)

=== June ===
- 2 June – Athagama Ebert Amarasena, 79 (poet)
- 3 June – Monica Weerasinghe, (actress)
- 5 June – Hema Nalin Karunaratne, 55 (media personality)
- 9 June – Somaweera Senanayake, 73 (screenwriter)
- 13 June – Cyril Perera, 73 (musician)
- 15 June – Kamal J. Bernard, 65 (lyricist)
- 18 June – Ivor Dennis, 86 (singer)
- 20 June – Jayampathi Wimaladharma, 63 (actor)
- 25 June – Cyril Perera, 73 (musician)
- 29 June
  - S. Karunaratne, 78 (dramatist)
  - Rohana Maddumarala, 77 (lyricist)
- 30 June
  - Athula Somasiri, 77 (singer)
  - Chmara Lakshan, 39 (newspaper editor)
  - Roy de Silva, 80 (filmmaker)

=== July ===
- 3 July – Piyasena Ihalavithana, 82 (journalist)
- 7 July – Sarath Dharmasiri, 56 (photographer)
- 8 July – Priyani Jayasinghe, 51 (singer)
- 11 July – Ruwan Hewage, 67 (actor)
- 14 July – Stanley de Silva, 84 (theater actor)
- 15 July – Rupa Kodithuwakku, (author)
- 16 July – Rita Tampoe, 80 (actress)
- 23 July
  - Tissa Gunawardena, 85 (dramatist)
  - W. Ranjith Perera, 71 (director)
- 24 July – Indika Ginige, 37 (actor)
- 25 July – Daya Kumarage, (journalist)
- 27 July – Soma Kiriella, (dramatist)
- 29 July – Lloyd Gunawardena, 55 (actor)

=== August ===
- 1 August – Raja K. Seneviratne, 73 (dramatist)
- 2 August – Nanda Wilegoda, 82 (actress)
- 7 August – Gihan Rathnayake, 32 (musician)
- 8 August – Indrajith Navinna, 70 (actor)
- 17 August – Balangoda Sarath Madu, 69 (artist)
- 24 August – Edwin Batawala, 76 (artist)

=== September ===
- 11 September – Berty Thalagala, 83 (production manager)
- 14 September – K. D. G. Wimalaratne, 79 (former Director of National Archives)
- 24 September – Francis Ranasinghe, 64 (journalist)

=== October ===
- 1 October – Ronnie Leitch, 64 (singer, actor).
- 2 October – Sunil Premakumara, 62 (actor)
- 16 October – Amara Ranatunga, 79 (songstress)

=== November ===
- 1 November – Douglas Perera, 90 (actor)
- 5 November – Harish Jayaratne, 67 (actor)

=== December ===
- 12 December
  - Upali Kannangara, 67 (singer)
  - Prince Casinader, 92 (politician)
