= Kengalla =

Coordinates: 7°18′N 80°43′E

Kengalla pahalawela
- Village
- Interactive map of Kengalla
- Country: Sri Lanka
- Province: Central Province
- Time zone: UTC+5:30 (Sri Lanka Standard Time)

Kengalla is a village in Sri Lanka. It is located within Central Province. It is a small village in Sri Lanka about 10 km (6.2 mi) away from the city of Kandy.

Kengalla ෙකන්ගල්ල
Village
Country	Sri Lanka
Province	Central Province
District	Kandy
Time zone	UTC+5:30 (Sri Lanka Standard Time)

== History ==
Originally, Kengalla area was a coffee and cocoa plantation in the times of British occupation in Kandy. As a result of the construction of Victoria Dam under Accelerated Mahaweli Development Programme (AMDP), displaced people of Teldeniya and Kundasale were settled in Kengalla area in the early 1980s.

Kengalla Ambalama was built in 1907, more than 100 years ago by a tea planter and a member of the Nayak dynasty who ruled the Kandyan Kingdom from 1739 to 1815. This 100-year-old ambalama has an interesting story combined with historical facts.

== Geography ==
Kengalla is located in Dumbara Valley of Sri Lanka. The Pallekele International Cricket Stadium is situated in Kengalla.

== See also ==
- List of towns in Central Province, Sri Lanka
