= 2018 anti-Muslim riots in Sri Lanka =

Religious riots in Sri Lanka

Anti-Muslim riots in Sri Lanka
- Location: Ampara and Kandy District, Sri Lanka
- Date: 26 February – 10 March 2018 (UTC+05:30)
- Target: Mosques, Muslim-owned property, and Muslim civilians
- Attack type: Widespread looting, assault, arson
- Deaths: 2
- Injuries: Ampara District: 5 Kandy District: 10
- Motive: Kandy – Fatal assault on a Sinhalese lorry driver by four Muslim youths Ampara – Allegations of 'sterilization pills' in food served at a Muslim-owned eatery

The 2018 anti-Muslim riots in Sri Lanka were a series of religious riots targeting Muslims that began in the town of Ampara located in Sri Lanka on 26 February 2018, spreading to the Kandy District from 2 March until its end on 10 March 2018.

Muslim citizens, mosques, and other properties were attacked by mobs of Sinhalese Buddhists. The Government of Sri Lanka undertook a forceful crackdown on the rioting by imposing a state of emergency and deploying the Sri Lankan Armed Forces to assist the police in the affected areas. By 9 March, the riots were mostly under control. Two fatalities and ten injuries were reported among Sinhalese, Muslims, and the police. According to the police, 45 incidents of damage to houses and businesses were reported, while four places of worship were attacked. The police arrested 81 persons in connection with the rioting.

Rioting in the Kandy District began in Udispattuwa and Teldeniya, later spreading to Digana, Tennekumbura, and other surrounding areas. It all began when a truck driver of Sinhalese ethnicity was assaulted by four Muslim youths following a traffic accident. The truck driver died of his injuries four days later. In response to this, on 5 March, Sinhalese mobs began attacking Muslim properties in the region, resulting in widespread damage to property.

Groups of local Sinhalese youth organized by Buddhist monks protected mosques from attackers. Sri Lankan cricketers Mahela Jayawardena, Kumar Sangakkara, and Sanath Jayasuriya condemned the attacks, and nearly 300 mostly Sinhalese volunteers rebuilt a Muslim business in Anamaduwa. The riots were the first large-scale demonstrations of Buddhist-Muslim sectarian violence since 2014, and prompted the Government of Sri Lanka to declare a state of emergency for ten days, in addition to the police curfew already imposed on the district. The state of emergency was the first such since 2011.

Social media networks including WhatsApp, Facebook, Twitter and Instagram were blocked in parts of the country to prevent mobs from organizing their attacks and spreading propaganda. However, the block on social media networks was lifted after 72 hours. After three days of raids in the main town of Kandy, at least 81 people were reported to have been arrested in connection with the incident by the Terrorism Investigation Division (TID) of the Sri Lankan police, including the main suspect Amith Jeevan Weerasinghe. The police officers stated that the unusual situation which prevailed in the country for a few days had been brought under control, but tight security was imposed in a few parts of the nation as the predicted threats had been focused on the Muslim prayers on 9 March 2018. The riots were denounced by Buddhist monks, and many Sinhalese and Buddhist monks rallied to protect and help Muslims and Mosques during the prayers across the country. According to the government, independent observers, Muslims and Sinhalese in the area, the majority of the rioters came from other areas of Sri Lanka to carry out the riots.

The government revealed that nearly 465 houses, businesses and vehicles were destroyed and promised to compensate the families who were severely affected due to the communal violence.

A few weeks after the end of the anti-Muslim riots, new CCTV footage revealed that some police officials aided the rioters. Furthermore, politicians belonging to the Sri Lanka Podujana Peramuna (SLPP), the party of former president Mahinda Rajapaksa, were seen during the riots. The party claimed that they were trying to calm the rioters, while the government accused them of helping the rioters. The activity caused an investigation by the police officials. It was confirmed that the deficiencies and ineffective attitudes of the police were to be investigated and questioned by the Sri Lankan government. Officials were later arrested on charges of torching a mosque but were granted bail after it was found that the mosque was not torched.

== Background ==
Despite coexisting peacefully for the most part, many Sinhalese have a history of being suspicious of Muslims, believing that their slightly higher birth rates threaten their demographic supremacy, while others view Muslim businessmen as exploiting poor Sinhalese. Some political analysts believe that Sinhalese extremists are trying to transfer the remaining hostility against Tamils onto the mostly Tamil-speaking Muslim population. Moreover, it is alleged that the increasing Arab influence over Sri Lankan Muslim culture in recent years including the construction of a large number of mosques financed by Arab countries and the adoption of the niqab by Muslim women which diverges from the traditional dress has increased the suspicions between the two communities.

Sri Lanka has seen several communal violence charged incidents between the majority Sinhala community and the country's Muslim minority. Ampara District has experienced tensions since 2017, with Buddhist groups accusing Muslims of forced conversions and vandalizing Buddhist archaeological sites.

The recent communal violence in Kandy is the first since the Black July violence which occurred in 1983 between Tamils and Sinhalese Buddhists. This violence is also the first time such communal violence has occurred between Muslims and Buddhists in the district of Kandy since the 1915 Ceylonese riots which were incited by the British administration.

== Riots and Violence ==
=== Ampara ===
An aggressive mob had openly ignited attacks on several shops in the surrounding area of Ampara. Hotels in the vicinity of the mosque were also attacked by the mobs, with the police unable to bring the situation under control. The Special Task Force (STF) and police reinforcements were then dispatched from nearby police stations which dispersed the mobs.

Areas with larger Muslim populations in Maruthamunai, Sammanthurai, Akkaraipattu, Addalaichenai and Kalmunai in Ampara District were conducting Hartals, as a response against the anti-Muslim riots. The protests resulted in 8 buses being damaged. 31 Muslims were arrested who were damaging public property and released after a warning.

=== Kandy ===
The first signs of violence were reported from Udispattuwa on the night of 2 March as the body of a victim of Buddhist-targeted violence was being taken to Ambala, groups set tires alight on the road as a sign of protest against the killing; the police, anticipating violence, deployed 1000 Special Task Force personnel in and around the area, encompassing Moragahamula, Udispattuwa, Teldeniya and Ambagahalanda. Despite these efforts, two Muslim-owned shops in Moragahamula were subjected to arson on the night of 4 March. 28 suspects were later arrested for their involvement in the fires. General disorderly behavior and violence associated with the killing by the residents of Teldeniya and outlying areas were also reported.

The uproar began to spread to Digana by the morning of 5 March, when a large mob converged on the town, setting fire to a mosque, shops and houses. In response, police used tear gas and water cannons in an attempt to disperse the crowd, which saw retaliation from the mob who threw various projectiles, while the violence spread to more residences, shops and nearby vehicles. Traffic along the A26 was forced to a halt, and by 3 PM, the police requested the support of the Sri Lanka Army, which deployed 200 troops from the Sinha Regiment base in Digana in the evening. The police then followed up by declaring a district-wide curfew in Kandy until 6 AM on 6 March; the same curfew was re-imposed on Teldeniya and Pallekele at 8 PM on 6 March, after the body of a 24-year-old Muslim male was discovered within the remains of a shop in Digana. By the evening of 6 March, a total of 4 mosques, 37 houses, 46 shops and 35 vehicles were damaged or destroyed as a result of the riots in both Digana and other locations in the Kandy District; 1 confirmed fatality was reported.

On the night of 6 March, mobs were seen in Lewella and Balagolla, moving towards Tennekumbura and the general direction of Kandy. Soon after, an arson attack on a mosque in Tennekumbura was reported. Reports noted that on this day a Buddhist man had died after being beaten by a group of Muslim men who were upset over a traffic violation. According to sources, At 2 PM on 22 February 2018, a Sinhalese lorry driver from Ambala, Medamahanuwara was assaulted by four Muslim youths in Karaliyadda, Teldeniya. The victim was admitted to the intensive care unit of the National Hospital (Teaching Hospital) Kandy and died on the night of 2 March from his injuries. The victim's assistant (also traveling in the lorry) was assaulted, admitted to the hospital, and later discharged after treatment.

The motive behind the attack has not been established. Some reports state it stemmed from a road accident where the trucker had damaged the wing mirror of an auto rickshaw the assailants had been travelling in while attempting to overtake it; all four suspects were reported to have been intoxicated. The suspects were arrested by the police on the day of the attack and remanded until 7 March. High ambulance activity was reported from Menikhinna, and 7 people were arrested there for disorderly behavior and for causing unrest. Three police officers were injured. Curfew imposed on the evening of 6 March was lifted briefly in the morning of 7 March but was soon re-imposed. 7 March also saw Muslim residents of Mullegama barricading themselves inside a local mosque after a Sinhalese mob attacked their homes alleging theft of a donation box from a nearby Buddhist temple; the Muslims accused the police of inaction in the face of the mobs. One Sinhalese male was reported to have died and another was injured in an explosion of unknown origin in the course of the Mullegama attacks. Some media reported that his injuries were sustained in an attack carried out by Muslim men. As a reaction to a statement made by a Buddhist monk at the Mullegama temple, a projectile attack against his temple was carried out by Muslims earlier in the day.

Katugastota also saw anti-Muslim violence and arson, while a mob assembled in the Ambatanna town center after a rumor that a temple was being attacked. The mob then proceeded to damage property and engaged in rioting.

=== Other districts ===
Small incidents were reported in other districts against Muslims. A tire was burned in front of a mosque in Medina Nagar, Vavuniya. However, the police and army controlled the situation and protected the mosque. Some shops belonging to Muslims were damaged and some shop workers were assaulted in Ambatenna, Matale. A grenade blast left one dead. The incident occurred despite a ban on social media networks designed to reduce bloodshed.

== Response ==
Sri Lankan police arrested at least 81 rioters including Amith Jeevan Weerasinghe, the leader of the Sinhalese Buddhist nationalist Mahason Balakaya who is believed to be the leading figure among the rioters alongside Suredha Suraweera who was also arrested. Ampitiye Sumanarathana Thera was also seen alongside Amith during the riot and also demanded the release of those arrested by the police but Thera was not arrested. Sumanarathana Thera is known for his active participation in violence against Tamils and Muslims. Further, the main suspects were brought to Colombo for further enquiries.

A panel of three retired judges was appointed by the Sri Lankan President to probe into the anti-Muslim riots to inquire into the incidents which took place in areas such as Digana and Teldeniya.

The newly appointed Minister of Law and Order, Ranjith Madduma Bandara stated that the current Sri Lankan government is planning to bring fresh legislation to ensure a code of conduct for the operation of social media networks in Sri Lanka by the international practices to avoid unethical false claims, and rumours which have been spread by many suspicious people through social media. The Minister also said that the law enforcement authorities and agencies have arrested people for conducting alleged hate campaigns regarding the ethnic riots between Muslims and Buddhists which prevailed in Kandy for about a week.

Police raided the Mahason Balakaya office at Naththaranpotha in Kundasale after interrogating Amith Weerasinghe which revealed bottles used to make petrol bombs as well as equipment and propaganda materials such as leaflets, posters, notices, letters, banners, a large number of documents and wristbands, which were used in propagating hate speech. Further, the police found computer central processing units (CPUs), several bank accounts, bank slips and several vehicle permits.

=== Paranoia over 'sterilization pills' ===
Obstetricians and gynaecologists denied that pills can cause permanent sterility and stressed the need for surgical procedures such as vasectomy on males and tubal ligation surgery on females to cause permanent sterility. Director General of Health Services Dr. Anil Jasinghe also released a statement denying the existence of a method to sterilize a person through pills. Sri Lankan lecturer Dr. Mohamed Najimudeen from Melaka Manipal Medical College in Malaysia has also offered a prize of 1,000,000 LKR to anyone able to prove sterilization medicines are being added to clothes or food in the country by various individuals. Health Minister Rajitha Senaratne also claimed that there are no such medicines ever discovered to sterilize a male.

Dr. Razia Pendse, the World Health Organization representative in Sri Lanka issued a statement claiming, "There is no medication or 'pills' currently known or available that can permanently make a human being sterile. The information on the use of an 'infertility pill' or 'sterilization pill' mixed with food is baseless with no scientific evidence". United Nations Population Fund Sri Lanka Representative Ritsu Nacken in her statement noted that the incidents show the lack of access to accurate reproductive health information in Sri Lanka.

Sociologists and senior lecturers at the University of Sri Jayewardenepura's Department of Sociology and Anthropology, Dr. Praneeth Abeysundara and B.A. Tennyson Perera, called for authorities and media to create awareness and dialogue among community leaders and clerics to counter such paranoia.

On 8 March, the Department of Government Analyst confirmed the contents of particles alleged to be infertility/sterilization tablets were carbohydrate-based clumps of flour.

=== Kandy District ===
The government urged citizens to remain calm on 5 March, while the Ministry of Education ordered the closure of schools in the Kandy District. It also imposed a State of Emergency (the first since 2011) over the country on 6 March for 10 days, granting the state powers to arrest and detain suspects indefinitely and deploy armed forces at its will. The Criminal Investigation Department (CID) was tasked with an investigation into the event and its background.

The police came under heavy criticism for its failure to impose order and its alleged hesitation in preventing property damage at the start of the riots. Several government and opposition MPs criticized the police and its decision-making, while others called for calm and harsh punishments for perpetrators of racially motivated violence. A group of Sinhalese Buddhists and Buddhist clergy held a protest outside the Digana police station on 6 March demanding the release of all suspects arrested for their involvement in the riots. The government and the opposition party Janatha Vimukthi Peramuna (JVP) alleged an organized, political effort to inflame sectarian tensions in Kandy. The Buddhist extremist group Bodu Bala Sena (BBS) which was at the center of the 2014 riots, accused the public of unfairly linking it to incidents of communal violence in the country as BBS was earlier accused and criticized by the critics and other political leaders for aggravating the violence between Muslims and Buddhists. It was later revealed that BBS was unnecessarily blamed for the incident. BBS Secretary General Galagoda Aththe Gnanasara visited the assault victim's home on 4 March and claimed he had urged residents of the area to remain calm.

To prevent mobs from organizing online through social media platforms, internet access to the Kandy District was restricted by order of the Telecommunications Regulatory Commission of Sri Lanka (TRCSL). Access to Facebook was blocked, and the Ministry of Defence instructed the TRCSL to report on individuals spreading hate speech on social media platforms. The Centre for Policy Alternatives, a think-tank based in Colombo, released a statement claiming videos containing "false information" that sought to incite sectarian violence were going viral online.

Following the violence in Kandy, several foreign tourists cancelled their visits to the historic Kandy town. This was evident despite the attempts taken by the Sri Lanka Tourism Development Authority (SLTDA) to provide further updates to foreign tourists about the country's current situation. But the SLTDA stated that Kandy was returning to normalcy and tourists could resume their visits to the country.

The riots affected both Sinhalese and Muslim communities in the areas with businesses run by Sinhalese in properties rented from Muslims also burned by the mobs. After the riots ended citizens of Balagalla joined to help the Muslims affected by the riots. Pathadumbara Thalpotha Dhammajothi Thera, the Chief Incumbent of the Balagolla Viharaya organized efforts to provide dry rations to Muslim families displaced due to riots. Many Buddhist monks also visited mosques during the Friday prayers on 9 March to express solidarity with Muslims. An organization, Citizens Against Racism staged a peaceful protest on 8 March 2018 against ethnic minority violence in the country. Hundreds of Buddhist monks from the National Bhikku Front also launched a peaceful protest in Colombo accusing the rioters of destroying national unity.

In addition, Sinhalese and Buddhist volunteers actively participated in reconstruction efforts and one Muslim-owned eatery which was set ablaze by rioters was repaired by over 300 volunteers with around 200 being Sinhalese within 12 hours after attracting media attention.

The schools in the administrative Kandy District were re-opened on 12 March 2018 following the gradual improvement in Kandy after the communal violence. The schools had been closed for about one week since 5 March 2018 due to the imposition of the state of emergency.

International response

Australia, Denmark, Norway, the United Kingdom and the United States issued travel advisories warning their citizens to remain vigilant, avoid large crowds and protests, and follow instructions from local authorities.

- Turkey: The Turkish Ministry of Foreign Affairs released a statement that expressed concerns over the violence, saying "The Sri Lankan government will take the necessary steps to ensure that different religious and ethnic communities continue to live together in peace across the country." The ministry also offered condolences to the families of victims killed in the riots.
- United Nations: The UN condemned the attacks, calling for a quick resolution of the situation in a statement released on 7 March. "The United Nations urges authorities to take immediate action against perpetrators and to ensure that appropriate measures are swiftly taken to restore normalcy in affected areas". UN spokesperson Stephane Dujarric said, "We are obviously concerned over reports of the ongoing communal violence and we welcome the government's commitment to addressing the tensions and achieve reconciliation. We urge all Sri Lankans to resolve their difference through dialogue."
- United States: The administration urged the government of Sri Lanka to act quickly against perpetrators of sectarian violence, in a statement released on 6 March. "Rule of law, human rights, and equality are essential for peaceful coexistence. It is important that the Government of Sri Lanka act quickly against perpetrators of sectarian violence, protect religious minorities and their places of worship, and conclude the State of Emergency swiftly, while protecting human rights and basic freedoms for all".
- European Union: In a statement made on 8 March, the EU urged the government to take urgent action against hate crimes. "The recent attacks on communities are very worrying. It is important that the Government and the security forces take urgent action against hate crimes and ensure that the perpetrators of such actions are swiftly brought to justice. It is vital that all political leaders, religious and other community leaders condemn violence and make every effort to promote understanding and harmony between communities. The EU trusts that any actions taken under the State of Emergency will be proportionate and respect constitutional rights and freedoms".
- Canada: The Government of Canada called on the Sri Lankan Government to ensure the safety and security of all minorities. "Canada welcomes the Government of Sri Lanka's condemnation of the violent acts. Canada calls on the government to ensure the safety and security of all minorities, to protect human rights and fundamental freedoms for all and to hold those responsible for the violence accountable. As we said at the United Nations Human Rights Council last month, frustrations persist among those trying to heal the wounds of Sri Lanka's civil war. Ensuring that diversity and pluralism are valued is critical to the work of reconciliation in Sri Lanka".
- China: The Government of China stated on 8 March that it believes the Government of Sri Lanka and its people are capable of handling the current situation. "We have noted relevant reports. This belongs to Sri Lanka's internal affairs. China believes that the Sri Lankan government and its people are capable of handling the current situation, and upholding Sri Lanka's social stability and ethnic solidarity. We also hope that Sri Lanka will take concrete measures to protect the security of Chinese citizens in Sri Lanka".

Celebrity response

Sri Lankan cricketers including Kumar Sangakkara, Mahela Jayawardene and Sanath Jayasuriya strongly condemned the situation and asked the populace to come together to unite the country. Former Sri Lankan cricketer Muttiah Muralitharan said that his family members were feeling safe in Kandy and also said that there was no need to worry about the country following the declaration of the state of emergency.

Former Sri Lankan president, Mahinda Rajapaksa accused and blamed the government for not acting more responsively to control the ethnic riots. He further mentioned that some cabinet ministers tried to blame the police officials rather than being responsible to control and manage the unusual situation which has spread in the nation. Further, Mahinda Rajapaksa has also been reported to have met the heads of diplomatic missions of a few Islamic countries to discuss the communal violence which erupted in the nation a few weeks ago. He also visited Kandy on 9 March 2018 to discuss the current situation in the area following the violence.

Indian test cricketer, Ravichandran Ashwin also expressed his condolences towards the people of Sri Lanka and pointed out that Sri Lankan people are in general good. Human rights activist, Meenakshi Ganguly from India also blamed the Sri Lankan government for not taking immediate action to eradicate communal violence in the nation.

== Economic impact ==
The riots negatively impacted the economy of Sri Lanka as well as the local economy of Kandy. In addition to the destruction of many shops employing both Sinhalese and Muslims, many tourists cancelled visits to Sri Lanka which heavily depends on the tourism industry.

The violence in Kandy affected the Nuwara Eliya season in April where there was a 40% drop in tourist arrivals both local and foreign compared to the previous year. Tourism Development Minister John Amaratunga planned to invite Ambassadors of various countries that imposed travel advisories with a site visit for diplomats mainly from the European and Middle Eastern nations from 13–14 May with cultural events and tours to assure them about the country returning to normalcy.

== Other events ==
- The opening match of the 2018 Nidahas Trophy, a tri-series cricket tournament between Sri Lanka and India was held under tight security coinciding with the tense situation in the nation following the declaration of the state of emergency.
- Despite the violence between Muslims and Buddhists on the island, the funeral of Daranagama Kusaladhamma Thero was held on 8 March 2018 in Colombo.
