= Maheepala Herath =

Sri Lankan politician

Hon. Maheepala Herath
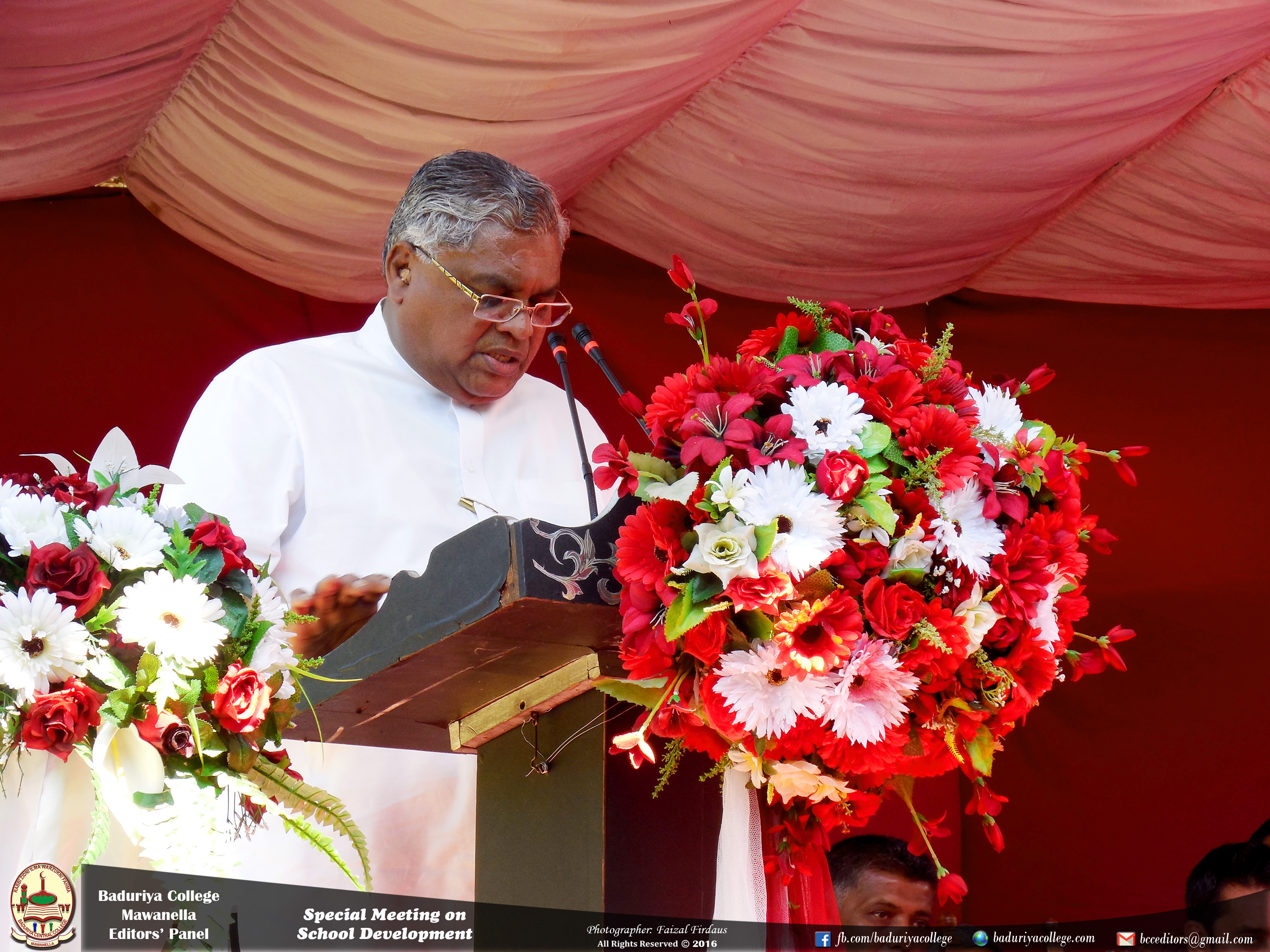

12th Governor of the North Central Province
- In office 23 March 2020 – 23 September 2024
- President: Gotabaya Rajapaksa; Ranil Wickremesinghe
- Preceded by: Tissa Vitharana
- Succeeded by: Wasantha Kumara Wimalasiri

8th Chief Minister of Sabaragamuwa
- In office 16 July 2004 – 26 September 2017
- Preceded by: Mohan Saliya Ellawala

Personal details
- Born: Sri Lanka
- Party: Sri Lanka Freedom Party
- Other political affiliations: United People's Freedom Alliance (until 2019)

Maheepala Herath is a Sri Lankan politician. He was the Governor of the North Central Province and the former Chief Minister of Sabaragamuwa Province of Sri Lanka. He belongs to the Sri Lanka Freedom Party and the United People's Freedom Alliance.
