= Karaliyadda =

Karalliyadda කරල්ලියද්ද கரல்லியத்த
- Town
- Motto: From good governance to prosperity (ඓතිහාසික මැදදුම්බර යහපාලනයෙන් සෞභාග්‍යය කරා..)
- Location within Sri Lanka
- Coordinates: 7°18′34″N 80°45′54″E
- country: Sri Lanka
- Province: Central Province
- District: Kandy District

Government
  - Type: Local
- Elevation: 1,562 ft (476 m)
- Time zone: UTC+5:30 (Sri Lanka Standard Time)
- Postal code: 20900
- Area code: (081)

Karaliyadda is a town in Sri Lanka's Central Province.

The town is located in the Kandy District. It is 22 km (14 mi) away from Kandy and 138 km (86 mi) from Colombo, at a height of 476 m (1,562 ft) above sea level. It is located near by the Victoria Reservoir.

== See also ==
- List of towns in Central Province, Sri Lanka
