= Balagolla =

Balagolla බලගොල්ල
- Village
- Country: Sri Lanka
- Province: Central Province
- District: Kandy
- Time zone: UTC+5:30 (Sri Lanka Standard Time)

Balagolla (Sinhala: බලගොල්ල, romanized: Balagolla, Tamil: பலகொல்ல, romanized: Palakolla) is a small village in Sri Lanka about 10 km (6.2 mi) away from the city of Kandy. Balagolla is located in Kandy District in Sri Lanka's Central Province.

== History ==
Originally, Balagolla area was a coffee and cocoa plantation in the times of British occupation in Kandy. As a result of the construction of Victoria Dam under Accelerated Mahaweli Development Programme (AMDP), displaced people of Teldeniya and Kundasale were settled in Balagolla area in the early 1980s.

== Establishment ==
This village was established in 1983 as a resettlement land for the families who lost their lands due to Mahaweli Development Scheme.

== Geography ==
Balagolla is located in Dumbara Valley of Sri Lanka. The Pallekele International Cricket Stadium is situated in Balagolla.

== See also ==
- List of towns in Central Province, Sri Lanka
- Sri Lankan Civil War
