= Qinghai (disambiguation) =

Qinghai is a province of the People's Republic of China.

Qinghai may also refer to:

- Qinghai Lake, China
- Qinghai Plateau, China

== See also ==
- Ching Hai, a Vietnamese spiritual leader
