= Ching Hai =

Vietnamese spiritual teacher

Supreme Master, Suma Ching Hai
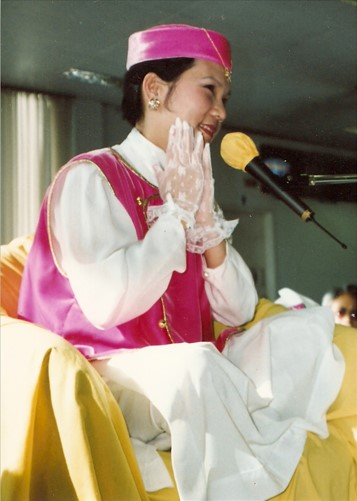
- Ching Hai in Sydney (1993)
- Born: Hue Dang Trinh; 12 May 1950 (age 76); Quang Ngai, French Indochina
- Known for: Spirituality, mysticism, poetry, entrepreneur
- Notable work: Book The Key of Immediate Enlightenment, Supreme Master Television, Loving Hut
- Movement: Quan Yin Method
- Website: godsdirectcontact.org

Supreme Master Ching Hai

Chinese name
- Traditional Chinese: 清海無上師
- Simplified Chinese: 清海无上师
- Literal meaning: Clear Ocean Immeasurable Teacher (Note: Qīnghǎi wú shàng shī.; Thanh Hải Vô Thượng Sư.; Literally; "Clear Ocean, Immeasurable Teacher". Winter, Franz (2018). "How to Download the Divine". Online – Heidelberg Journal of Religions on the Internet. 13: 133 – via Heidelberg University.: Both the Chinese and Vietnamese adjectives: "Immeasurable" are derived from the Sanskrit word "Anuttara" See: Glossary of Buddhism. For the Chinese title Teacher or Master see: Shifu.)
Transcriptions
Standard Mandarin
- Hanyu Pinyin: Qīng Hǎi Wú Shàng Shī

Vietnamese name
- Vietnamese alphabet: Thanh Hải Vô Thượng Sư

Ching Hai (born Trịnh Đăng Huệ; (Note: Vietnamese name consisting of three parts in the following order: a family name, a middle name and a given name.) 12 May 1950), commonly referred to as Suma or Supreme Master Ching Hai, is a British citizen of Vietnamese descent; a philanthropist, and the spiritual leader of the Guanyin Famen (Chinese) or Quan Yin method transnational cybersect. The practice had existed predating the common usage of the internet. Based out of Taiwan, she is estimated to have 2 million followers worldwide. Ching Hai founded the Loving Hut vegan restaurant chain and vegan Celestial Shop fashion company under Supreme Master Ching Hai International Association.

== Life and career ==
Ching Hai was born to a Vietnamese mother and an ethnic Chinese father, on 12 May 1950 in a small village in the Quảng Ngãi Province in Vietnam. At the age of 18, she moved to England to study and later to France and then Germany, where she worked for the Red Cross. In 1969, she began a relationship with a German scientist. They married, but separated after two years to focus on spiritualism and she moved to India to study different religions. In 1979, she met a Buddhist monk in Germany whom she followed for three years, but his monastery denied entry to women.

Ching Hai attempted to buy a copy of the Bhagavad Gita from a bookshop near the Ganges. Despite the shopkeepers' assertions that they did not have a copy, an extensive search revealed one in a sealed box. This led to rumours of her having a third eye circulating by 1982. In 1983, she met a Vietnamese Buddhist monk in Taiwan named Jing-Xing, who ordained her in 1984 as "Thanh Hai", meaning "pure ocean".

According to her official biography, Ching Hai was born to a well-off naturopathic family in Âu Lạc, Hanoi, Vietnam. Though raised as a Roman Catholic, she learned the basics of Buddhism from her grandmother. A Himalayas spiritual teacher showed her a particular meditation method which she named Quan Yin method.

According to Ting Jen-Chieh (Ding Renjie), assistant research fellow in the Institute of Ethnology, Academia Sinica, by the early 1990s Ching Hai was at odds with the Buddhist establishment in Taiwan. Rather than submit to their demands, she severed all connections to Buddhist organizations, abandoned the traditional robe, grew out her hair, dressed fashionably, and set out to create her own independent group.

Currently, Ching Hai does not operate under the guise of traditional Buddhism. Her home page calls her "Supreme Master Ching Hai, a renowned humanitarian, artist, and spiritual leader" (lingxiu daoshi 領袖道士). Her current irreverence for religious traditions in general, have made her more synonymous to a Zen master.

Ching Hai calls her meditation method the Guan Yin (Chinese) or Quan Yin method because she gave her first public teachings in Taiwan. Quan Yin is a Chinese term that means "observation of the inner vibration". Her meditation centres in American cities such as Los Angeles benefit from tax-exempt status as religious organizations. She presides over an organization which owns restaurants and sells her jewellery and clothes.

== Corporate operations ==
Ching Hai is the founder of the Loving Hut restaurant chain, which in 2017 had 200 locations in 35 countries worldwide. The restaurants are run on a franchise basis, with devotees managing each one and most workers belonging to the movement.

Her organization's numerous websites are offered in 17 languages. The Celestial Shop "includes a line of Celestial apparel and Celestial jewelry designed by the Master".

Liam D. Murphy, professor of anthropology at California State has stated that "Ching Hai is a textbook example of what social scientists call a charismatic prophet" and that the abuse of power over her own members in Loving Hut is a hypothetical possibility "If anyone is in danger...it is usually their own members". Murphy states that the proper term for her movement is not "cult," but more accurately a new religious movement". The Database of Religious History (University of British Columbia), states regarding Ching Hai's movement "Does the religious group actively proselytize and recruit new members: No." with subject-matter expert, anthropologist Stephen Christopher commentating "Not really. Of course Ching Hai herself uses 24 hour satellite TV programming to reach out to potential new recruits. It is more often the case that among the Five Precepts the edict of veganism is most actively promoted as lifestyle worth spreading among non-believers". Christopher writes "The debate about the legitimacy of Ching Hai largely plays out through cyber forums from YouTube videos to cult warning websites. Christian missionary groups are particularly interested in debunking Ching Hai even though they may have no direct contact with the organization. These online forums often devolve into misunderstanding and exaggeration and Ching Hai adherents often express hurt and disappointment when they discover such material. Conversely, some adherents have disaffiliated after encountering anti-Ching Hai material".

In 2017, Yahoo.com reported that Chuck McLean, senior research fellow at GuideStar, reviewed the 990s of two of the largest American chapters of the group: Los Angeles, which reports over $1.2 million in assets—more than any other chapter in the US—and San Jose, the parent organization of more than a dozen chapters across the country. "Taking their Forms 990 at face value, it seems unlikely that anyone is enriching themselves financially through these organizations ... I don't know what the associated business interests are about, but it appears that they give almost all of their money to legitimate causes."

=== International organizations ===
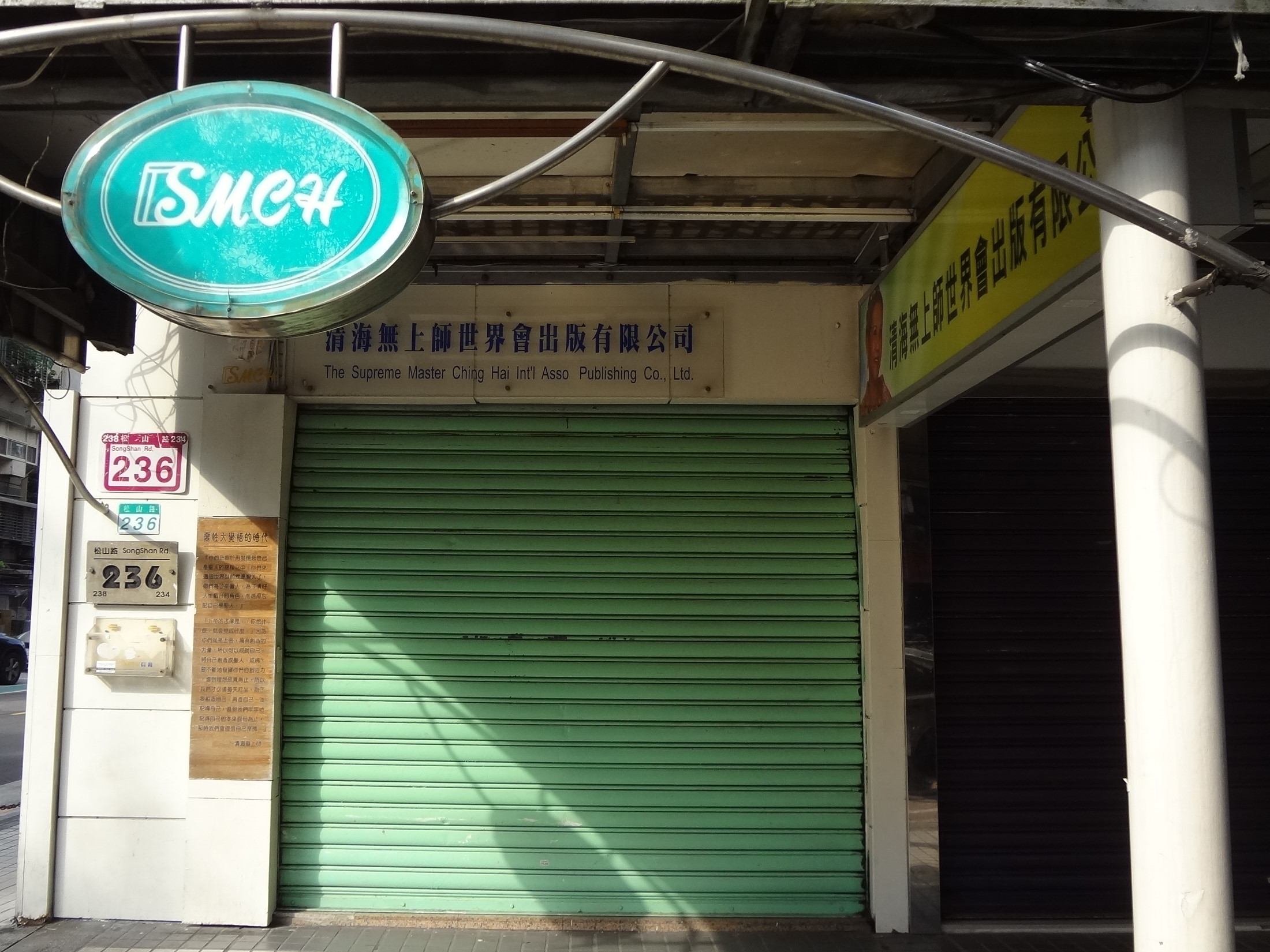
The Supreme Master Ching Hai International Association Publishing Co. was founded on 1st Fl., No.236, Songshan Rd., Xinyi District, Taipei, Taiwan.

Ching Hai has founded organizations including the Supreme Master Ching Hai International, World Peace Media, Oceans of Love Entertainment and Supreme Master Television.

In late 2008, Ching Hai launched a media campaign in Australia and New Zealand asking people to "Be Green, Go Veg, Save the Planet".

The Supreme Master Ching Hai International Association has made submissions to the Garnaut Climate Change Review, advocating large cuts to livestock production. Hai is in favor of a meat tax.

According to political scientist Patricia Thornton at the University of Oxford, the Ching Hai World Society's heavy reliance on the internet for text distribution, recruitment and information-sharing, marks the group as a transnational cybersect. Thornton claimed that the source of income behind Hai's numerous business ventures is unknown and that much of the media produced by her television programmes is heavily self-referential and promotional and aims to "build a public record of recognition for group activities."

Anthropologist Saskia Abrahms-Kavunenko at Max Weber Center for Advanced Cultural and Social Studies stated that similar to the Ravi Shankar movement, Ching Hai's group generally does not self identify as a religion and are very ecumenical. Abrahms-Kavunenko has also noted that while in the field in Mongolia, Hai's group especially via Supreme Master Television 24 hour broadcast is influencing many Buddhists ideas on meditation and enlightenment, even though they are not sure of the authenticity of her claims.

In Prominent Nuns: Influential Taiwanese Voices (CrossCurrents 2011), Religious studies Research associate Jennifer Eichman of the Centere of Buddhist Studies at SOAS University of London summarizes: While to some, Ching Hai's movement is considered Buddhist heresy and to others a New Age religious organization. Accusations of being a cult group have been made repeatedly over the years, especially in newspaper articles and by cult watchers. Ching Hai's response to this accusation is that participants were free to leave at any time.

In Eichman's own view, as infuriating as Hai's persona, her materialism and unsystematic religious synthesizing is to the Taiwanese Buddhist community and to others who have called her a cult leader, when her Buddhist roots are set aside and her work is compared to that of an ever-changing array of self-made gurus, spiritual guides and newly formed religions that make up the New Age marketplace, it becomes evident that Ching Hai's work is neither the most radical nor innovative. She states that the controversies swirling around Ching Hai should not stop us from noting just how gutsy it was for her to strike out on her own, and with her unusual prominence as a female spiritual leader, Ching Hai in effect demonstrates her ability to compete in a spiritual arena dominated largely by men. And we should be open to the idea that not all female leaders will remain within the religious mainstream.

== Humanitarian aid and philanthropy ==
A 1996 United States Senate Committee on Governmental Affairs report states "Published criticisms of Ching Hai generally fail to credit her organization's good works. Her members reportedly are active in many humanitarian and charitable causes...Ching Hai's greatest humanitarian activity continues to be working for the more than 20,000 Vietnamese refugees still in camps dispersed throughout Southeast Asia." The report also lists humanitarian aid to the victims of: 1991 eruption of Mount Pinatubo in the Philippines, the Great Flood of 1993 in the United States and the 1995 food shortage crisis in Cambodia. According to a report issued by the Information Centre for Human Rights and Democracy in Hong Kong: Prior to the 1997 Handover of Hong Kong, Hai donated 6 million dollars to Vietnamese refugees and other people who needed help.

Upon receiving the Gusi Peace Prize in 2006, Political journalist Fel Maragay wrote in the Manila Standard that while "to her disciples and admirers, she is a messenger from the world of spirituality who has set the directions their lives aright by teaching them "method of enlightenment" through meditation", to the people she provides humanitarian assistance; "she is a good Samaritan who has come to their succor during times of natural calamities. She has always carried out her charitable mission without fanfare in any country hit by major disasters.".

ReliefWeb cites Hai Humanitarian aid to the victims of 1996 Bangladesh tornado, the 2009 Namibia floods, the 2015 European migrant crisis via the Croatian Red Cross and in 2017 to South Sudanese refugees via the Sudanese Red Crescent. Humanitarian aid has also been reported in local news outlets in Florida (USA) during Hurricane Ian, 2011 flood victims in Belize 2018 Northern Province floods in Sri Lanka, 2020 COVID-19 support for Ghana Red Cross Society, 2022 Assam floods in India. In Taiwan, Hai has been active in Homeless street outreach. In 2018 Lu Wei-Ching, deputy mayor of New Taipei City stated that "the Supreme Master Ching Hai International Association has always paid attention to the disadvantaged, and usually donates all kinds of clothes and shoes to the homeless.".

Hai has created a series of awards under the umbrella title "World Shining Awards", "...to recognize some of the most exemplary, generous, caring, and courageous people who walk amongst us and go beyond the call of duty to help others unconditionally". A representative of Hai Association stated to The Washington Post that "An association committee selects individuals and organizations for donations based on their efforts to help others....Hai provides the money for the awards from the proceeds of her businesses, which include jewelry, clothing and vegetarian restaurants".

Award recipients included organizations such as the Department of Environmental Affairs (South Africa) of its efforts to protect Seals, the Iranian Red Crescent Society, for its humanitarian aid to victims of the 2008 Sichuan earthquake. and International Animal Rescue Indonesia for its work saving critically endangered orangutans in Borneo, protecting rainforest habitats and encouraging sustainable community development. Or to individuals, such as a young boy from Ohio who bought special harnesses to police dogs, a lady from India for inventing non violent silk saris.

== Quan Yin method ==
Ching Hai first demonstrated the "Immeasurable Light Meditation Center and the Way of Sound Contemplation" or Quan Yin method of meditation in Miaoli, Taiwan.

The method involves meditation on the "inner light and the inner sound" of God or the Buddha. Ching Hai claims that the Bible acknowledged the existence of this method: "In the beginning was the Word, and the Word was with God, and the Word was God." (John 1:1) and that this Word is the Inner Sound. Hai states that it has been repeatedly re-used by most major religions. As an example, in Buddhism, she refers to the Śūraṅgama Sūtra, where Avalokitesvara says that he attained enlightenment through concentration on the subtle inner sound, and then Buddha asserts "That is how enlightenment is won. Buddhas as many as the Ganges' sand entered this one gateway to Nirvana. All past Tathagatas have achieved this method. All Bodhisattvas now enter this perfection. All who practice in the future should rely on this Dharma.".

The Quan Yin method "Full Initiation" involves a life-long commitment to a vegan diet, adherence to the Five Precepts of Buddhism and at least two hours meditation daily. "Quick initiation" or "Convenient Method", requires a half hour's meditation daily and abstinence from meat for ten days each month.

A 2015 Immigration and Refugee Board of Canada Research report states "Sources characterize Guanyin Famen [Quan Yin] as a Buddhist group (Dui Hua Foundation 29 Aug. 2013; US 10 Oct. 2009, 115) or a "Taiwan-based sect" of Buddhism (ibid.)".

Thailand Mahidol University International College comparative religion studies syllabus classifies Hai's sect as a Religious movement within Mahayana Buddhism, alongside Thích Nhất Hạnh and Tzu Chi movements.

Transpersonal psychologist and Advaita Vedanta scholar Timothy Conway writes "While she was in deep spiritual retreat in the Indian Himalayas, under a very old teacher who evidently taught the way of Surat Sabda Yoga (as found in the Radhasoāmi tradition)", this final enlightenment evidently dawned. After her breakthrough, Ching Hai continued to practice deep meditation for many months, then went to Taiwan". Conway lists Hai in the "Women of Buddhism" section of his Narrative Encyclopedic Sourcebook "Women of Spirit: Saints, Teachers, Healers, Sisterhoods and Goddesses of East and West".

The World Religions and Spirituality Project has written "Ching Hai's teaching against violence towards animals is very similar to Sikhism, but her meditation teachings resemble Buddhism, and her Catholic background enables her to incorporate Christian Bible teachings as well.".

Religious studies scholar Jennifer Eichman notes that this particular meditation method is not part of the standard Buddhist repertoire. Hai's modified synthesis of the method is primarily in Christian-Buddhist jargon with a sprinkling of Hindu ideas. Ching Hai is more likely to cite the Bible than Hindu texts. Ching Hai claims, following standard Zen doctrine, that everyone is the Buddha; they simply need to realize this fact. In a departure from Christian doctrine, Ching Hai claims that God is not the creator of humans; rather karmic accumulation is responsible for the repeated transmigration of the soul.

Korean Dahnhak Qigong expert Kim Tae-young, author of the popular Leading Experience guidebooks (in Korean) — published in 102 volumes since 1990, has written in Leading Experience vol 37 (1997) that Quan Chi (concentrating on Chi) and Quan Nian, (observing conceptions) are more familiar terms than the term Quan Yin (observation of the inner vibration). Kim at that time; an initiate of Hai's "Convenient Method" explains "Quan Yin signifies the practice of observing sound in the literal sense. It is not the crude vibratory sound of matter we hear from the outside, but the deepest inner sound heard from the real self and the Truth". Regarding Hai's Master lineage, Kim stated: Ching Hai rarely speaks about her Master Khuda Ji.

In 1999, attending and reviewing Immediate Enlightenment, Eternal Liberation seminar In Ireland, part of Ching Hai's 1999 European Lecture Tour, Dominican Order priest Louis Hughes, chairperson of Dialogue Ireland a Christian countercult ministry, raises the question of the true origins of Ching Hai's teaching: "In a brief autobiography she [Hai] explains that her significant spiritual experience came about as a result of time spent in the Himalayas where she discovered 'the Quan Yin Method and the Divine Transmission'. Nowhere in the movement's literature is any mention made of how she came upon this enlightenment. Enquiring from one of her retinue as to who Ching Hai's teacher was, yielded the vague reply. 'Khuda Ji – he lives in a cave in the Himalayas – maybe has left his body now.' Such reticence in regards to the identity of one's initiating guru is quite unusual among Oriental religious teachers".

Religious studies scholars, Michael York and others, include Ching Hai in the Indian contemporary Sant Mat movements, where the method is called Surat Shabd Yoga. While adhering to formless devotion (Nirguna Brahman), the initiation of the method from a lineage guru or master is paramount. Professor of religious studies at the University of Lancaster Christopher Partridge wrote that Ching Hai visited India and was initiated by Thakar Singh, a Ruhani Satsang Sant Mat master. Investigator Terry Lenzner reported in the 1996 Committee on Governmental Affairs "Hue [Ching Hai] reportedly hid her association with Thakar Singh when she arrived in Taiwan in October 1983 because it would have prevented her from becoming fully ordained in the Buddhist order". Professor of philosophy David C. Lane, a controversial disciple of Charan Singh a Radha Soami Satsang Beas Sant Mat Master, stated in his 2017 essay "Studying Cults, A Forty-Year Reflection" that "Ching Hai, tried to deny for many years her close association with the notorious shabd yoga guru, Thakar Singh, since she didn't want to be tainted by her former guru's sexual exploits".

In an article titled "The Master from the Himalayan Cloud" published in Supreme Master Ching Hai News Magazine vol 79 (February 1997), Ching Hai stated while she did practice surat shabd yoga and attended different ashrams in the past, the master who gave her the final and breakthrough transmission was a master she called Khuda Ji, whom she encountered on a her spiritual journey in the Himalayas.

=== Ban in China ===
The Quan Yin method and Ching Hai's group is banned in China since 1995. In 1996, authorities discovered a list of several thousand practitioners. "Following an investigation into the sect, its beliefs, and activities, party authorities concluded that the organization was fundamentally anti-communist and labeled it a 'reactionary religious organization.'"

The Chinese government labeled the group as xiejiao, roughly translating to "evil cult" but clarified in 2000 as meaning any group that:

a. establishes an illegal organization in the name of religion, qigong, etc.;
b. deifies its leaders;
c. initiates and spreads superstitions and heterodox beliefs;
d. utilizes various means to fabricate and spread superstitions and heterodox [or cultic] beliefs to excite doubts and deceive the people, and recruit and control its members by various means;

e. engages in disturbing social order in an organized manner that brings injury to the lives and properties of the citizens.

Further, in 2017 the China Anti-Cult website listed Guanyin method as one of eleven "dangerous groups".

In 2002, the manager of the Wuhan Zhongzhi Electric Testing Equipment Company was accused by the Chinese authorities of using the business as a cover to "support heresies" associated with the Quan Yin method. The enterprise supported thirty practitioners who "masqueraded as employees and business associates." The manager was charged with using the company's offices and buildings as "retreat sites", organizing "initiations" and "screenings" to recruit members, and illegally printing and distributing more than 6,000 copies of heretical texts.

=== Ban in Vietnam ===
The Vietnamese Magazine's Religion Bulletin – January 2020, states "The Vietnamese government views all developing religions today as heresy". Methods of suppression: preventing proselytization, imprisoning proselytizers, forcing citizens to sign vows to abandon their religion.

According to an official statement by Vietnamese authorities:

"Activities spreading superstition affect the social fabric. They have the clearest and broadest influence on the population in places where these new religions (heresy, strange faiths) appear: Supreme Master Ching Hai, Long Hoa Maitreya, Treasured Temple of the Three Religions, Protestant Word of Life..."

A publication of the Central Propaganda Committee divided these "heretical religions" into three groups. The first two groups included religions that sprung up locally from Protestant foundations and Buddhist foundations. The third group contains those religions that were imported from overseas, such as Supreme Master Ching Hai.

== Controversies ==
In Uncompleted Transitional Justice in Taiwan: Repression of Religious and Spiritual Minorities and the Tai Ji Men Case, Associate professor of Business administration at Shih Chien University, Cheng-An Tsai wrote "After 1987 [in Taiwan], a post-authoritarian regime followed, which proclaimed religious liberty but still persecuted religious movements perceived as hostile to the ruling party. In 1996, after the first direct presidential election, the Taiwanese government launched a political purge, targeting religious and spiritual groups that did not show support for the president in power during the election. The crackdown hit several of the largest religious movements active in Taiwan, including Fo Guang Shan, Chung Tai Shan, Tai Ji Men, the Taiwan Zen Buddhist Association, the Sung Chi-Li Miracle Association, and later Guanyin Famen [Ching Hai Association]". Cheng-An Tsai added " Liao Zheng-Hao Minister of Justice, actively carried out the "religious crackdown" to purge dissidents including: investigations, tax inspections by the National Taxation Bureau, assets seizure, demolitions of "illegal" structures, and exorbitant fines. This elaborate campaign required the mobilization of a large number of media, judicial organs, national tax authorities, and so on. Angry ex-members were encouraged to make vague accusations, each of which guaranteed a good three weeks of media headlines. The crackdown was supported by the media, most of which were not independent from the ruling politicians.". In 2019, speaking in a freedom of religion conference in Taiwan, Li Jianzhong Judge and president of the Shilin District court in Taipe, mentioned that the series of religious suppression incidents in 1996, of Song Qili, Miaotian, Taijimen, Supreme Master Ching Hai, and many other groups that have been targeted: Some lawsuits have been going on for more than 20 years. "They have been prosecuted for "fraud" related to criminal matters. After careful judicial trials, all of them were found not guilty". SET News reported that in 1996 Miaoli County government demolished an illegal building in Hai's meditation center and that it was searched by prosecutors and police on a large scale, but in the end she was not prosecuted due to insufficient evidence. ETtoday quoted Hai followers stating "Why did the investigation bureau spend so much manpower, but finally closed the case? because there was no victim".

In 1996 Hai's American followers donated $640,000 to Bill Clinton's Presidential Legal Defense Fund which the trust returned. Following the 1996 United States campaign finance controversy the fund took caution to what it deemed "suspicious" funding sources. Mark Csikszentmihalyi, Professor & Chair of International studies at UC, Berkeley wrote "Are donations from charismatic Buddhists one whit more threatening than those from Pat Robertson?" Csikszentmihalyi described the alleged controversy as scapegoating members of minority religious groups in order to divert attention from the real problem of money in politics.".

In 2003, park rangers discovered a man-made island and a 330-foot (100 m) long boardwalk that had been illegally constructed in Biscayne National Park in Florida from Ching Hai's property just inland of the shoreline. The estimated cost to remove the boardwalk, restore the damaged mangrove forest, and remove the several tons of limestone boulders from the environmentally sensitive seagrass bed, was US$1 million. Miami-Dade seized the property of Ching Hai, known locally under the pseudonym Celestia De Lamour, to help recover the costs of restoration. The following year, park workers demolished the boardwalk and replanted between 400 and 500 mangrove trees in the area. The artificial island of boulders remained due to lack of funding to hire a barge, which would cost several hundred thousand dollars. According to the Miami Herald, "Federal agencies still hope to recoup costs from the landowner, but investigators say she and her workers have left the country." Removing mangroves without a permit is prohibited in Florida and carries a fine. Conversely, in 2010, when the Woodland Trust received a £100,000 donation from Hai's foundation in order to conserve an area of Snowdonia woodland in Wales, and was challenged about the Florida Mangroves incident and criticism, Woodland Trust Spokesperson stated "...the Woodland Trust has procedures to rigorously check out all high value donations against key criteria pertaining to legality and Trust policy." and that "the Trust always investigated corporate donors to safeguard its reputation. It found nothing untoward about Ching Hai, neither did the group request publicity."

She is a supporter of Donald Trump and claimed Trump was a "God-Chosen Leader of America and Bringer of World Peace". Hai supported overturning the results of the 2020 US election.

== Awards ==
- 1993 – Frank Fasi, mayor of Honolulu, presented Hai with honorary citizenship.
- 1994 – World Humanitarian Leadership Award, presented by Barbara Finch, chair of the International Federation for Human Rights.
- 1994 – World Spiritual Leadership Award, presented by General Secretary Chen Hung Kwang of the World Cultural Communication Association.
- 2006 – 27th Annual Telly Award Silver Winner for "The Peace Seeker" featuring Ching Hai's poetry.
- 2006 – Gusi Peace Prize, presented by President of the Philippines Gloria Macapagal Arroyo.

== In popular culture ==
Actress Joanna Ampil portrays Hai, in the 2011 Musical "The Real Love". The musical follows Hai life in Germany from when she met her husband (portrayed by Adam Pascal), and her decision to follow her spiritual quest.

== Bibliography ==
Series / Category	Title	Year	Ref.
The Key of Immediate Enlightenment	The Key of Immediate Enlightenment 1	1989	ISBN 9789866895432
The Key of Immediate Enlightenment	The Key of Immediate Enlightenment 2	1991	ISBN 9789866895111
The Key of Immediate Enlightenment	The Key of Immediate Enlightenment 3	1992	ISBN 9789866895449
The Key of Immediate Enlightenment	The Key of Immediate Enlightenment 4	1996	ISBN 9789866895180
The Key of Immediate Enlightenment	The Key of Immediate Enlightenment 5	1996	ISBN 9781886544550
The Key of Immediate Enlightenment	The Key of Immediate Enlightenment Questions & Answers 1	1993	ISBN 9789866895432
The Key of Immediate Enlightenment	The Key of Immediate Enlightenment Questions & Answers 2	2001	ISBN 9789866895333
Spiritual	Aphorisms I	1995	ISBN 9789866895364
Spiritual	I Have Come to Take You Home	1995	ISBN 9789868263505
Spiritual	Secrets to Effortless Spiritual Practice	2005	ISBN 9868106125
Spiritual	Of God and Humans—Insights from Bible Stories	2006	ISBN 9868106168
Spiritual	The Realization of Health-Returning to the Natural and Righteous Way of Living	2008	ISBN 9789868263536
Spiritual	Aphorisms II	2013	ISBN 9789866895654
Spiritual	Coloring Our Lives - Keys to Living a Beautiful Life	2015	ISBN 9789866895319
Spiritual	Love Is The Only Solution	2021	ISBN 9780578960067
Noble Animals	The Birds in My Life	2007	ISBN 9789866895142
Noble Animals	The Dogs in My Life, Vol 1	2007	ISBN 9789868536791
Noble Animals	The Dogs in My Life, Vol 2	2007	ISBN 9789866895081
Noble Animals	The Noble Wilds	2008	ISBN 9789868415232
Children	Master Tells Stories	1997	ISBN 9789868263567
Children	God Takes Care of Everything	2003	ISBN 9789866895340
Children	Your Halo Is Too Tight!	2005	ISBN 9572824562
Children	Mission on the Blue Water Planet (Digital)	2013	
Children	The Underground World of Mars (Digital)	2013	
Children	Sunny the Fearless (Digital)	2014	
Poetry	Silent Tears	1998	ISBN 9789866895043
Poetry	The Dream of A Butterfly	2000	ISBN 9781886544451
Poetry	The Lost Memories	2001	ISBN 9781886544321
Poetry	Traces of Previous Lives	2002	ISBN 9781886544383
Poetry	The Old Time	2003	ISBN 9781886544161
Poetry	Wu Tzu Poems	2005	ISBN 9572824597
Poetry	Pebbles and Gold	2006	ISBN 9789868263529
Poetry	The Love of Centuries	2011	ISBN 9789866895463

== See also ==
- Cybersectarianism
