= The Buddhist =

Buddhist television channel in Sri Lanka

- Country: Sri Lanka
- Broadcast area: Sri Lanka
- Headquarters: Sri Sambodhi Vihara (Sri Sambodhi Buddhist Monastery), Colombo

Programming
- Languages: English, Sinhala, Tamil

History
- Launched: 29 June 2007

Links
- Website: www.thebuddhist.tv

Availability

Terrestrial
- UHF (Colombo): Channel 53
- TV Lanka Digital TV: Channel 9

The Buddhist is the first Buddhist television channel for Sri Lanka. The Buddhist channel studios are located at Sri Sambodhi Vihara (Temple) that is situated in Colombo, Sri Lanka. It is available on the Sri Lankan Direct to Home satellite television services Dialog TV and Dish TV. The service also operates on PEO TV and cable TV. The aim of the channel is to telecast valuable religious and cultural programming in the three main languages of Sri Lanka, English, Sinhala and Tamil. The founder and the Chairman of the Buddhist TV is the most Ven. Daranagama Kusaladhamma Thero. On 29 June 2007, the channel was officially launched by President Mahinda Rajapaksa, Chief Justice Sarath N. Silva and head priest of the Asgiriya chapter in Sri Lanka.

== Buddhist Radio ==
Buddhist Radio is broadcast on FM MHz 101.3 101.5.

== Costs ==
Cost of channel establishment is 65 million Sri Lankan rupee (approx. US$600,000). The equipment and the channel was donated by the former Founder / CEO of CBN Sat (Dialog TV) Muhunthan Canagey.

== See also ==
- Daranagama Kusaladhamma Thero
- Global Buddhist Network
- Shraddha TV
- Lord Buddha TV
- Buddhist Publication Society & Pariyatti (bookstore)
- Buddhist Cultural Centre
- Access to Insight
