= Supreme Master Television =

Television channel

- Country: United States
- Broadcast area: Worldwide
- Headquarters: Los Angeles

Programming
- Language: Multiple

Ownership
- Parent: Supreme Master Ching Hai International Association

History
- Founder: Ching Hai

Links
- Webcast: suprememastertv.com/webtv/
- Website: suprememastertv.com

Availability

Terrestrial
- Cignal TV (Philippines): Channel 179 (planned)
- SkyTV (Metro Manila): Channel 19 (planned)

Supreme Master Television is a US-based satellite and internet television channel owned by the Supreme Master Ching Hai International Association (SMCHIA), broadcasting from Los Angeles. The linear channel started on September 7, 2006, with an interregnum between January 2, 2012 and October 1, 2017. Its programming is centered primarily on vegetarian and vegan principles according to Ching Hai's teachings. The channel features programs on spirituality, predictions regarding the end times and the return of God's Chosen Messenger, vegan cooking shows, and highlights damages and hurt caused by war and famine, it also includes SMCHIA's philanthropic efforts and recordings of the many spiritual lectures given over previous decades by Supreme Master Ching Hai herself. There is also a news program, Noteworthy News, with an emphasis on uplifting stories, especially from the animal world. SMTV also offered DVDs of its programming in Loving Hut restaurants, alongside its tabloid-influenced publications.

The channel employs multiple simultaneous subtitles, with most languages appearing horizontally and Chinese (Traditional and Simplified), Japanese, and Korean subtitles appearing vertically.

== History ==
Initially, its coverage area was limited to Europe, on the Hotbird satellite, uplinked by Deutsche Telekom subsidiary T-Systems. Starting November 16, 2007, it expanded its reach to ten further satellites, achieving worldwide coverage. RRsat was responsible for the uplink in six of these satellites. The channel was approved for carriage on cable operators in Taiwan on March 6, 2008. At the time, its operating capital was US$650,000. In late October 2008, the channel started broadcasting on Dutch cable operator REKAM.

British scriptwriter Robert Popper reviewed Supreme Master Television (which at the time was available on Sky) in a 2010 column for The Guardian, exploring the bizarre nature of the channel. Noteworthy News was seen as "the oddest of the odd", being presented by "semi-humanoid" anchormen. It was also the only news program to feature a joke of the day section, with the joke being delivered in one language.

Supreme Master Television suspended its operations on January 2, 2012. The channel remained on satellite for a while longer, showing a blank screen. One year after the dissolution of the original Supreme Master Television channel, the British holding company that carried the signal to the UK and Ireland, registered in 2007 by Vietnamese officials, was dissolved.

In 2019, its offer in Mongolia was influencing many Buddhists' ideas on meditation and enlightenment, even though they are not sure of the authenticity of her claims.

On November 11, 2024, Supreme Master TV introduced "Supreme Master TV Max", which displays a very large number of screens of Supreme Master TV. Supreme Master Ching Hai's disciples strongly believe that more screens can bring positive effects, such as miracles, world peace, and blessings.

Supreme Master TV now streams live on the web, YouTube, and across several other platforms, including in 2025 on shortwave via US radio station WRMI and others. On YouTube, Supreme Master TV also broadcasts 24/7 "SMTV Triple Compound Interest" (since December 3, 2024), "The Most Powerful Daily Prayer" (since January 27, 2025), and "Between Master and Disciples" (since January 31, 2025).

The channel is also carried on many Loving Hut vegan restaurants financed primarily by initiates/followers of Ching Hai, which is reportedly carried in all of its restaurants.
