= Loving Hut =

Chain of vegan restaurants

The Loving Hut International Co. Ltd
- Type: Private
- Industry: Restaurant
- Founder: Ching Hai
- Products: Vegan food
- Website: www.lovinghut.com

Loving Hut is a chain of vegan restaurants in which each restaurant is owned and operated independently and sets its own menu. There are locations in Africa, Asia, Europe, South America, North America, and Oceania. As of 2017, the chain had over 200 locations in 35 countries. Their slogan is "Be Vegan, Make Peace!"

The Loving Hut franchise has different service models ranging from fast food, fast casual to full service restaurants. While each restaurant has the freedom to create its own menu, the Taiwan Loving Hut headquarters published a guide: Criteria for Vegan Food at Loving Hut. The guide lists ingredients as "Vegan", "non Vegan" or "Avoid" citing health concerns. Among the ingredients to avoid are MSG and other glutamates, artificial food coloring, artificial sweeteners and genetically modified foods or ingredients. Alcohol is prohibited in food or drinks and all restaurants are smoke-free, with some restaurants serving non-alcoholic wine and beer. The headquarters and regional sub-offices provide various services for all restaurants regarding food import and export, recipes, personnel and training. The franchise has a factory in Taiwan producing its own varieties of vegan meat analogues, vegan dairy analogues, bulk foods, baked goods and seasonings (such as soy sauce) while encouraging restaurants to use local grown produce.

A significant part of the Loving Hut business model is targeting the market of flexitarians and meat eaters, which Loving Hut USA describes as being an "accessible starting point for those making the noble transition to a plant-based diet." This is implemented most notably by the convenience of the fast food model with emphasis on speed of service, affordability to the consumer, which is achieved by disintermediation (cutting out intermediaries) and familiarity: a vegan menu that also includes dishes with the taste, texture and names of non vegan familiar cuisine (fish & chips, chicken nuggets etc.).

The Loving Hut concept was created by Ching Hai, whose followers call her "Supreme Master".

Most restaurants broadcast "Supreme Master TV", a channel inspired by Master Ching Hai, in their dining areas, broadcasting "24 hours of positive news a day".

In 2011, the Phoenix New Times wrote that food critics, vegans and vegetarians mostly praised the quality of the food but also noted that "detractors depict the Loving Huts as a recruiting mechanism for a cult with a dictatorial leader who exploits her followers".

Liam D. Murphy, professor of anthropology at California State University, Sacramento, has stated that "Ching Hai is a textbook example of what social scientists call a charismatic prophet" and that the abuse of power over her own members in Loving Hut is a hypothetical possibility "If anyone is in danger...it is usually their own members". Murphy states that the proper term for her movement is not “cult,” but more accurately a new religious movement. The Database of Religious History (University of British Columbia), states regarding Ching Hai's movement "Does the religious group actively proselytize and recruit new members: No", with subject-matter expert, anthropologist Stephen Christopher commentating "Not really. Of course Ching Hai herself uses 24 hour satellite TV programming to reach out to potential new recruits. It is more often the case that among the Five Precepts the edict of veganism is most actively promoted as lifestyle worth spreading among non-believers". Christopher writes "The debate about the legitimacy of Ching Hai largely plays out through cyber forums from YouTube videos to cult warning websites. Christian missionary groups are particularly interested in debunking Ching Hai even though they may have no direct contact with the organization. These online forums often devolve into misunderstanding and exaggeration and Ching Hai adherents often express hurt and disappointment when they discover such material. Conversely, some adherents have disaffiliated after encountering anti-Ching Hai material".

In INFORM Minority Religions and Fraud: In Good Faith (2016), Marion Goldman, professor of sociology and religious studies at the University of Oregon, wrote "each restaurant is a franchise that devotees manage and most workers belong to Supreme Master burgeoning movement. They are efficient, courteous and eager to answer questions about their spiritual commitments. Like the earlier Mormon trading posts, Loving Hut represents both outreach and revenue. The employees are happy to Labour for love of their leader, their friends and the entire planet; so they often see their work as a kind of worship. The Loving Hut chain's success rests on each owner's financial and managerial skills."

== See also ==
- List of vegetarian and vegan restaurants
