= Kaduwela Bridge =

- Coordinates: 06°56′11″N 79°59′07″E
- Crosses: Kelani River
- Locale: Between Kaduwela and Bandarawatta

Characteristics
- Design: Beam bridge
- Total length: 100 m (330 ft)
- Towpaths: None
- Piers in water: 2

History
- Opened: 1982

Location
- Interactive map of Kaduwela Bridge

The Kaduwela Bridge is a beam bridge crossing the Kelani River between Kaduwela in the Colombo District, and Bandarawatta in the Gampaha District, of Sri Lanka. The bridge was constructed in 1982.

== Incidents ==
- In February 2019, the bridge was closed to facilitate repairs.
- In May 2018, one lane of the bridge was closed due to soil erosion affecting the bridges' stability.

== See also ==
- List of bridges in Sri Lanka
- 2018 Sri Lankan southwest monsoon floods
