= List of governors of North Central Province =

Governor of North Central Province
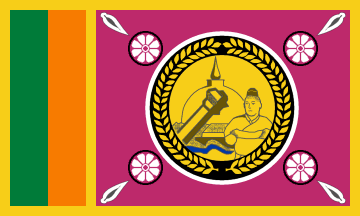
- Flag of North Central Province
- Incumbent; Wasantha Kumara Wimalasiri since 25 September 2024
- Appointer: President of Sri Lanka
- Term length: 5 years
- Inaugural holder: Dingiri Bandara Welagedara
- Formation: May 1988
- Website: nc.gov.lk

The governor of the North Central Province of Sri Lanka (Sinhala: උතුරු මැද පළාත් ආණ්ඩුකාරවරයා, romanized: Uthuru Mæda palāth āndukāravarayā) is responsible for the management of the North Central Provincial Council. Some of the office's key functions include exercising powers vested in the governor by the Provincial Council Act No. 42 of 1987 amended by Act No. 28 of 1990 and the 13th Amendment to the Constitution. The current governor is Wasantha Kumara Wimalasiri.

== Governors ==
Independent United National Party Sri Lanka Freedom Party Lanka Sama Samaja Party

| No. | Name | Portrait | Party | Took office | Left office | Refs |
|---|---|---|---|---|---|---|
| 1 | Dingiri Bandara Welagedara | | United National Party | May 1988 | May 1989 | |
| 2 | E. L. Senanayake | | United National Party | 11 May 1989 | 10 May 1994 | |
| 3 | E. L. B. Hurulle | | United National Party | 11 May 1994 | September 1994 | |
| 4 | Maithripala Senanayake | | Sri Lanka Freedom Party | 7 September 1994 | 12 July 1998 | |
| 5 | G. M. S. Samaraweera | | Sri Lanka Freedom Party | 1998 | 27 August 2003 | |
| 6 | Jagath Balasuriya | | Sri Lanka Freedom Party | 27 August 2003 | 13 November 2006 | |
| 7 | Karunarathna Divulgane | | Independent | 13 November 2006 | 27 January 2015 | |
| 8 | P. B. Dissanayake | | Sri Lanka Freedom Party | 27 January 2015 | 11 April 2018 | |
| 9 | M. P. Jayasinghe | | Sri Lanka Freedom Party | 12 April 2018 | 2 January 2019 | |
| 10 | Sarath Ekanayake | | Sri Lanka Freedom Party | 3 January 2019 | 3 December 2019 | |
| 11 | Tissa Vitharana | | Lanka Sama Samaja Party | 4 December 2019 | 23 March 2020 | |
| 10 | Maheepala Herath | | Sri Lanka Freedom Party | 23 March 2020 | 23 September 2024 | |
| 12 | Wasantha Kumara Wimalasiri | | Independent | 25 September 2024 | Incumbent | |

== See also ==
- Chief minister (Sri Lanka)
