= Tissa Vitharana =

Sri Lankan physician and politician (1934–2026)

Hon. Vidya Jyothi Tissa Vitharana
- තිස්ස විතාරණ திஸ்ஸ விதாரண

Governor of North Central Province
- In office December 2019 – 23 March 2020
- Preceded by: Sarath Ekanayake
- Succeeded by: Maheepala Herath

Minister of Science and Technology
- In office April 2004 – April 2010
- Succeeded by: Himself (as Minister of Technology and Research)

Minister of Technology and Research
- In office May 2010 – November 2010
- Preceded by: Himself (as Minister of Science and Technology)
- Succeeded by: Pavithra Devi Wanniarachchi

Senior Minister of Scientific Affairs
- In office November 2010 – 12 January 2015

Member of Parliament for National List
- In office 2020–2024
- In office 2004–2015

Personal details
- Born: 30 August 1934 Nuwara Eliya, British Ceylon
- Died: 13 February 2026 (aged 91) Sri Jayawardenepura Kotte, Sri Lanka
- Party: Lanka Sama Samaja Party
- Other political affiliations: Sri Lanka Podujana Peramuna
- Education: University of Ceylon; University of London
- Occupation: Physician

Vidya Jyothi Upali Tissa Vitharana (30 August 1934 – 13 February 2026) was a Sri Lankan physician and politician who was a Member of Parliament and a cabinet minister. He was the leader of the Lanka Sama Samaja Party (LSSP) and served as Governor of North Central Province from 2019 to 2020.

== Early life and family ==
Vitharana was born 30 August 1934 in Nuwara Eliya in central British Ceylon. He was the son of Pieris Vitharana, a Public Works Department engineer, and N. P. Maggie Perera, sister of N. M. Perera. He was educated at Trinity College, Kandy and Ananda College, Colombo. He played cricket for both schools. After school he joined the University of Ceylon's medical faculty in Colombo, graduating in 1959 with a MBBS degree. Vitharana captained the university's cricket team in 1957/58 and took part in the Sara Trophy Tournament.

== Career ==
After university, Vitharana worked as a medical officer (1959–67), and was registrar at Colombo General Hospital in 1963-64. His post-graduate work earned him an MD degree in clinical medicine from the University of Ceylon in 1965. He then went to study in the UK, obtaining a Diploma in Bacteriology from the London School of Hygiene & Tropical Medicine in 1968 and a Ph.D. in virology from the University of London in 1971. Specialising in bacteriology and virology, Vitharana joined the Medical Research Institute (MRI) in Colombo in 1972, serving as its director from 1983 to 1994. He was head of the virology department at the MRI from 1972 to 1994. Vitharana was a consultant virologist at the Edinburgh City Hospital's Regional Virus Laboratory in the 1980s. He was deputy director of the Victoria Infectious Diseases Reference Laboratory in Melbourne from 1991 to 1993.

=== Political career ===
Following retirement in 1994, Vitharana was a professor of microbiology at the University of Sri Jayewardenepura from 1995 to 2000, and an adviser to the Minister of Science and Technology from 1994 to 2001.

Vitharana joined the Lanka Sama Samaja Party (LSSP) in 1974. On 20 January 2004, the Sri Lanka Freedom Party (SLFP) and the Janatha Vimukthi Peramuna (JVP) formed the United People's Freedom Alliance (UPFA). The Communist Party of Sri Lanka CPSL and LSSP joined the UPFA in February 2004. Vitharana was appointed a UPFA National List MP in the Sri Lankan Parliament following the 2004 parliamentary election. He was appointed Minister of Science and Technology after the election.

Vitharana was re-appointed a UPFA National List MP following the 2010 parliamentary election. He lost his cabinet position after the election but shortly afterwards, in May 2010, he was appointed Minister of Technology and Research. He was promoted to Senior Minister of Scientific Affairs in November 2010. He lost his cabinet position following the 2015 presidential election.

At the 2015 parliamentary election, Vitharana was placed on the UPFA's list of National List candidates. However, after the election he was not appointed to the National List.

Vitharana was awarded the Vidya Jyothi title in 2017.

On 4 December 2019, Vitharana was appointed Governor of the North Central Province, Sri Lanka. He was sworn in before President Gotabaya Rajapaksa.

== Personal life and death ==
Vitharana was married to Kamini Meedeniya. The couple had one son, Ranil. Vitharana died following a prolonged illness at his home in Sri Jayawardenepura Kotte, Sri Lanka, on 13 February 2026, at the age of 91.
