= Udispattuwa =

- Village
- Location within Sri Lanka
- Coordinates: 7°21′18″N 80°50′15″E
- Country: Sri Lanka
- Province: Central Province
- Time zone: UTC+5:30 (SLT)

Udispattuwa is a village in Sri Lanka. It is located within Central Province.

== 2018 ethnic riots ==
The anti-Muslim riots between Buddhists and Muslims was held in 2018 started from the Udispattuwa area of the Kandy District. The communal violences caused several damages to the properties, lives of both Sinhalese Buddhists and Muslims in the area with a state of emergency being imposed in Sri Lanka for 10 days.

== See also ==
- List of towns in Central Province, Sri Lanka
