= P. B. Dissanayake =

Sri Lankan politician

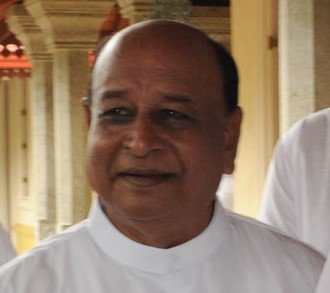
- Dissanayake in March 2015

12th Governor of Central Province
- In office 13 April 2018 – 31 December 2018
- President: Maithripala Sirisena
- Preceded by: Reginald Cooray
- Succeeded by: Maithri Gunaratne

Acting Governor of Uva Province
- In office 12 April 2018 – 11 May 2018
- President: Maithripala Sirisena
- Preceded by: M. P. Jayasinghe
- Succeeded by: Ariya Rekawa

8th Governor of North Central Province
- In office 27 January 2015 – 11 April 2018
- President: Maithripala Sirisena
- Preceded by: Karunarathne Diulgane
- Succeeded by: M. P. Jayasinghe

Personal details
- Party: Sri Lanka Freedom Party

Punchi Banda Dissanayake is a Sri Lankan politician who served as the 12th Governor of the Central Province from April to December 2018 and as the 8th Governor of the North Central Province from 2015 to 2018. He served as the acting Governor of the Uva Province for a month in 2018.

Political offices
Preceded by Reginald Cooray	Governor of Central Province; 2018	Succeeded by Maithri Gunaratne
Preceded by M. P. Jayasinghe	Governor of Uva (Acting); 2018	Succeeded by Ariya Rekawa
Preceded by Karunarathne Diulgane	Governor of North Central Province; 2015–2018	Succeeded by M. P. Jayasinghe
