= 2018 Sri Lankan southwest monsoon floods =

Natural disaster in Sri Lanka

2018 Sri Lanka floods
- Date: 19–26 May 2018
- Location: Sabaragamuwa Province Central Province Southern Province Western Province Northern Province Eastern Province
- Deaths: 22

2018 Sri Lanka floods and landslides caused from an annual heavy southwest monsoon beginning around 19 May. As of 26 May 2018; the monsoon floods affected in about 19 districts, killed at least 21 people, about 150, 000 people were affected and further left approximately 23 people missing. The death casualties were reported from 22 May onwards in the provinces including South, Northwest, North and East. About 4 people were reported dead due to lightning, 5 people were killed due to floods and lightning, 8 people died due to drowning and further left 4 people dead resulting from fallen trees. The DMC report claimed about 400, 000 people have been displaced to safer locations. About 105 houses were reported to have fully damaged and over 4832 houses have been partially damaged.

The red alert was issued to areas which are surrounded near rivers such as Kelani Ganga, Kalu Ganga, Gin Ganga and Nilwala River. Residents who were living surrounding the red alerted areas were forced to be evacuated by security personnel. The reports also stated that the rivers Kelani river and Kalu river have been overflowing due to heavy flash floods. Further the Meteorological Department of Sri Lanka predicted further rainfall in the coming days especially in the south and west parts of the country before the conclusion of the monsoon season. After the end of the monsoon period, few parts of the country including commercial capital Colombo received torrential rains.

== Causes ==
Typical progression of the monsoon across the Indian subcontinent. Sri Lanka is the island east of India's southern tip

The southwest monsoon typically peaks during late May to the beginning of June in Sri Lanka, with prevailing winds from the south and southwest, streaming toward the Bay of Bengal. The areas that usually receive the heaviest rain are the south and west of the country, including Kalutara, Ratnapura, and Colombo. May is generally considered as the wettest month of the year.

The 2017 Sri Lanka floods affected 15 districts, killed at least 208 people and left a further 78 people missing. 698, 289 people were affected, while 11, 056 houses were partially damaged and another 2 093 houses completely destroyed.

== Floods ==
The annual southwest monsoon rains started from May 19 and caused severe damages throughout the nation with heavy rainfall causing flash floods. The flooding severely affected Sri Lanka's Sabaragamuwa Province, Central Province, Northern Province, Southern Province and Western Province leaving 13 dead, 23 missing and about 125, 954 have been affected by the floods.

Gampaha was one of the worst affected areas with having about 42, 973 people affected and 33, 832 had been sheltered in the area. 28, 328 were affected in Ratnapura, the second most affected area in the island due to the prevailing weather conditions. Puttalam also was one of the hardly hit areas with Ratnapura as it received about 122.7mm rainfall on 23 May within 24 hours. The Ministry of Disaster Management revealed that Ja-Ela was overflowing due to the rise of water levels of Attanagalu Oya which is located in Attanagalla close to Ja-ela area. People living in low-lying areas near Ja-ela were earlier asked to displace to safer places.

The water levels of both Kelani river and Kalu river were assumed to be rising due to the heavy rain and leaving the Kaduwela Bridge to submerge. On 24 May 2018, the bridge which connects both Kaduwela and Biyagama which lie in the Western Province was officially announced to be closed for 7 hours from 10pm until 5am on 25 May due to soil erosion. The roads in low-lying areas Kaduwela, Biyagama and Malwana were flooded with temporary closure was determined for the particular roads. The people who were living along the river banks were warned to be evacuated following the rise of river water levels in the entire country. The spill gates of Deduru Oya and other tanks were also opened as a result of extreme weather conditions. Unnichchei tank in Batticaloa also reached spill levels.

Further landslide warnings were also issued to districts such as Colombo, Kegalle, Gampaha, Badulla, Kurunegala, Nuwara Eliya, Kalutara, Galle and Ratnapura as a result of the high rainfall. On 24 May, the Colombo-Hatton main road was blocked and disrupted due to landslides which caused traffic block in the main road.

== Health issues ==
=== Spread of virus flu ===
The deadly virus flu which mainly affects the children and infants (most common type of virus among babies) was spread in the Southern Province of Sri Lanka including Galle, Hambantota, Tissamaharama and Matara following the monsoon rain season which affected the Southern region of the country. The particular virus was considered to be an unidentified viral fever initially since its outbreak and was later described to be a pneumonia. Nearly, cases related to the viral fever were increased with 50 percent in Southern Province since the start of the monsoon season from May 19. 14 people including 11 children were killed due to pneumonia with about 400 patients being treated at hospitals in the South. The health authorities in the country also warned there would be an increased risk of viral flu in the southern part of the island due to the prevailing inclement weather situation. Some preschools in Galle, Matara, Tissamaharama and Hambantota were scheduled closed for a week since the virus outbreak during the early month of May. However, later the health authorities stated that the viral fever which prevailed in down south region was under controlled.

=== Spread of dengue, cholera ===
The Health Ministry of Sri Lanka warned people that diseases such as dengue, cholera, leptospirosis and other skin related disorders could spread in the areas affected by floods with flood waters receding in several districts after the end of monsoon period.

== Response ==
The Sri Lanka Navy deployed 38 officials to help the affected people due to flash floods. The Sri Lanka Navy launched operations to rescue the affected people who were caught trapped due to heavy torrential rains at their homes in the Pothuvil area. The army also joined hands with the Sri Lankan Navy with starting the evacuation process by sending more than 100 soldiers.

The National Disaster Relief Services also donated 12.7 million rupees to the affected 12 district secretaries in order to address the issues of the affected people.

== International response ==
Australia, UN - Australian government jointly with the UNICEF promised to raise funds as compensation during the monsoon period in Sri Lanka by signing a 3-year deal between 2018 and 2020 with the Sri Lankan government for AUD 750, 000.

China - China and Sri Lanka signed an agreement on constructing tunnels to prevent flooding situation in Colombo in the future following the deadly floods.
