= Gusi Peace Prize =

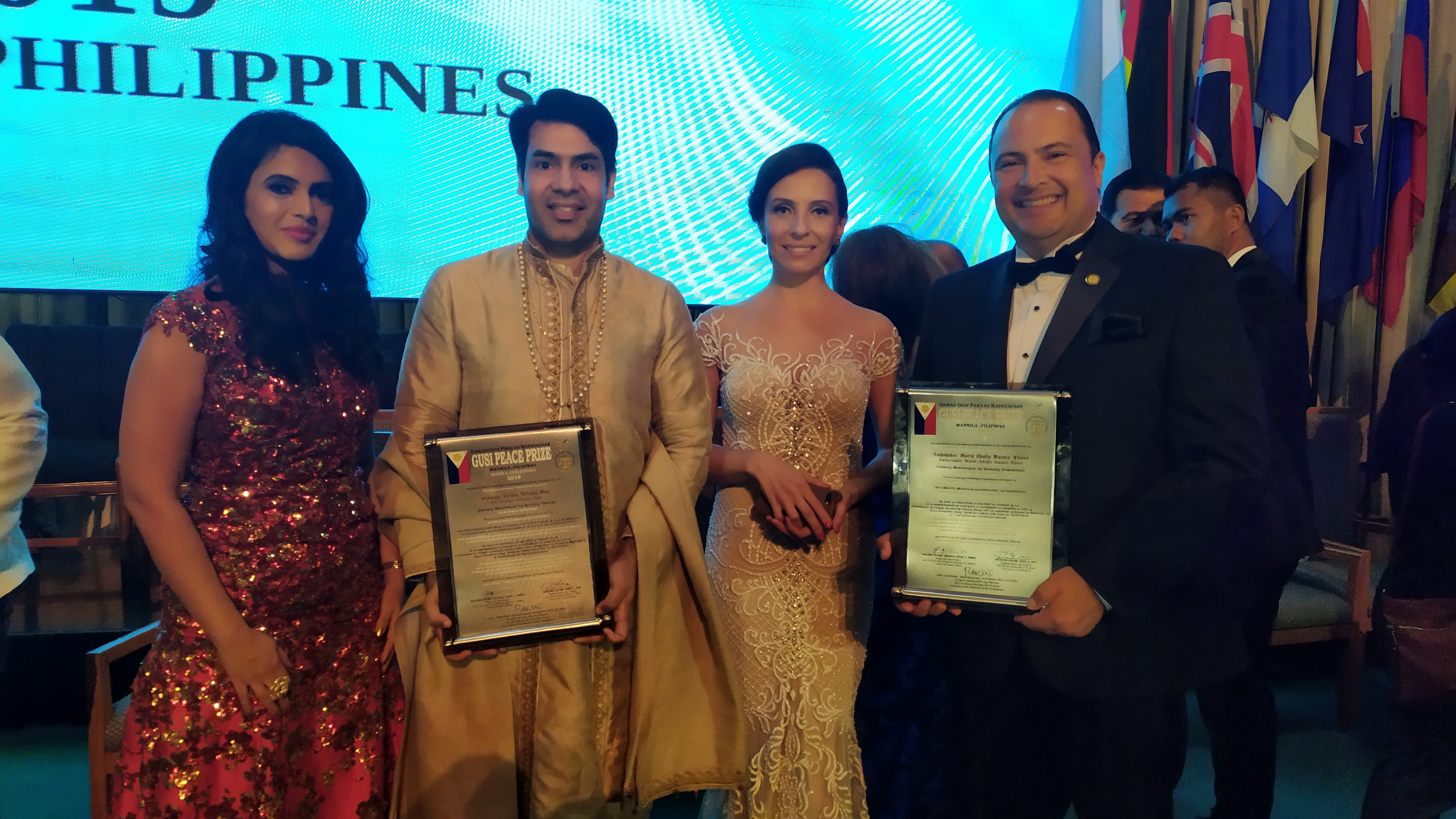
- 2019 awarding ceremony
- Awarded for: To honor contributions to global peace and progress
- Location: Pasay, Philippines
- Presented by: Gusi Peace Prize Foundation
- First award: 2002

The Gusi Peace Prize is a private award given by the Gusi Peace Prize Foundation, based in Manila, Philippines. The Gusi Peace Prize is given to recognize individuals and organizations who contribute to global peace and progress through a wide variety of fields. It is conferred with the expectation that a recipient will continue working for peace.

The awards ceremonies are held yearly at Philippine International Convention Center in Pasay in Metro Manila. on the fourth Wednesday of November.

== Background ==
=== History ===
This Gusi Peace Prize was founded by its now chairman, Barry Gusi in 2002. He established it to pay special tribute to Captain Geminiano Javier Gusi, a World War II guerrilla who subsequently became a politician and a human rights activist in the Philippines. His work was subsequently supported and continued by his wife, Teodora Sotejo Gusi, who established and moderated many charitable projects to help persons in need (including abused children and wives, sick and unemployed persons, humiliated individuals, etc.) throughout the Philippines.

=== Foundation ===
The Gusi Peace Prize Foundation is a charitable, nonprofit, secular organization registered with the Securities and Exchange Commission . The foundation recognizes the achievements of various individuals in a wide range of fields (including human rights, peace, communal harmony, health, education, culture, politics and humanity).

== Nomination process ==
Gusi Peace Prize Foundation receives more than 1,000 proposals every year, from which the 13-member committee (with international jurors from Asia, Europe, Australia and United States) selecting 15 winners. As per the award’s criteria, all proposed nominations should be endorsed by their relevant organizations or local ministries who can subsequently certify their nominees’ worth and achievements. The final list of winners also requires the approval of the Senate of the Philippines.

== Awards ceremony ==
The ceremony consists of several of pre-awarding sessions and post-awarding events for laureates, including a wreath-laying ceremony at Rizal Park, a visit to Manila City Hall for a ceremonial handover of the Golden Key of Manila by Mayor of Manila, a courtesy call to the President of the Philippines at Malacañang Palace, cultural music and dance performances, a press conference at the National Press Club in Manila, and a farewell programme in Tagaytay, Cavite, among others.

The final awards ceremony is held at Philippine International Convention Center on the fourth Wednesday of November. The average number of attendees of around 5,000, comprises representatives of the diplomatic corporations, local and foreign politicians, business leaders, celebrities, philanthropists, scientists and other prominent figures from the Philippines, Asia, and the rest of the world.

== Recognition by the Philippine government ==
The Gusi Peace Prize is referred to in Presidential Proclamation No. 1476 signed by President of the Philippines Gloria Macapagal Arroyo on 17 March 2008, declaring every fourth Wednesday of November as "Gusi Peace Prize International Friendship Day".

== Controversies ==
=== Personal appearance requirement ===
Politician and professional boxer Manny Pacquiao was shortlisted for the Prize in 2009, but was replaced with singer and actress Lea Salonga. According to the criteria of the Gusi Peace Prize Foundation, awardees must be present at the awards ceremony to personally receive the prize; instead of attending the event, Pacquiao designated his Canadian adviser, Michael Koncz, to receive the prize on his behalf. In following the “No Showing Up - No Award” policy, Gusi as chairman of the foundation not only revoked the nomination of Manny Pacquiao but also blacklisted him from all future awarding.

=== Barry Gusi's ambassadorship ===
Barry Gusi was scrutinized in 2011 for allegedly posing as a Philippine ambassador to both the Federated States of Micronesia and the Northern Marianas Islands. Article 177 of the Revised Penal Code of the Philippines, under “Usurpation of Authority or Official Functions”, penalizes individuals posing as government officials, officers, or representatives with imprisonment.

Gusi admitted to not being a diplomatic envoy under the Department of Foreign Affairs, clarifying he was an “honorary ambassador”. This was in response to the DFA issuing a statement that he was never a diplomat, after a company looking to sponsor the award conducted a verification process and subsequently dropped their bid. Gusi claimed he would not appear in DFA records as an “honorary ambassador” for the Northern Marianas by appointment of the territory’s governor and senate president, adding he held the post from 1996 to 1999.
