= Ariya Rekawa =

Sri Lankan politician (born 1941)

Ariya Bandara Rekawa (born 19 February 1941) is the 8th and current governor of Uva Province in Sri Lanka.

Rekawa was elected to parliament representing the United National Party in the Kurunegala electorate at the 9th parliamentary election, held on 15 February 1989. Rekawa served as the Deputy Chairman of Committees between 9 March 1989 and 24 June 1994.

He was the ambassador for Sri Lanka for the Philippines from 2001 to 2004.

On 11 May 2018 he was appointed as the Governor of Uva Province.

Political offices
Preceded by P. B. Dissanayake (as Acting Governor)	Governor of Uva; 2018	Succeeded by
