= Wasantha Kumara Wimalasiri =

Sri Lankan politician

Wasantha Kumara Wimalasiri is the current governor of the North Central Province of Sri Lanka.
