= M. P. Jayasinghe =

Sri Lankan politician (1944/1945–2026)

- එම්. පී. ජයසිංහ

9th Governor of North Central Province
- In office 12 April 2018 – 31 December 2018
- President: Maithripala Sirisena
- Preceded by: P. B. Dissanayake
- Succeeded by: Sarath Ekanayake

7th Governor of Uva Province
- In office 27 January 2015 – 11 April 2018
- President: Maithripala Sirisena
- Preceded by: Nanda Mathew
- Succeeded by: P. B. Dissanayake

Personal details
- Born: 1944 or 1945 Hambantota, British Ceylon
- Died: 13 May 2026 (aged 81)
- Party: Sri Lanka Freedom Party

Marappullige Jayasinghe (1944 or 1945 – 13 May 2026) was a Sri Lankan politician who was the 9th governor of the North Central Province. He previously served as the governor of the Uva Province.

Jayasinghe died on 13 May 2026, at the age of 81.

Political offices
Preceded by P. B. Dissanayake	Governor of North Central Province; 2018	Succeeded by Sarath Ekanayake
Preceded by Nanda Mathew	Governor of Uva; 2015–2018	Succeeded by P. B. Dissanayake (as Acting Governor)
