= 2018 Northern Province floods (Sri Lanka) =

Natural disaster in Sri Lanka

- Date: 22 December
- Location: Northern Province *Jaffna *Mannar *Mullaithivu *Vavuniya *Kilinochchi
- Deaths: 1

2018 Northern Province floods in Sri Lanka caused from heavy rainfall in five main districts of Northern Province including Jaffna, Mannar, Mullaithivu, Vavuniya and Kilinochchi beginning around 22 December 2018 on a full moon Poya Day. As of 22 December according to Disaster Management Centre (DMC), more than 45000 people from mere nearly 14000 families were reported to have been affected. According to the reports two casualties have been reported so far due to the flash floods. The floods receded in all 5 main districts of the Northern Province with significant damages to agricultural crops.

As of 25 December 2018 (eve of Christmas), over 75000 people have been affected by the torrential rainfall and flash floods in the Northern part of the island. More than 11000 people are staying in 35 evacuation centres.

The sluice gates of Iranamadu Tank were opened and the people near the Iranmadu area were safely evacuated. It was also revealed that the overflow of recently renovated Moragahakanda Dam which was reopened by President Maithripala Sirisena was also linked to the course of floods in the Northern Province.

== Background ==
Sri Lanka is reported to have been identified as the second most vulnerable nation in the world to confront climatic changes due to the effects of global warming. The floods caused in Northern Province is the second worst natural disaster to have occurred in Sri Lanka in the month of December, after the horrible tragic effect of the 2004 Indian Ocean earthquake and tsunami on Sri Lanka.
