= Daranagama Kusaladhamma Thera =

Sri Lankan monk (1963–2018)

Ven. Daranagama Kusaladhamma Thera
- දරණාගම කුසලධම්ම හිමි
- Title: Chief Incumbent of the Colombo Sri Sambodhi Viharaya

Personal life
- Born: 29 July 1963 Daranagama, Makola, Sri Lanka
- Died: 3 March 2018 (aged 54)
- Education: University of Kelaniya

Religious life
- Religion: Buddhism
- School: Theravada
- Dharma names: Ven. Daranagama Kusaladhamma Thera

Daranagama Kusaladhamma Thera (29 July 1963 – 3 March 2018) (Sinhala: දරණාගම කුසලධම්ම හිමි) was a Sri Lankan Sinhalese Buddhist monk who founded the first Sri Lankan Buddhist media network and the television channel, The Buddhist. He served as the Chief Incumbent of the Colombo Sri Sambodhi Viharaya and the Sambodhi Community Development Foundation in London. He died on 3 March 2018 at the age of 54.

== Biography ==
Daranagama Kusaladhamma Thera was born on 29 July 1963 in Daranagama. He got the prefix name of "Daranagama" which was his birthplace. He educated at the Royal College, Colombo and received his master's degree at the University of Kelaniya.

== Buddhist TV network ==
He went onto launch The Buddhist media network on 15 May 2011 with The Buddhist radio transmission. Ven. Daranagama Kusaladhamma Thera was instrumental in launching Sri Lanka's first primary Buddhist channel in January 2012 under the title The Buddhist.

== Death ==
After suffering from illness, Daranagama Kusaladhamma Thera died on 3 March 2018 when he was 54 years old. His funeral took place at the Sports Ministry Ground at the Independence Square.

As a result of his death, the annual Big Match between Royal College and St. Thomas College, which is known as Royal–Thomian clash (Battle of the Blues), was postponed to 9 March 2018 as he was a past pupil of the Royal College.

== See also ==
- Buddhism in Sri Lanka
- The Buddhist
- Shraddha TV
- Global Buddhist Network
