= Victoria Dam (Sri Lanka) =

Victoria Dam වික්ටෝරියා වේල්ල
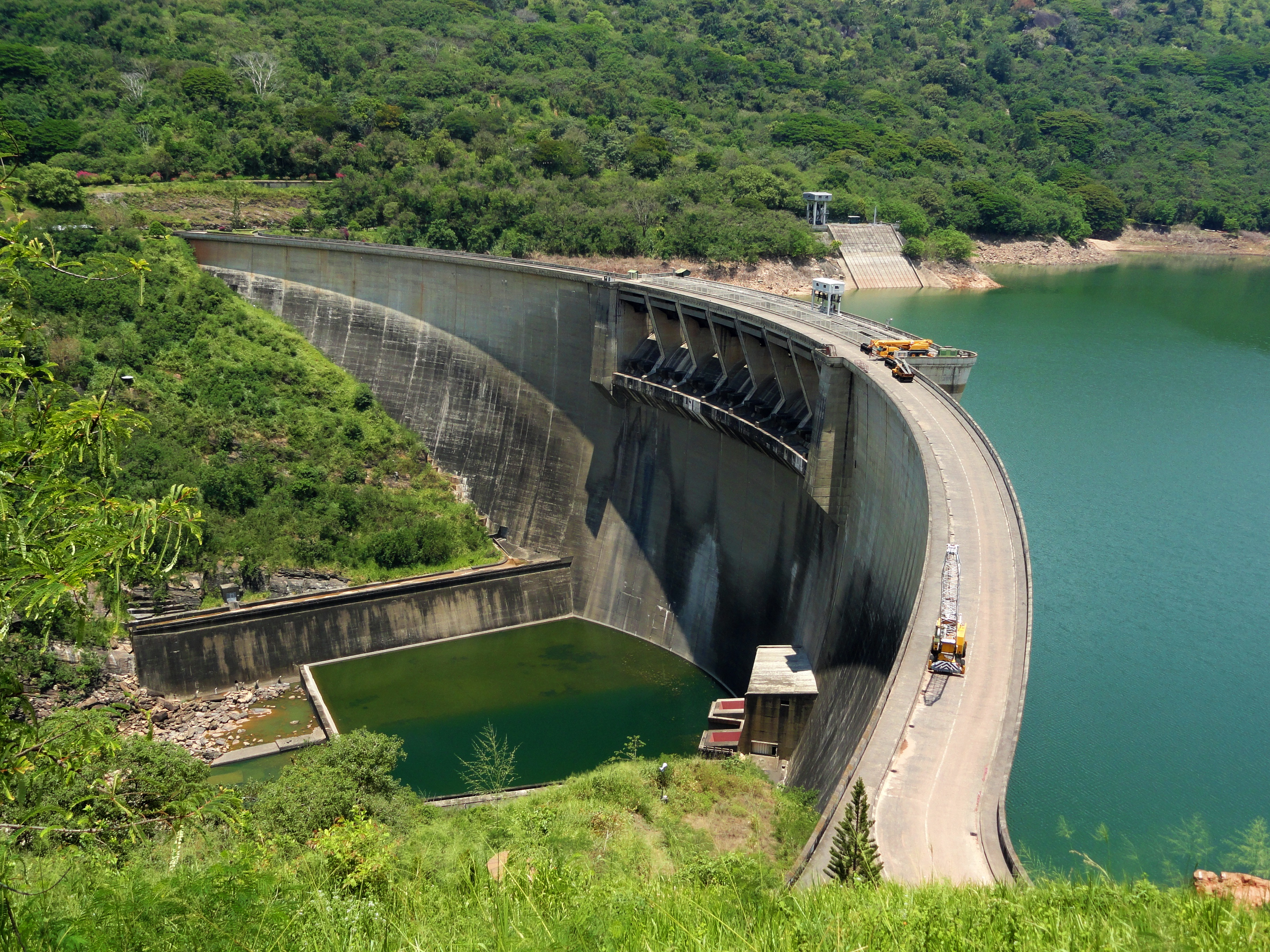
- The dam on 15 April 2011. Three days after its 26th anniversary of opening.

- Location within Sri Lanka
- Country: Sri Lanka
- Location: Teldeniya
- Coordinates: 07°14′29″N 80°47′05″E
- Purpose: Power
- Status: Operational
- Construction began: 14 August 1978; 48 years ago
- Opening date: 14 April 1985
- Owner: Mahaweli Authority

Dam and spillways
- Type of dam: Arch dam
- Impounds: Mahaweli River
- Height (foundation): 122 m (400 ft)
- Length: 520 m (1,706 ft)
- Width (base): 25 m (82 ft)
- Spillways: 8
- Spillway capacity: 8,200 m^{3}/s (289,580 cu ft/s)

Reservoir
- Creates: Victoria Reservoir
- Total capacity: 722,000,000 m^{3} (2.55×10^{10} ft^{3})
- Active capacity: 689,000,000 m^{3} (2.43×10^{10} ft^{3})
- Catchment area: 1,869 km^{2} (722 mi^{2})
- Surface area: 23 km^{2} (9 mi^{2})

Victoria Power Station
- Coordinates: 07°12′00″N 80°48′21″E
- Turbines: 3 × 70 MW
- Installed capacity: 210 MW
- Capacity factor: 42.4%
- Annual generation: 780 GWh

Victoria Dam (Sinhala: වික්ටෝරියා වේල්ල Viktoriya Vella, Tamil: விக்டோரியா நீர்த்தேக்கம்) is an arch dam located 130 mi (209 km) upstream of the Mahaweli River's mouth and 4 mi (6 km) from Teldeniya in Sri Lanka. It is named in honour of Queen Victoria of the United Kingdom.

Its main purposes are irrigation and hydroelectric power production. It is the tallest dam in Sri Lanka, and supports a 210 MW power station, the largest hydroelectric power station in the country. Construction of the dam commenced in 1978, funded by aid granted by the United Kingdom under the patronage of Queen Elizabeth II, was completed during the presidency of Junius Richard Jayewardene, and was ceremonially opened by the prime minister of the United Kingdom, Margaret Thatcher.

== History ==
The Victoria Dam was constructed under the Accelerated Mahaweli Development Programme (AMDP). The project had been in planning for 30 years but was accelerated in 1977 to address economic difficulties within the country. The plan is designed to irrigate 365,000 ha (901,935 acres) of land and provide 600 MW of electricity. The Victoria Dam was originally proposed in 1964 after studies were completed by Canada's Huntings Technical Services and a team from the United Nations Development Program—Food and Agriculture Organization (UNDP-FAO). Construction of the dam was inaugurated on 14 August 1978, by the then-President Jayewardene with the implementation of the main structures beginning in 1980. Its completion was marked by a ceremony on 12 April 1985. Construction of the dam and tunnel was completed by the British Joint Venture of Balfour Beatty and Edmund Nuttall, while Costain Group carried out the construction of the power station. The consultant engineers on the project was Sir Alexander Gibb & Partners. The dam project resettled about 30,000 people — four times the estimate.

== Dam and powerhouse ==
The dam measures 122 m (400 ft) tall, with a crest length of 520 m (1,706 ft), crest width of 6 m (20 ft), and a base width of 25 m (82 ft). The dam creates the Victoria Reservoir, which has a surface area of 22.7 km^{2} (8.8 mi^{2}), gross storage capacity of 722,000,000 m^{3} (2.55×10^{10} ft^{3}), and a catchment area of 1,869 km^{2} (722 mi^{2}).

Water from the dam is fed to the powerhouse at 07°12′00″N 80°48′21″E via a 5,646 m (18,524 ft) long tunnel, which houses three penstocks of 6.2 m (20.3 ft) diameter. These penstocks created a net head of 190 m (623 ft), feeding three 70 MW 12.5 kV turbines, which are capable of generating up to 780 GWh of electrical energy annually.

The dam consists of eight spillways, each with a width and height of 12.5 m (41 ft) and 6.5 m (21.3 ft), which automatically opens when water levels are high. The dam's gates, which need power only to close, won an award for "Innovative Design in Civil Engineering" by the Institution of Civil Engineers. The total effective width of the spillways is 100 m (328 ft), allowing a maximum discharge of 8,200 m^{3}/s (289,580 cu ft/s). Two additional low-level sluices at the base of the dam allows the purging of accumulated silts behind the dam.

== Gallery ==
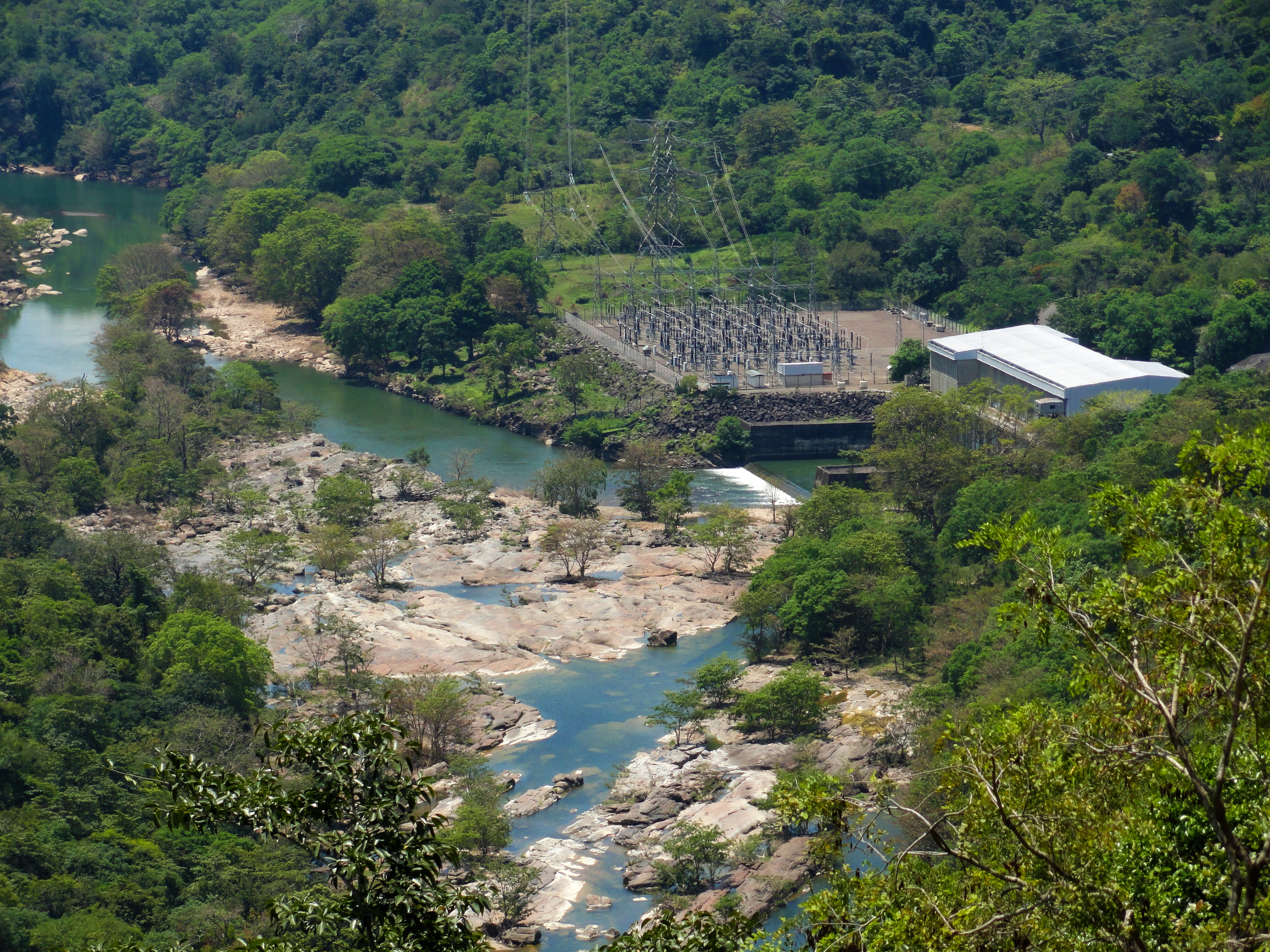
Power Station of Victoria Dam

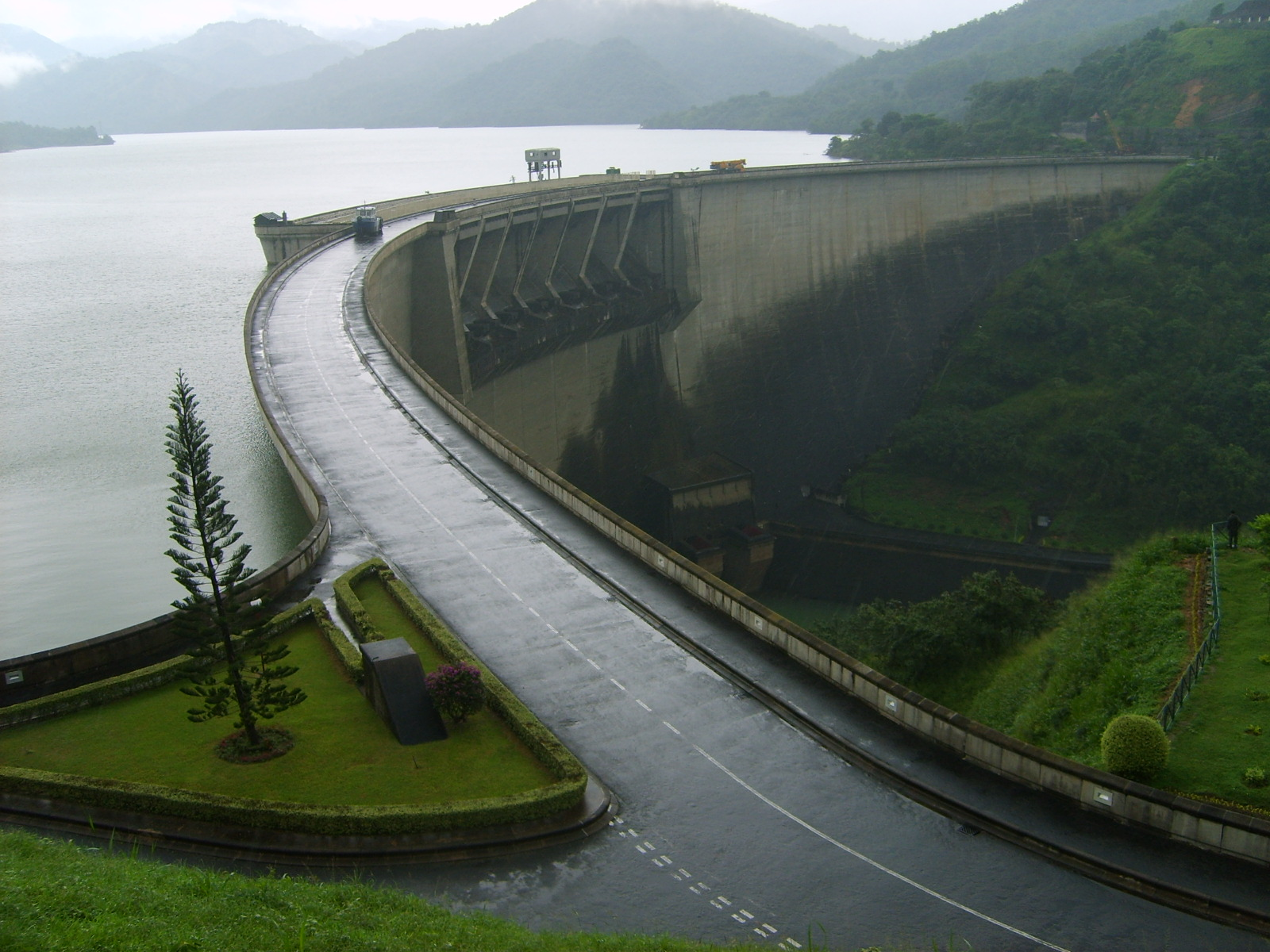
Victoria Dam

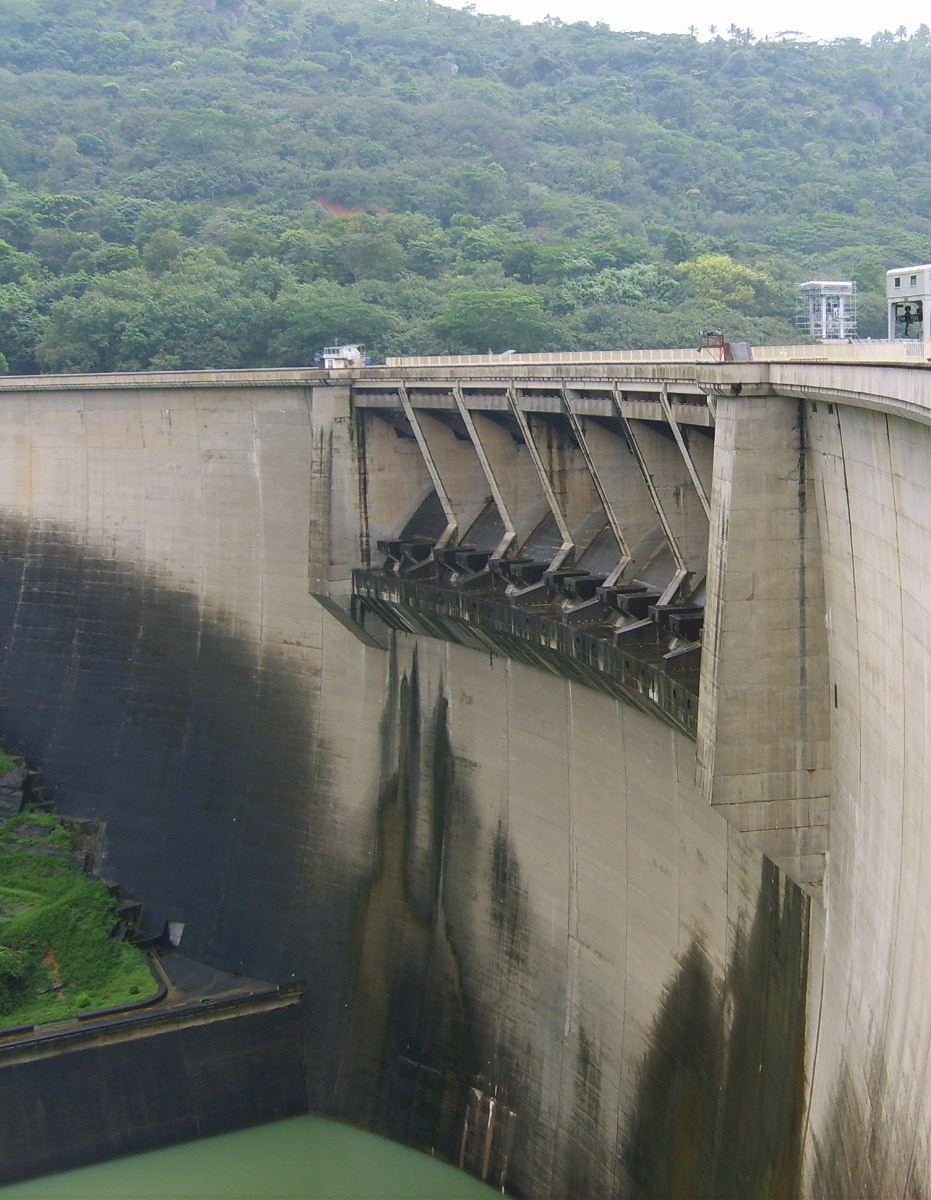
Victoria Dam from the top

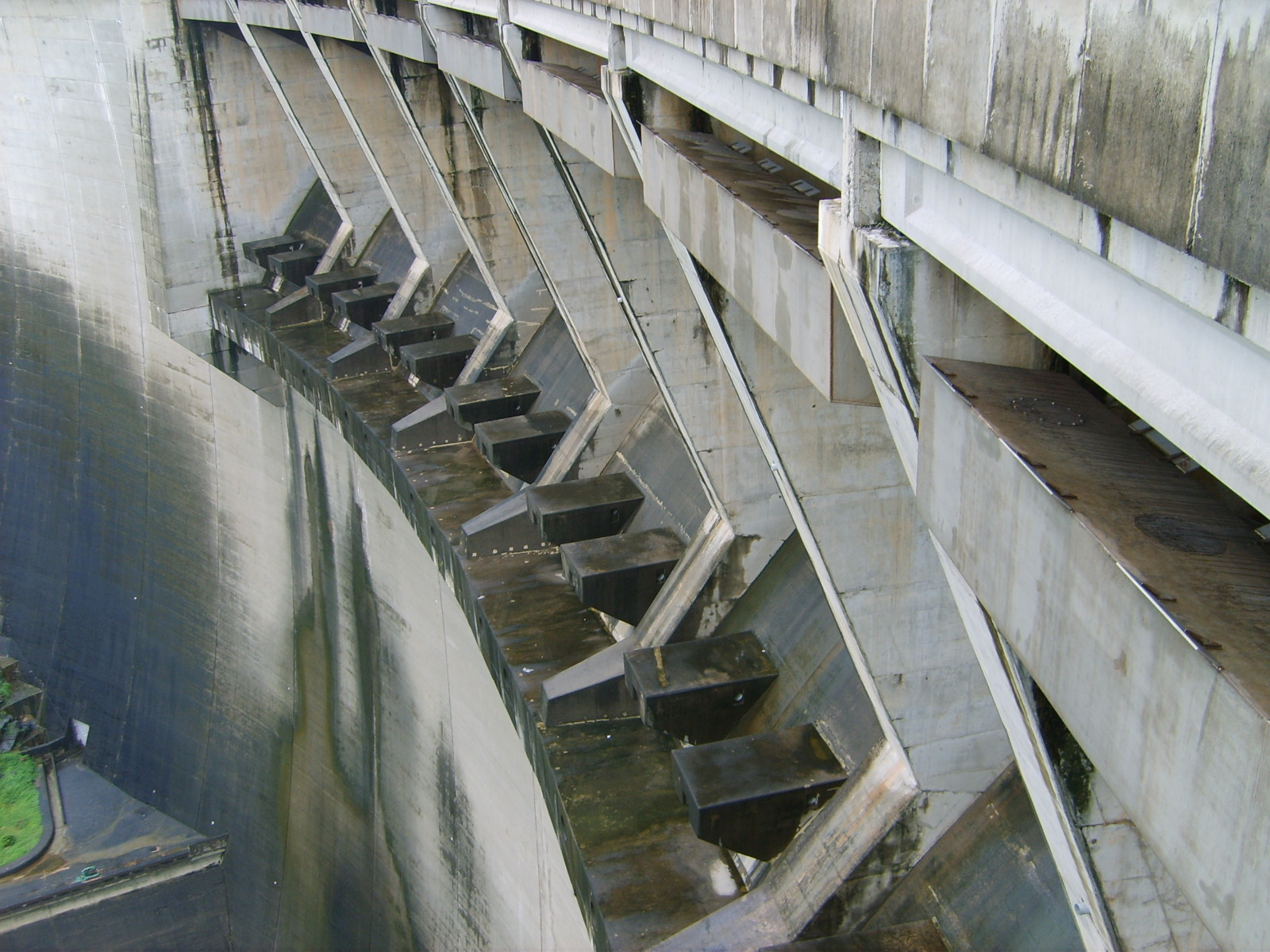
Victoria Dam Sluice Gates

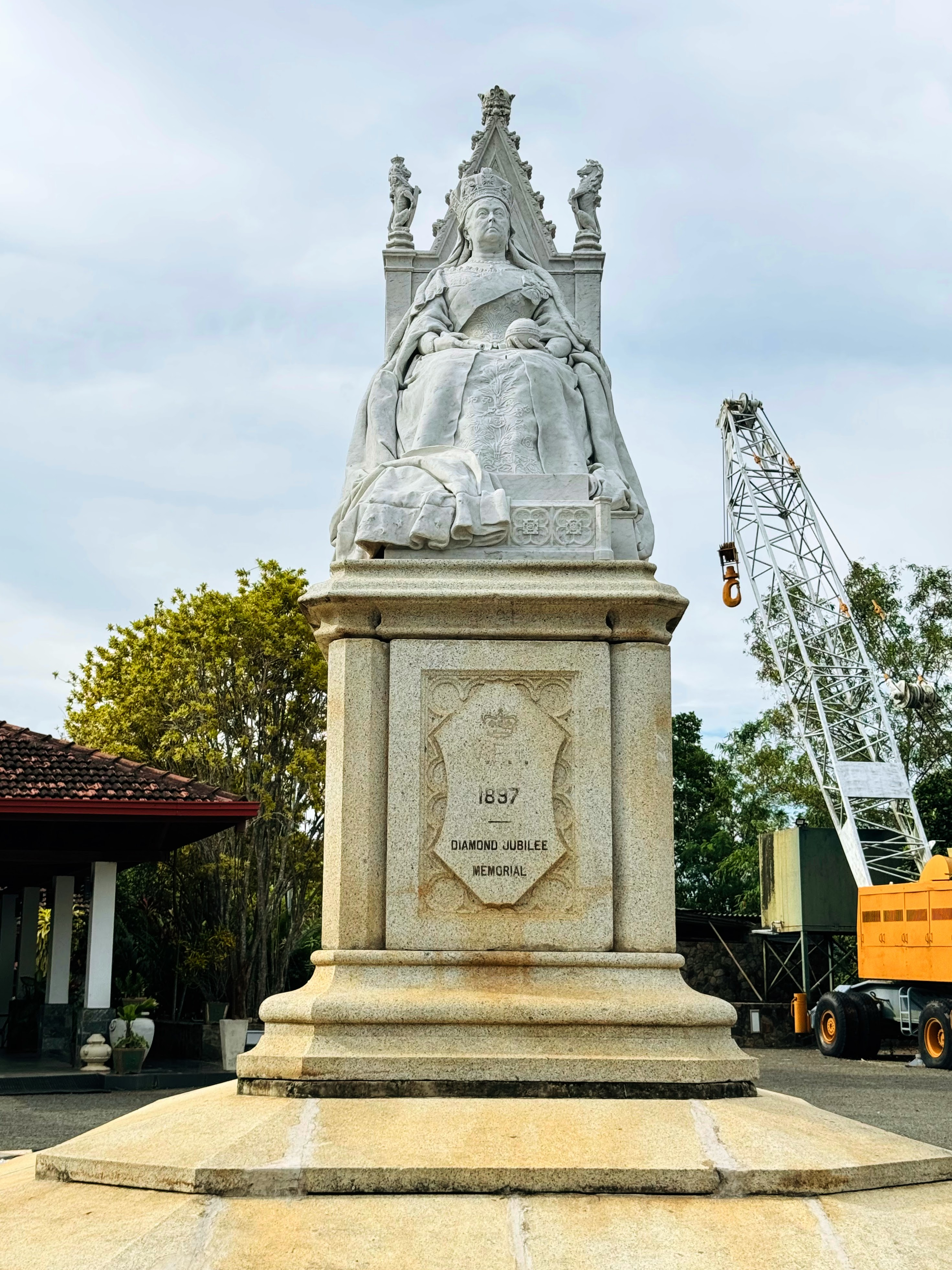
Queen Victoria statue at Victoria Dam
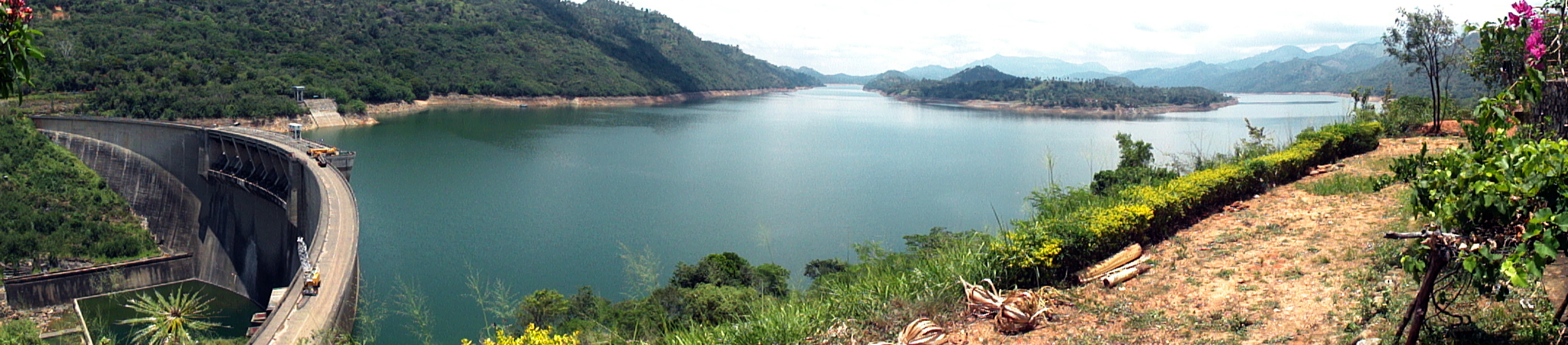
A panoramic view of the Victoria Dam and Reservoir.

== See also ==
- List of dams and reservoirs in Sri Lanka
- List of power stations in Sri Lanka
- List of rivers in Sri Lanka
- Teldeniya (archaeological site)
