= Teldeniya =

Teldeniya තෙල්දෙණිය
- Town
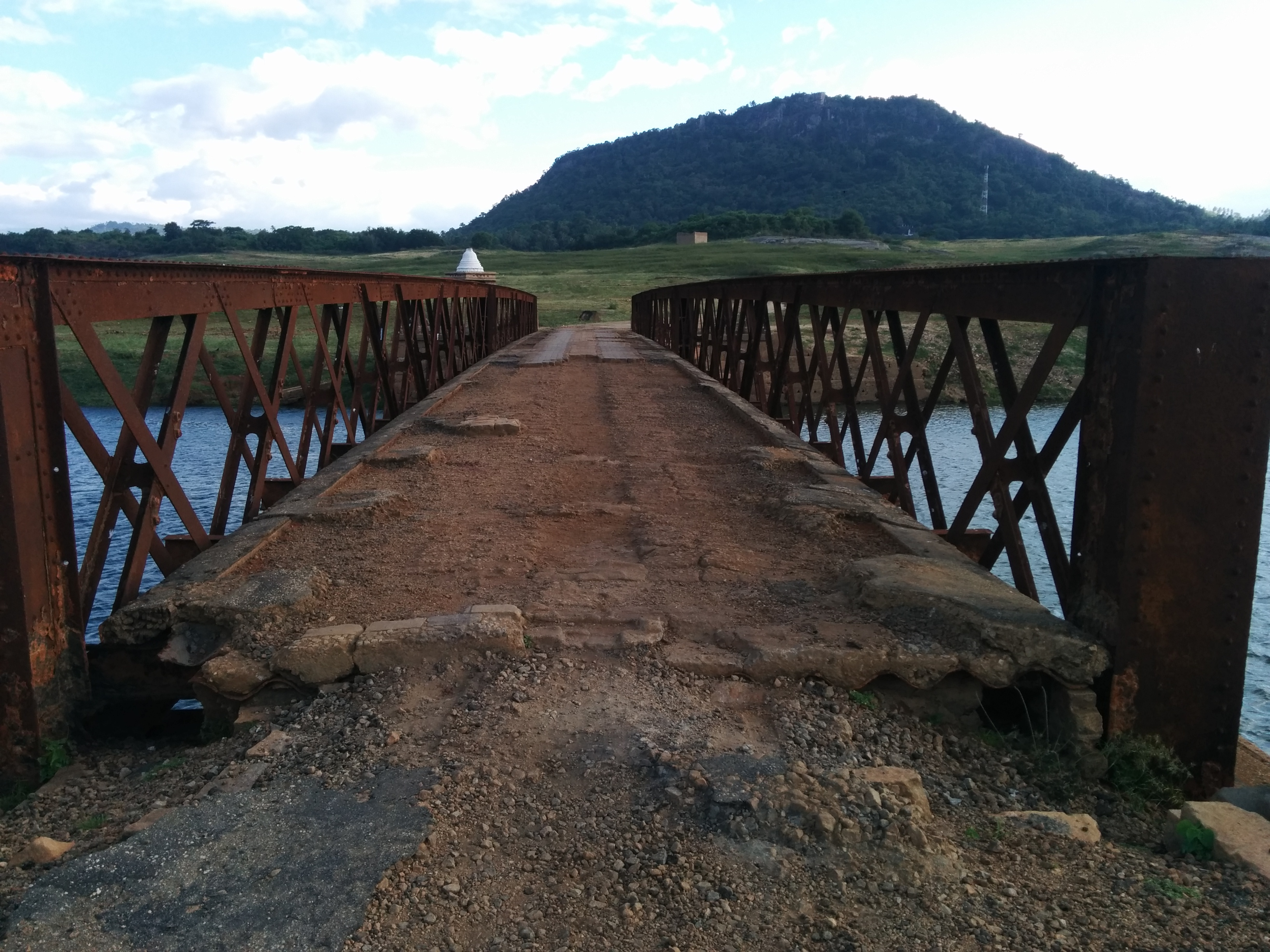
- Remains of bridge in Teldeniya, usually submerged it, it is revealed in droughts.

- Location in Sri Lanka
- Coordinates: 7°18′34.5″N 80°45′53.8″E
- Country: Sri Lanka
- Province: Central Province
- District: Kandy District
- Elevation: 1,552 ft (473 m)

Population
  - Total: 65,000
- Time zone: UTC+5:30 (Sri Lanka Standard Time)
- Postal code: 20900

Teldeniya(තෙල්දෙණිය) was a town in Kandy District in the Central Province of Sri Lanka. The town was submerged during construction of the Victoria Dam.

== See also ==
- List of towns in Central Province, Sri Lanka
