= Ain't =

English-language vernacular inflected form

Ain't (pronounced as /eɪnt/) is a negative inflection for am, is, are, has, and have in informal English. In some dialects, it is also used for do, does, did, and will. The development of ain't for the various forms of be, have, will and do occurred independently, at different times. The use of ain't for the forms of be was established by the mid-18th century and for the forms of have by the early 19th century.

== Etymology ==
Ain't has several antecedents in English, corresponding to the various forms of be and have that ain't is used for. The development of ain't for both verbs is a diachronic coincidence: independent developments and at different times.

=== Inflections of the verb be ===
Amn't as a contraction of am not is known from 1618. As the "mn" combination of two nasal consonants is disfavoured by many English speakers, the "m" of amn't began to be elided, reflected in writing with the new form an't. Aren't as a contraction for are not first appeared in 1675. In non-rhotic dialects, aren't lost its "r" sound, and began to be pronounced as an't.

An't (sometimes a'n't) arose from am not and are not almost simultaneously. An't first appears in print in the work of English Restoration playwrights. In 1695 an't was used as a contraction of "am not", in William Congreve's play Love for Love: "I can hear you farther off, I an't deaf". But as early as 1696 John Vanbrugh uses an't to mean "are not" in The Relapse: "Hark thee shoemaker! These shoes an't ugly, but they don't fit me".

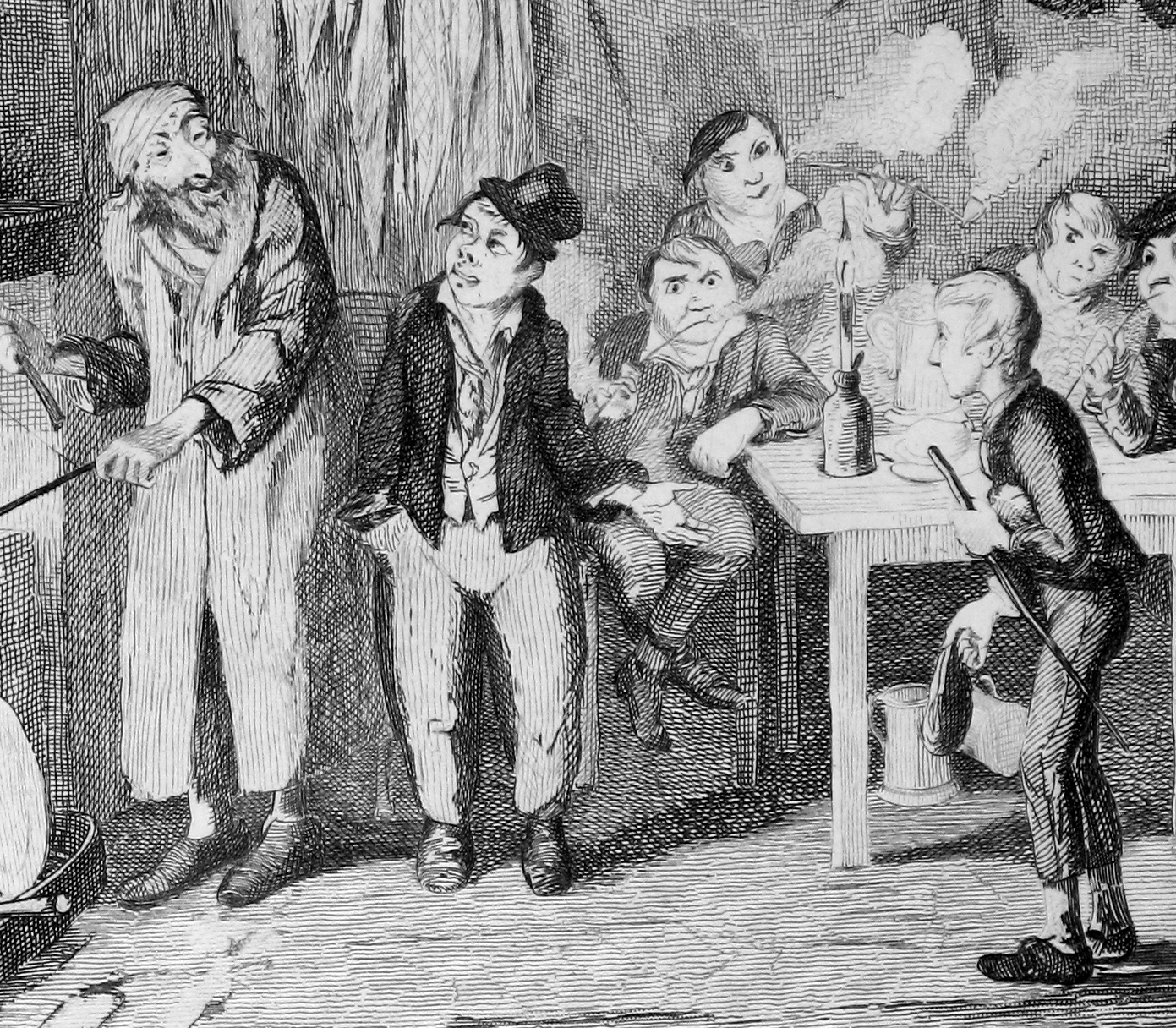
Scene from Charles Dickens' 1838 novel Oliver Twist—the Artful Dodger (a Cockney, middle) introduces Oliver (right) to Fagin (left). Using ain't for is not, Dodger tells Oliver: "There ain't no teacher like Fagin!"

An't for is not may have developed independently from its use for am not and are not. Isn't was sometimes written as in't or en't, which could have changed into an't. An't for is not may also have filled a gap in the paradigm of be. Jonathan Swift used an't to mean is not in Letter 19 of his Journal to Stella (1710–13): It an't my fault, 'tis Patrick's fault; pray now don't blame Presto.

An't with a long "a" sound began to be written as ain't, which first appears in writing in 1749. By the time ain't appeared, an't was already being used for am not, are not and is not. An't and ain't coexisted as written forms well into the 19th century—Charles Dickens used the terms interchangeably, as in Chapter 13, Book the Second of Little Dorrit (1857): "'I guessed it was you, Mr. Pancks", said she, 'for it's quite your regular night; ain't it? ... An't it gratifying, Mr. Pancks, though; really?'". In the memoirs (1808–1810) of the English lawyer William Hickey, ain't appears as a contraction of aren't; "thank God we're all alive, ain't we..."

=== Inflections of the verb have ===
Han't or ha'n't, an early contraction for has not and have not, developed from eliding the "s" of has not and the "v" of have not. Han't appeared in the work of English Restoration playwrights, as in The Country Wife (1675) by William Wycherley: Gentlemen and Ladies, han't you all heard the late sad report / of poor Mr. Horner. Much like an't, han't was sometimes pronounced with a long "a", yielding hain't. With H-dropping, the "h" of han't or hain't gradually disappeared in most dialects and became ain't.

Ain't for has not/have not first appeared in dictionaries in the 1830s and appeared in 1819 in Niles' Weekly Register: Why I ain't got nobody here to strike.... Charles Dickens likewise used ain't to mean haven't in Chapter 28 of Martin Chuzzlewit (1844): "You ain't got nothing to cry for, bless you! He's righter than a trivet!"

Similarly to an't, both han't and ain't were found together late into the nineteenth century, as in Chapter 12 of Dickens' Our Mutual Friend: "'Well, have you finished?' asked the strange man. 'No,' said Riderhood, 'I ain't'....'You sir! You han't said what you want of me.'"

=== Inflections of the verb do ===
Ain't meaning didn't is widely considered unique to African-American Vernacular English, although it can be found in some dialects of Caribbean English as well. It may function not as a true variant of didn't, but as a creole-like tense-neutral negator (sometimes termed "generic ain't"). Its origin may have been due to approximation when early African-Americans acquired English as a second language; it is also possible that early African-Americans inherited it from colonial European-Americans and later kept the variation when it largely passed out of wider usage. Besides the standard construction ain't got, ain't is rarely attested for the present-tense constructions do not or does not.

== Linguistic characteristics ==
Ain't is formed by the same rule that English speakers use to form aren't and other negative inflections of auxiliary verbs. Linguists consider use of ain't to be grammatical, as long as its users convey their intended meaning to their audience. In other words, a sentence such as "She ain't got no sense" is grammatical because it generally follows a native speaker's word order, and because a native speaker would recognize its meaning. Linguists distinguish, however, between grammaticality and acceptability: what may be considered grammatical across all dialects may nevertheless not be acceptable in certain dialects or contexts. The usage of ain't is socially unacceptable in some situations.

Ain't has in part to plug what is known as the "amn't gap" – the anomalous situation in standard English whereby there are standard negative inflections for other forms of be (aren't for are, and isn't for is), but nothing unproblematic for am. Historically, ain't has filled the gap where one might expect amn't, even in contexts where other uses of ain't were disfavored. Standard dialects that regard ain't as non-standard often substitute aren't for am not in tag questions (e.g., "I'm doing okay, aren't I?"), while leaving the "amn't gap" open in declarative statements.

== Proscription and stigma ==
Ain't has been called "the most stigmatized word in the language", as well as "the most powerful social marker" in English. It is a prominent example in English of a shibboleth – a word used to determine inclusion in, or exclusion from, a group.

Historically, this was not so. For most of its history, ain't was acceptable across many social and regional contexts. Throughout the 17th, 18th and 19th centuries, ain't and its predecessors were part of normal usage for both educated and uneducated English speakers and found in the correspondence and fiction of, among others, Jonathan Swift, Lord Byron, Henry Fielding and George Eliot. For Victorian English novelists William Makepeace Thackeray and Anthony Trollope, the educated and upper classes in 19th century England could use ain't freely, but in familiar speech only. Ain't continued to be used without restraint by many upper middle class speakers in southern England into the beginning of the 20th century.

Ain't was a prominent target of early prescriptivist writers. In the 18th and early 19th centuries, some writers began to propound the need to establish a "pure" or "correct" form of English. Contractions in general were disapproved of, but ain't and its variants were seen as particularly "vulgar". This push for "correctness" was driven mainly by the middle class, which led to an incongruous situation in which non-standard constructions continued to be used by both lower and upper classes, but not by the middle class. The reason for the strength of the proscription against ain't is not entirely clear.

The strong proscription against ain't in standard English has led to many misconceptions, often expressed jocularly (or ironically), as "ain't ain't a word" or "ain't ain't in the dictionary." Ain't is listed in most dictionaries, including (in 2012) Oxford Dictionaries Online and Merriam-Webster. However, Oxford Dictionaries Online states "it does not form part of standard English and should never be used in formal or written contexts" and Merriam-Webster states it is "widely disapproved as non-standard and more common in the habitual speech of the less educated".

Webster's Third New International Dictionary, published in 1961, went against then-standard practice when it included the following usage note in its entry on ain't: "though disapproved by many and more common in less educated speech, used orally in most parts of the U.S. by many cultivated speakers esp. in the phrase ain't I." Many commentators disapproved of the dictionary's relatively permissive attitude toward the word, which was inspired, in part, by the belief of its editor, Philip Gove, that "distinctions of usage were elitist and artificial".

== Regional usage and dialects ==
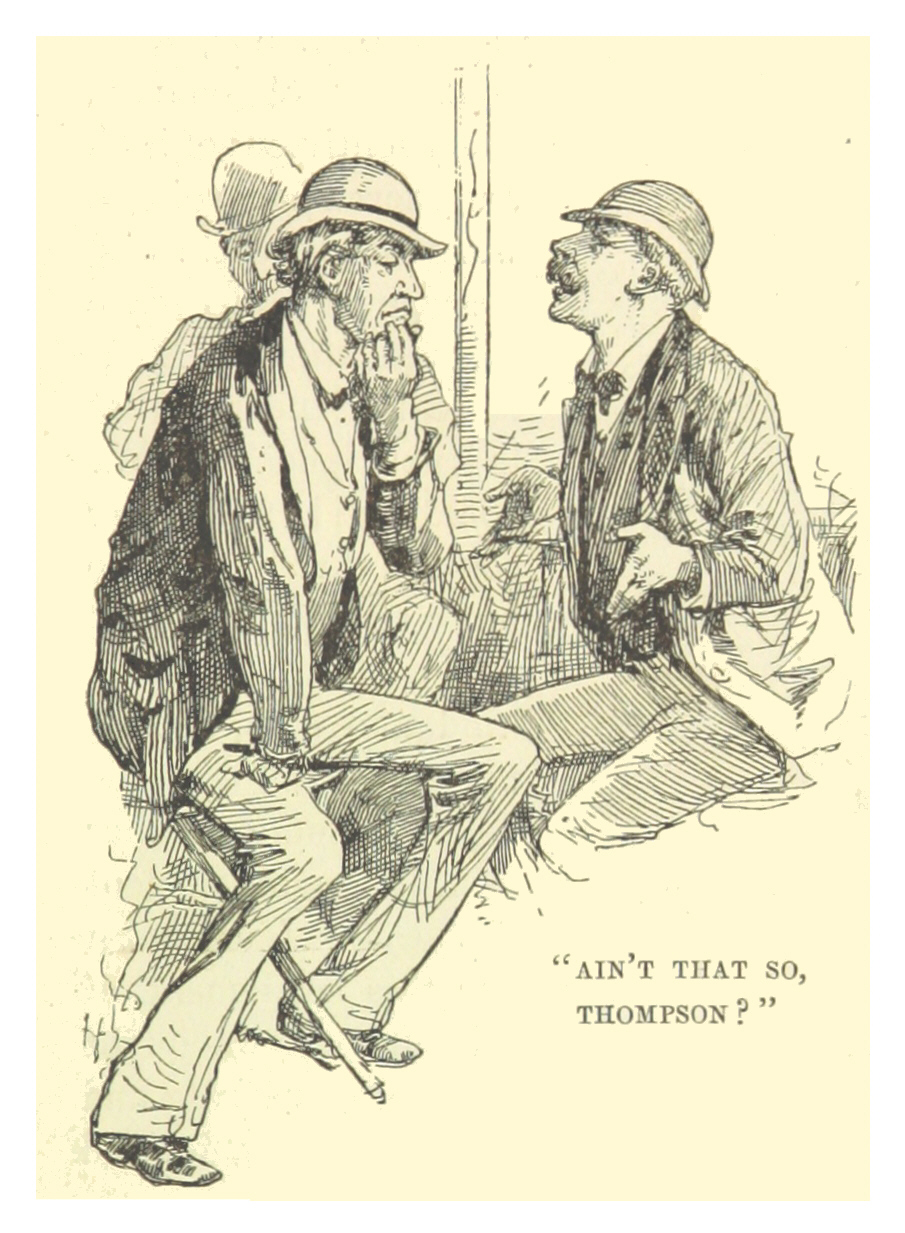
From Mark Twain, Life on the Mississippi, 1883

Ain't is found across regions and classes of the English-speaking world and is among the most pervasive nonstandard terms in English. It is one of two negation features (the other being the double negative) that are known to appear in all nonstandard English dialects. Ain't is used in much of the United Kingdom, with its geographical distribution increasing over time. It is also found throughout most of North America, including in Appalachia, the South, New England, the Mid-Atlantic and the Upper Midwest of the United States and Canada, particularly in rural communities and the Western Provinces. In its geographical ubiquity, ain't is to be contrasted with other folk usages such as y'all, strongly associated with the Southern United States.

In England, ain't is generally considered non-standard, as it is used by speakers of a lower socio-economic class or by educated people in an informal manner. In the nineteenth century, ain't was often used by writers to denote regional dialects such as Cockney English. A notable exponent of the term is Cockney flower girl Eliza Doolittle from George Bernard Shaw's play Pygmalion; "I ain't done nothing wrong by speaking to the gentleman". Ain't is a non-standard feature commonly found in mainstream Australian English and in New Zealand, ain't is a feature of Māori-influenced English. In American English, usage of ain't corresponds to a middle level of education, although its use is widely believed to show a lack of education or social standing.

The usage of ain't in the southern United States is distinctive, however, in the continued usage of the word by well-educated, cultivated speakers. Ain't was described in 1972 as in common use by educated Southerners, and in the South used as a marker to separate cultured speakers from those who lacked confidence in their social standing and thus avoided its use entirely.

In the Merico creole of Liberia, ain't has become ɛ̃ or ẽ.

== Rhetorical and popular usage ==
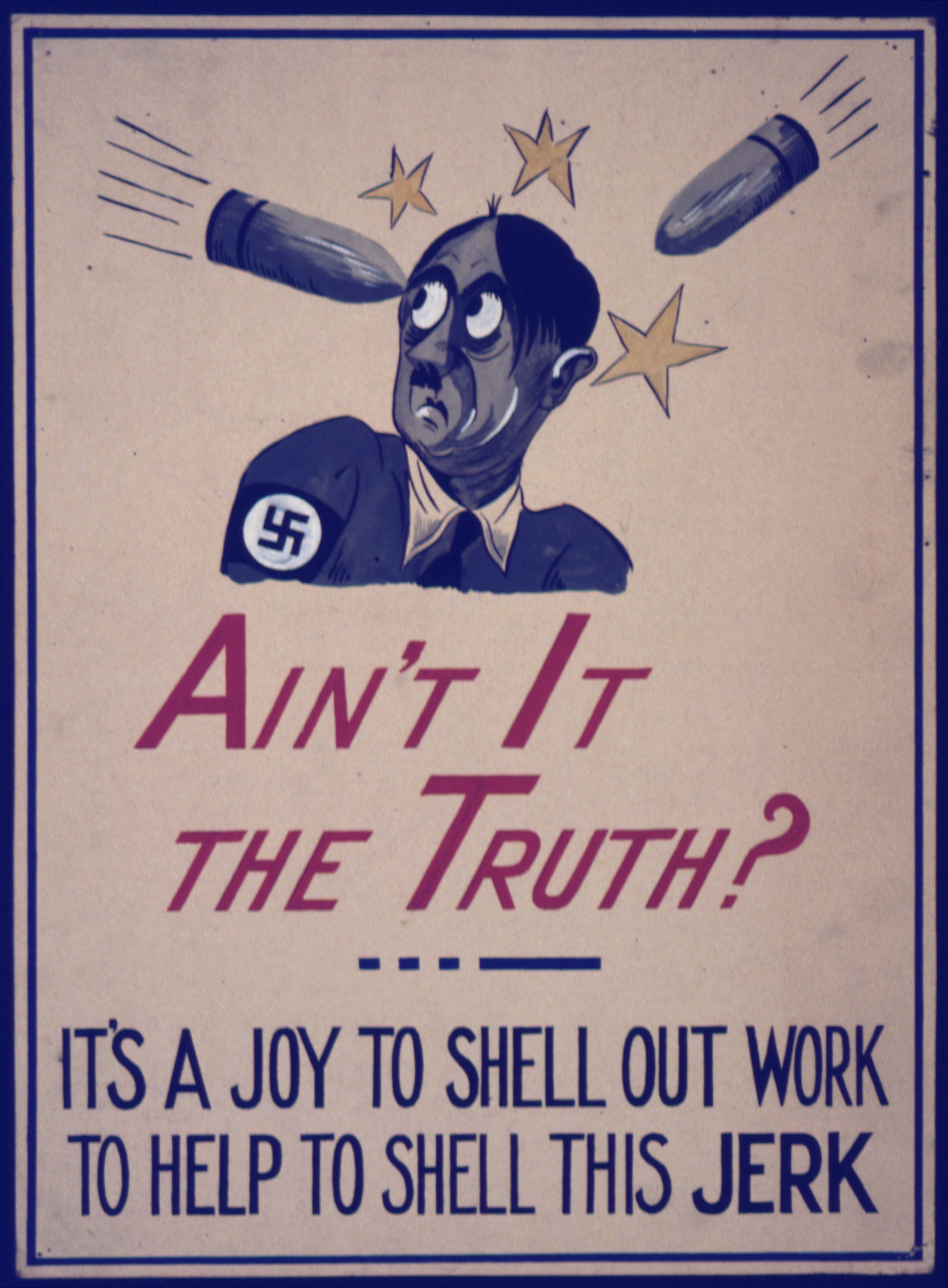
An American propaganda poster from World War II, using ain't for rhetorical effect

Ain't can be used in both speech and writing to catch attention and to emphasize, as in "Ain't that a crying shame" or "If it ain't broke, don't fix it." Merriam-Webster's Collegiate Dictionary gives an example from film critic Richard Schickel: "the wackiness of movies, once so deliciously amusing, ain't funny anymore." It can also be used deliberately for what The Oxford Dictionary of American Usage and Style describes as "tongue-in-cheek" or "reverse snobbery". Star baseball pitcher Dizzy Dean, a member of the Baseball Hall of Fame and later a popular announcer, once said, "A lot of people who don't say ain't, ain't eatin'."

Although ain't is seldom found in formal writing, it is frequently used in informal writing, such as popular song lyrics. In genres such as traditional country music, blues, rock n' roll and hip-hop, lyrics often include nonstandard features such as ain't. This is principally due to the use of such features as markers of "covert identity and prestige".

== Notable usage ==
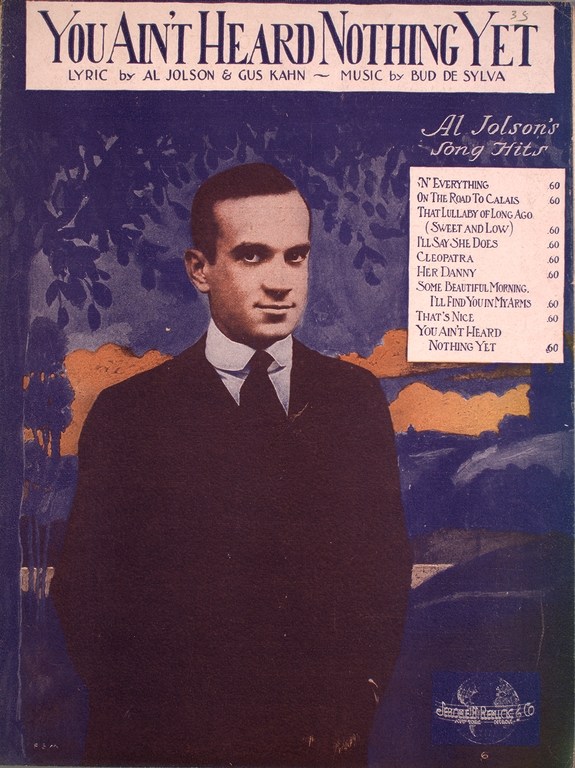
"You Ain't Heard Nothing Yet", 1919

- "Ain't I a Woman?", 1851 speech by abolitionist Sojourner Truth.
- "If you want to know who we are", from The Mikado lyrics by W. S. Gilbert "We figure in lively paint: Our attitude's queer and quaint—You're wrong if you think it ain't." (1885).
- "Say it ain't so, Joe", headline of an article by a Chicago Daily News reporter about Shoeless Joe Jackson's involvement in the Black Sox scandal, later attributed to an anonymous young baseball fan.
- "You ain't heard nothing yet!" spoken by Al Jolson in The Jazz Singer (1927), the first feature-length motion picture with synchronized dialogue sequences. That spoken line and others in the film, introduced the "talkies" and revolutionized the movie industry.
- "It Ain't Necessarily So", song from Porgy and Bess (1935); music by George Gershwin, words by Ira Gershwin.
- "Ain't No Grave", a 1934/1953 American gospel song attributed to Claude Ely.
- "He ain't heavy, he's my brother" has been used as the motto of Boys Town since 1943 and inspired a song "He Ain't Heavy, He's My Brother", written by Bobby Scott and Bob Russell and recorded by The Hollies, Neil Diamond and others.
- Winston Churchill, commenting on the 1954 portrait by Graham Sutherland, said "It makes me look half-witted, which I ain't".
- "Ain't That a Shame" is a song written by Fats Domino and Dave Bartholomew, released by Imperial Records in 1955, which sold over a million copies and introduced Fats Domino to a wider audience.
- Fings Ain't Wot They Used T'Be, 1960 West End musical comedy about Cockney life.
- "You Ain't Seen Nothing Yet," a 1974 single by Canadian rock band Bachman-Turner Overdrive that reached #1 in the United States on the Billboard Hot 100.
- Ain't Misbehavin', a 1978 musical revue with a book by Murray Horwitz and Richard Maltby Jr., and music by various composers and lyricists as arranged and orchestrated by Luther Henderson. It is named after the song by Fats Waller (with Harry Brooks and Andy Razaf), "Ain't Misbehavin'".
- Ain't Nobody's Business If You Do: The Absurdity of Consensual Crimes in a Free Society, a 1993 book by Peter McWilliams, in which he presents the history of legislation against what he feels are victimless crimes, or crimes that are committed consensually, as well as arguments for their legalization.
- "If I Ain't Got You", a 2003 song by Alicia Keys.
- "Ain't Nobody Got Time for That", a line spoken in a KFOR News Channel 4 interview, which became a popular Internet meme in 2012.

== See also ==
- English auxiliary verbs
- English usage controversies
