= Movement of Spiritual Inner Awareness =

US non-profit religious corporation

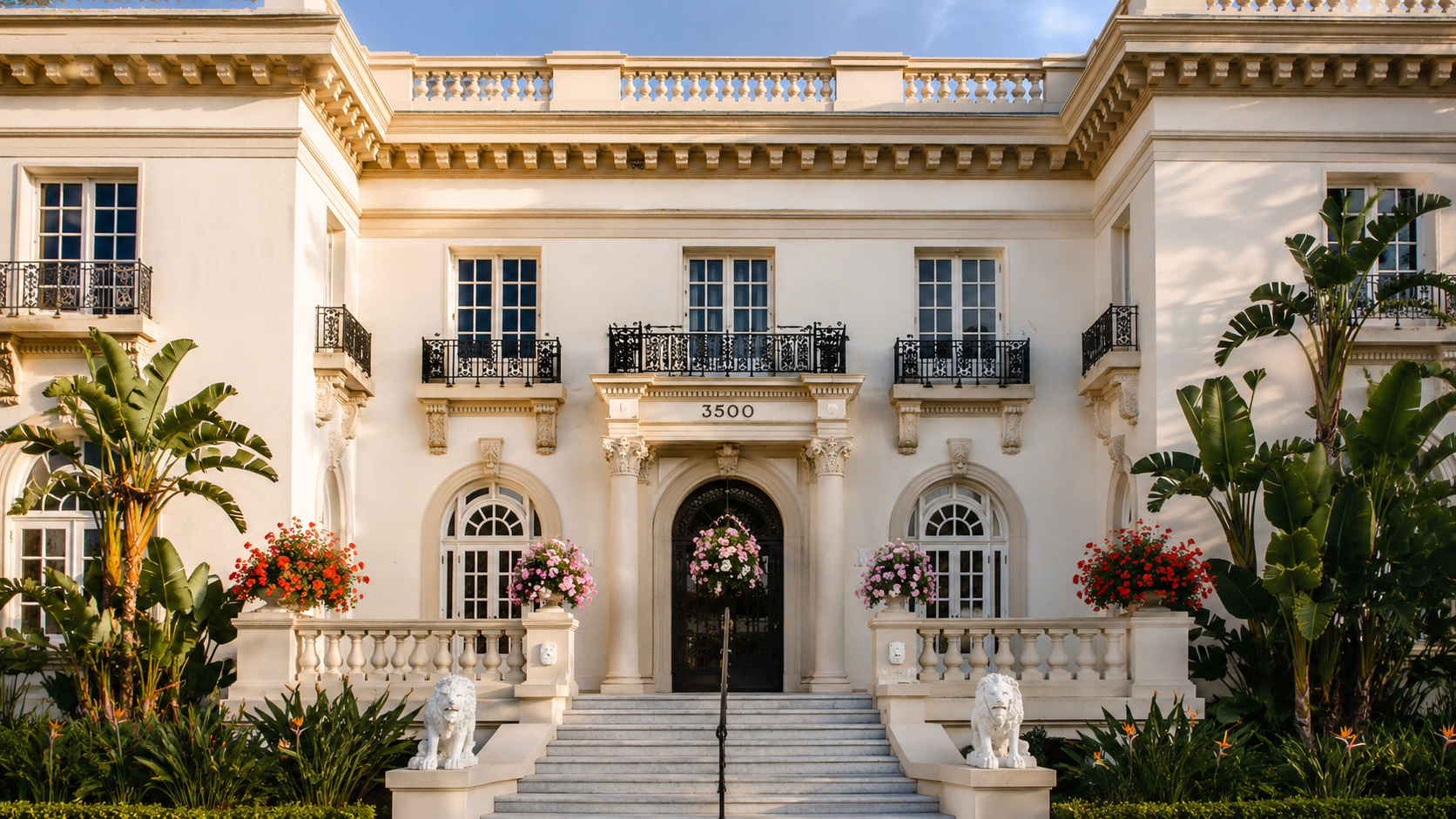
- Formation: 1968 (formation); June 25, 1971 (incorporation)
- Founder: John-Roger Hinkins
- Legal status: Non-profit religious corporation
- Headquarters: Los Angeles, California, U.S.
- Spiritual Director: John Morton
- Website: www.msia.org

The Movement of Spiritual Inner Awareness (or MSIA) is an American non-profit religious corporation, incorporated in California on June 25, 1971. The group was founded in California in 1968 by John-Roger (formerly Roger Delano Hinkins).

== History and teachings ==
MSIA teaches an active meditation technique known as Spiritual Exercises (SEs). Chanting specific sacred Sanskrit words internally is part of SEs. In this aspect MSIA SEs are similar to Transcendental Meditation (TM) practices. MSIA also offers its students a twelve-year study support subscription called Soul Awareness Discourses. Discourses are seen as an opportunity for individuals to connect inwardly with their own Divinity, each according to their desire and intention. Topics covered expose students to the teachings of MSIA and educate them to stay focused on their individual spiritual practices and service to others. Both initiatory tones and personal discourses are deemed sacred to each student individually and are not shared.

The Founder, John-Roger (formerly Roger Hinkins) died on October 22, 2014. His successor, John Morton directs the group. Both have been referred to as the "Traveler".

MSIA considers itself a church in very few traditional senses of the word. A deeply ambivalent attitude towards traditional "religiosity" characterizes the "Movement." While it is legally incorporated as a church and provides tools and techniques for Soul transcendence for those who are looking for them, it prohibits members from evangelizing; it spreads primarily by word of mouth. MSIA has no program of building churches or other buildings, giving it similarities with other 'churches without walls.' It ordains ministers, but ordains no one to preach or teach, only to be of service. Service choices are determined entirely individually. MSIA has only vague and wide guidelines here.

Soul Transcendence, as defined by MSIA, is the process of becoming aware of yourself as a soul and as one with God. MSIA considers that its teachings draw primarily on the ministry of Jesus Christ ("The Christ Consciousness is the spiritual line of energy undergirding MSIA"); teachings also include elements of Buddhism, Taoism, Judaism, and the Sant Mat/Radhasoami tradition.

The teachings of the Movement of Spiritual Inner Awareness are offered through the Soul Awareness Discourses, its streaming platform That Which Is, and through its educational arm, Peace Theological Seminary & College of Philosophy. These are available online through the MSIA website or its mobile application, in addition to workshops, seminars, retreats, and live-streamed classes accessible worldwide.

== Criticism and controversy ==
MSIA has been criticized by a variety of people over the years, but David C. Lane and Peter McWilliams, who provide the most substantive body of criticism, both focus on the role of founder John-Roger. The gist of Lane's criticism of Hinkins is that he used spiritual teachings taken from Paul Twitchell's Eckankar (who in turn took them from Radha Soami Satsang Beas, with which Lane is actively involved).

Ex-MSIA Minister Peter McWilliams wrote Life 102: What to Do When Your Guru Sues You, which was critical of Hinkins. McWilliams also dismisses MSIA as little more than a personality cult. In his book, McWilliams asserts that Hinkins suffered from narcissistic personality disorder, possibly due to his 1963 coma.

McWilliams chronicles his extended relationship with Hinkins, accusing him of various misrepresentations and improprieties. However, McWilliams later agreed to abandon the copyright to MSIA to settle libel litigation over the contents of the book, and later asked that the book be removed from circulation in a notarized letter, stating "the content of the book is no longer one with which I would like to have my name associated."

In his book The Missionary Position author Christopher Hitchens criticizes both Mother Teresa and John-Roger for a staged photo shoot where the two posed together in a studio with a blank backdrop. A blurred backdrop of Calcutta's poor was added later. Hitchens questions the ethics of such a shoot, as well as Mother Teresa for accepting US$10,000 as part of an "Integrity Award" from MSIA, which he describes as having been "exposed in print as corrupt and fanatical".

=== Cult allegations ===
MSIA has frequently been accused of being a cult of personality. Whether or not MSIA should be labeled a cult is a matter of dispute. Both the movement and its founder have been through alleged scandals (published in People Magazine and the Los Angeles Times among other publications) suggesting financial improprieties as well as sexual misconduct by Hinkins. MSIA gained widespread attention during the senatorial campaign of Michael Huffington, whose wife, Arianna Huffington, denied that she was a member of MSIA.

== Prominent people associated with MSIA ==
A number of well-known individuals and public figures have been connected to MSIA, mostly since the 1970s. The most prominent among them is author and businesswoman Arianna Huffington, whose association with the group and John-Roger received widespread media coverage during the 1994 U.S. Senate campaign of her then-husband, Michael Huffington.

Motivational speaker Tony Robbins collaborated in the 1980s on several events held at the organization's facilities in Santa Monica. In the documentary Mystical Traveler – The Life and Times of Dr. John-Roger, Robbins praised John-Roger's tolerant demeanor and the good relationship they maintained during that time.

Other members from the entertainment industry include Beach Boys member Carl Wilson.

Actress Leigh Taylor-Young, also ordained as a minister in 1975, plays an active role in the organization following her 2013 marriage to John Morton, the movement's current spiritual director.

Actor and director Jsu Garcia produced films based on the founder's writings during the 2000s and 2010s, such as Spiritual Warriors (2006) and the documentary Mystical Traveler (2014).

Other professionals associated with the movement include author and management consultant David Allen.

Author Peter McWilliams was also an MSIA minister but later repudiated MSIA and made a series of personal allegations against MSIA leader John-Roger in his book Life 102: What to Do When Your Guru Sues You.
