= Life 102 =

1994 book by Peter McWilliams

Life 102: What to Do When Your Guru Sues You
- Dustjacket of original, hardcover edition
- Author: Peter McWilliams
- Language: English
- Subject: Self-help, Cults
- Genre: nonfiction psychology cults
- Publisher: Prelude Press, Los Angeles
- Publication date: 1994
- Publication place: United States
- Media type: Hardcover
- Pages: 423
- ISBN: 093158034X
- OCLC: 31279232
- Dewey Decimal: 158/.092/2 B 21
- LC Class: BP605.M68 M39 1994

Life 102: What to Do When Your Guru Sues You is a book by Peter McWilliams. Couched in the tone of the author's Life 101 self-help books, it levels a series of allegations against John-Roger (Roger Delano Hinkins), founder of the Movement of Spiritual Inner Awareness (MSIA) and Insight Seminars.

In 1990, McWilliams left the MSIA. The latter sued McWilliams for unpaid royalties of Life 101 sales. McWilliams claimed he was the sole author of the Life 101 series, and had been duped (or "programmed") into adding John-Roger as an author. Publishing Life 102 was perceived as a blackmail strategy by the MSIA.

These allegations caused the book, self-published in 1994 under McWilliams' Prelude Press imprint, to itself become the subject of litigation for libel. John-Roger bought the publishing rights from McWilliams for $3 million and quickly ceased publication. The remaining copies were withdrawn from sale. The volume discusses in detail McWilliams's own experiences over a 15-year period:

As much as we like to think that we are independent-minded, free-willed, autonomous individuals, the fact remains that some part of us is still susceptible to programming.

Programming can happen to anyone. Intelligence, education, common sense, belief, or convictions offer little protection. All it takes is repetition (the slow route) or vulnerability (the fast route) and, eventually, we're hooked. Master programmers – from cult leaders to cigarette companies to government agencies – do both, as often as possible, whether you like it or not.

Ironically, the more immune to programming you think you are, the more susceptible you become.

McWilliams describes his struggle with depression, and claims that Hinkins promised him "spiritual healing" in exchange for crediting "John-Roger" as co-author of a series of self-improvement manuals which later made the New York Times best-seller lists.

Hinkins sued McWiliams for libel. They settled out of court with Hinkins buying the publishing rights for $3 million. The volume has been out of print ever since. David C. Lane, a professor of at Mt. San Antonio College, California, assisted McWilliams by providing him with research material on various religions, including Lane's own dissertation thesis. In exchange McWilliams agreed to make available free a copy of his book for non-commercial purposes on Lane's website, The Neural Surfer. After securing the rights Hinkins sued Prof. Lane in order to force him to take down the last available copy of Life 102.

Peter McWilliams, at that time dying of AIDS and in federal prison for the use of medical marijuana, was disregarded as a witness and the court ruled in favour of Hinkins. The court ordered Lane to pay Hinkins's legal fees. Lane bluffed that he was planning to write a follow-up book, Life 103: John-Roger against me. Hinkins soon agreed to pay the costs himself:

I told the president of MSIA 'Dont worry [...] I'll pay the legal fees. Just tell John-Roger one thing. That not everything was stolen from my house when he robbed it and I'm writing a new book "Life 103: John-Roger against me". Just tell him that'. They come back, they go 'We will pay the legal bill and we will offer you money not to write that book'
