= John-Roger Hinkins =

American minister (1934–2014)

- Born: Roger Delano Hinkins; September 24, 1934; Carbon County, Utah, US
- Died: October 22, 2014 (aged 80); Los Angeles, California, US
- Other names: "J-R," "John-Roger"
- Education: B.A., University of Utah
- Known for: Founder of the Movement of Spiritual Inner Awareness (MSIA)
- Title: Spiritual Director of MSIA (retired); Ordained Minister of MSIA (1971)
- Successor: John K. Morton
- Website: www.john-roger.org

John-Roger Hinkins (born Roger Delano Hinkins) (September 24, 1934 – October 22, 2014) was an American author, public speaker, and founder of the Movement of Spiritual Inner Awareness (MSIA), as well as several other New Age, spiritual, and self-help organizations.

== Biography ==
=== Early life and education ===
Hinkins was born on September 24, 1934, and raised in the small mining town of Rains, Utah. He was brought up in the Mormon faith, As a youth, he attended the local LDS church's Young Men's Mutual Improvement Association and occasionally gave inspirational "three-minute talks." Hinkins described his childhood as "typical," distinguished only by an early belief that he could spot auras, colorful fields that some people believe surround the human body. After graduating from high school, Hinkins attended the University of Utah in Salt Lake City, where he earned a degree in psychology in 1958. While in college, he worked as a night orderly in the psychiatric hospital ward of a Salt Lake City hospital. He then moved to San Francisco to work as an insurance claims adjuster.

He received a Secondary Life Teaching Credential from the State of California, and performed post-graduate work at University of California, Los Angeles, University of Southern California and California State University, Los Angeles. He then began teaching English at Rosemead High School in a suburb of Los Angeles.

=== "Mystical Traveler Consciousness" ===
Hinkins relates having had a near-death experience while undergoing surgery for a kidney stone in late 1963, after which he fell into a nine-day coma. After this experience, Hinkins says he became aware of another "spiritual personality" that had superseded or merged with his previous personality. He began to refer to himself as "John-Roger."

Hinkins termed this new consciousness the "Mystical Traveler Consciousness." According to Hinkins, he was chosen to "anchor" the consciousness on this planet, and was passed the "keys" to do so by the previous receptor of the consciousness, Sawan Singh, the Radhasoami Satsang Beas master who died in 1948, while he was on the "inner spiritual planes." According to Hinkins, he held the "keys" to the consciousness from December 1963 until December 1988, when they were passed to John Morton, the subsequent spiritual director of Hinkins's organization MSIA.

Hinkins maintained that humans are locked in an eternal cycle of reincarnation and karma, and can only escape by ascending from Earth's negative realms into "a totally positive state of being" called "soul consciousness." This, according to his teachings, is nearly impossible without the assistance of the Mystical Traveler Consciousness he believes he embodies. He has written that "Initiates of the Mystical Traveler Consciousness are those that I am specifically taking home to God."

=== Movement of Spiritual Inner Awareness (MSIA) ===
In 1968, five years after his coma, Hinkins began to hold seminars as an independent spiritual teacher in homes of friends in Santa Barbara and Thousand Oaks. The demand for his seminars grew, until in 1971, Hinkins resigned from his job as a high school English teacher and formally incorporated the Church of the Movement of Spiritual Inner Awareness.

MSIA is a nondenominational and ecumenical church, the stated purpose of which is to teach "Soul Transcendence — becoming aware of yourself as a Soul and as one with God, not as a theory but as a living reality." As of 2004 MSIA had participants in over 30 countries, with its largest following in the United States, Australia, Colombia, Brazil, and Nigeria respectively. The church was estimated in 1993 to have 4500 members.

Controversy has surrounded MSIA: it has been accused of being a cult by some former members and by the Cult Awareness and Information Centre, and claims have been made that Hinkins had unethical sexual relationships with members.

MSIA has also been accused of being an "offshoot" of the organization Lifespring, a private, for-profit, New Age/human potential training company founded in 1974. According to Nan Kathryn Fuchs, a long-time devoted member of MSIA and a minister who served on the Ministerial Board for a number of years, Hinkins' teachings changed substantially in tone when Russell Bishop introduced his version of Lifespring Training to a group of MSIA ministers and John-Roger adopted the method, calling it "Insight Training Seminars." Russell Bishop ran the new Insight Seminars.

Regarding this time, Nan Fuchs wrote, "As the money began to roll in, John-Roger became more inaccessible, and his aphorisms changed from 'Help yourself so you can help others' to 'Use everything to your advantage.' He certainly has."

=== Other organizations founded ===
In addition to MSIA, Hinkins has founded several other non-profit organizations. In 1976, he founded Koh-e-nor University, later renamed the University of Santa Monica (USM), a private, now-unaccredited institution which for several years offered a master's degree in Spiritual Psychology. Prior to his death, Hinkins served as the chancellor of the University.

In 1977 Hinkins founded the Peace Theological Seminary & College of Philosophy (PTS). An educational non-profit organization, PTS offers undergraduate workshops, courses and retreats, and postgraduate programs centered on the teachings of MSIA. The school, an ecumenical and non-denominational, offered Masters and Doctorate degrees in Spiritual Science. Hinkins received his doctorate in Spiritual Science from this organization, and was its president.

In 1978 Hinkins created the Insight organization with friend and fellow MSIA Minister Russell Bishop. Insight Seminars is an international non-profit educational organization headquartered in Santa Monica, California. Hinkins served as Insight Seminars' chairman of the board.

In 1979, Hinkins founded the Heartfelt Foundation, a volunteer-driven, 501(c)(3) non-profit organization dedicated to serving and assisting people in any form of need.

In 1982, Hinkins founded the Institute for Individual and World Peace (IIWP), a volunteer-driven 501(c)(3) non-profit organization dedicated to studying, identifying, and presenting the processes that lead to peace.

=== Author and filmmaker ===
Hinkins is the author of over 55 books, including The Rest of Your Life (2007), Timeless Wisdoms (2008). He has given more than 6000 seminars over the last forty years, most of which have been recorded either in audio or video format by NOW Productions. Hinkins also produced his own national cable TV show, That Which Is.

In 1988, Hinkins partnered with actor Jsu Garcia to create 'Scott J-R Productions', a film production company committed to creating "spirit-filled" films. Their first full-length feature was My Little Havana, followed by Spiritual Warriors, based on Hinkins' book Spiritual Warrior: The Art of Spiritual Living.

== Notable followers and associates ==
Several well-known individuals and public figures have worked with, or, with varying levels of dedication, have been associated with Hinkins since the 1970s. The most prominent of these is Arianna Huffington. Other notable students of Hinkins are the Beach Boys' Carl Wilson; actress Jaime King-Newman; actress Sally Kirkland, an MSIA minister since 1975; actress Leigh Taylor-Young, also an MSIA minister since 1975; actor Jsu Garcia; and author and management consultant David Allen. Author Peter McWilliams was also an MSIA minister but later repudiated MSIA and made a series of personal allegations against Hinkins in his book Life 102: What to Do When Your Guru Sues You.

== Accusations of cultism, criminal conduct and abuse ==
In the 1980s and early 1990s, several former members of MSIA accused Hinkins of various crimes and abuses, including high-tech charlatanism, the sexual coercion of young male staffers, brainwashing and intimidation, and plagiarism. These allegations, as well as the revelation of the high-profile Arianna Huffington's association with the group, led to a series of investigations by publications such as People, Playboy, the Los Angeles Times and Vanity Fair. MSIA began to be referred to by some elements of the media as a cult. Cult expert and psychologist Steven Hassan, when asked by ABC News Nightline's Ted Koppel if MSIA qualified as a cult, responded:

In my professional opinion it does. It's a pyramid-structured authoritarian regime that uses deception in recruitment and mind control techniques to keep people dependent and obedient. People are instilled with phobias that if they ever question John-Roger or if they ever leave the group terrible things will happen to them.

=== Charlatanism ===
Dissidents in the organization say Hinkins employed covert listening devices at MSIA's Santa Monica headquarters to support his claim of possessing extrasensory perception. One disenchanted member claimed "What people thought was J-R's clairvoyance was just his cunning and deceitful information gathering."

Former MSIA member Terry O'Shaughnessy described to the Los Angeles Times how, in the course of installing sound equipment he and a co-worker found tiny microphones hidden in every room of the Insight headquarters. He later discovered that the microphones all fed into a switch arrangement in John-Roger's personal office, and learned they had been installed by members of John-Roger's personal staff.

O'Shaughnessy's wife, Susan, recounted that former MSIA member Michael Hesse told her he had installed recording devices on the telephones at the Insight headquarters. "I realized that so much of what I thought was psychic power was good old electronics," she said.

Insight facilitators reported that John-Roger monitored Insight training seminars via remote controlled video cameras connected to his private office.

=== Sexual coercion ===
Susan and Wendell Whitmore, who joined MSIA in the early '70s, finally decided to leave MSIA in 1983 after several male staff members confessed during an informal group discussion that Hinkins had used spiritual threats and promises to coerce them into having sex with him. The Whitmores claim that MSIA members had been led to believe that Hinkins had taken a vow of celibacy, and therefore did not question the series of attractive young men that stayed in his house. "He always had someone sleeping in his bedroom at night, supposedly to protect his body while he was out of it," says Whitmore. Former MSIA members charge that staffers who submitted to their leader's sexual advances were promoted to positions of authority and were praised by Hinkins for their spiritual qualities. Ex-MSIA member Victor Toso, said that although he was not homosexual, he consented to Hinkins's requests for sex because he feared being expelled from the MSIA staff. "Whenever we fell out of line, having another sexual encounter with him was sort of required to seal us back in the brotherhood," said Toso.

=== Intimidation ===
Wesley Whitmore, Wendell's twin brother and also former MSIA staffer, recalls that in "contrast to his public behavior, Hinkins in private was often angry, vindictive and bizarre, occasionally shouting that he was under attack from negative forces." He and his wife said that their devotion to Hinkins kept them from addressing these issues.

According to Susan Whitmore, MSIA defectors hesitated to challenge Hinkins publicly even after leaving the movement "because we were made to be afraid." She claims that Hinkins would declare that people who questioned him had placed themselves "under the Kal (a devil-like spirit) power and its field of negativity, known as the Red Monk," and would essentially be warning that members who associated with defectors risked spiritual disaster. The Whitmores allege that one woman was told she had had a miscarriage because she had hugged one of the defectors.

"The Red Monk...seemed to me to be a scare tactic to keep people from talking to each other," said David Welles, a chiropractor who worked at the John-Roger Foundation's holistic health center before leaving the movement in 1984.

The Whitmores also claim that after they left MSIA, their cars were vandalized, they received obscene letters accusing them of homosexuality, and phone calls in which threats were made on their lives. Similarly, Eve Cohen, the daughter of ex-MSIA ministers Matthew and Ellen Cohen, and at the time a teenager, received a letter graphically alleging that her father had had sexual acts with other men. The letter claimed to be from a friend of Eve's in Los Angeles.

Several other former MSIA members also claim to have been harassed during the time of the Red Monk scare: former Insight facilitator Jack Canfield and East Coast organizer Michael Bookbinder said they were subjected to threatening phone calls and bizarre, harassing letters. They believe that the calls and letters came from church insiders and, in certain cases, John-Roger himself.

Religion academic and writer David C. Lane claims that in the fall of 1983, after he called Hinkins, who at that time he considered to be a friend, to get his response to the allegations of plagiarism, sexual manipulation, and charlatanism that had been raised by other friends, he was subjected to a series of threats, including several made against his life and the lives of his friends/informants. His home was subsequently ransacked and a number of his research files were stolen. He claims that documentary evidence implicates John-Roger with the robbery, as well as with implementing a smear campaign including threats against Lane and other of his critics. This included setting up a front organization called the "Coalition for Civil and Spiritual Rights," an act which was eventually traced directly back to Hinkins.

=== Plagiarism ===
Claims of plagiarism have also been levied against Hinkins, in connection with both MSIA's core teachings and as other publications. Many of these have centered on the reportedly close similarity between certain MSIA materials and doctrine and that of Paul Twitchell's Eckankar, known prior to 1985 as "The Ancient Science of Soul Travel." One of the main allegers, religion academic David C. Lane, has published evidence that Hinkins took without attribution key spiritual teachings from Twitchell, who, Lane further claims, took them in turn from Radha Soami Satsang Beas, a movement with which Lane was at the time actively involved.

Hinkins, himself, admits that he had some level of involvement with the group: around the time of his surgery and religious experience, he had been exploring a variety of different spiritual teachings, and these explorations included Eckankar. Religion scholar James R. Lewis, in his book on Hinkins and MSIA, quotes a conversation in which Hinkins acknowledges that he studied with Eckankar, had a private interview with Twitchell, and received information from the group stating that he was an initiate, but denies being formally initiated into the group.

Nonetheless, side-by-side text comparisons of materials published by Lane appear to clearly show that Hinkins copied nearly verbatim, Twitchell's idiosyncratic cosmology (as found in Twitchell's 1971 The Spiritual Notebook) in his own 1976 publication The Sound Current. Hinkins also appears to have clearly plagiarized in his work Affirmations (1981) from Florence Scovel Shinn's book, The Game of Life and How to Play It (DeVorss & Company, 1925).

In 1994, Peter McWilliams, a former high-level member of MSIA, published Life 102: What to Do When Your Guru Sues You, which charged that Hinkins had repeatedly abused his power as a guru. McWilliams claimed, among other things, that he was the sole author of the highly successful Life 101 and several subsequent books purportedly coauthored by Hinkins (as "John-Roger"), who was his spiritual adviser and church leader at the time. Hinkins countered with a libel lawsuit. Ultimately, McWilliams agreed to abandon the copyright to Life 102: What to Do When Your Guru Sues You to Hinkins to settle the suit.

== Defense against cult charges ==
James R. Lewis, an academic who researches new religious movements, conducted a study of Hinkins and the Movement of Spiritual Inner Awareness. Lewis stated that he did not consider MSIA a cult. Lewis's book was published by Mandeville Press, the publishing organ of MSIA. Lewis has been accused by skeptical societies and anti-cult groups of serving as an apologist for several cults, including the Family and AUM Shinrikyo.

== Later life and death ==
Shortly after the publicized scandals that rocked MSIA during 1988 Hinkins announced that he had passed the "keys" to the Mystical Traveler Consciousness to protégé John Morton. He continued to participate in MSIA and PTS annual events until his death at the age of 80, on October 22, 2014, at his home in Los Angeles, California, from pneumonia.

== List of works ==
=== Books ===
- Divine Essence (Baraka) (1973) (1982) (2000) ISBN 978-1-893020-04-7
- The Spiritual Promise (1973) ISBN 978-0-914829-22-5
- Journey of a Soul (New Edition) (1975) (2000) (2001) ISBN 978-1-893020-13-9
- The Sound Current (1975) ISBN 0-914829-20-3
- Awakening Into Light (1976) ISBN 0-914829-00-9
- Buddha Consciousness (1976) ISBN 0-914829-03-3
- Consciousness of Wealth (1976) ISBN 0-914829-06-8
- The Dynamics of the Lower Self (1976) ISBN 0-914829-10-6
- Inner Worlds of Meditation (1976) ISBN 0-914829-11-4
- Manual on Using the Light (1976) ISBN 978-0-914829-13-3
- The Path to Mastership (1976) (1982) ISBN 978-0-914829-16-4
- The Power Within You (1976) (1984) ISBN 978-0-914829-24-9
- The Spiritual Family (1976) (1997) ISBN 978-0-914829-21-8
- Dream Voyages (1977) (1992) ISBN 978-0-914829-31-7
- Sex, Spirit & You (1977) (1985) (1987) (2000) ISBN 978-1-893020-03-0
- Music is the Message (1980) ISBN 0-914829-15-7
- The Way Out Book (1980) ISBN 978-0-914829-23-2
- Blessings of Light (1981) ISBN 978-0-88238-949-3
- The Signs of the Times (1981) ISBN 0-914829-19-X
- Passage Into Spirit (1984) (2000) ISBN 978-0-914829-25-6
- Relationships: Love, Marriage and Spirit (1986) (2000) ISBN 978-1-893020-05-4
- Wealth & Higher Consciousness (1988) ISBN 978-0-914829-51-5
- God Is Your Partner (New Edition) (1990) (2007) ISBN 978-1-893020-26-9
- Walking with the Lord (1991) ISBN 978-0-914829-30-0
- The Consciousness of a Soul (1993) ISBN 0-914829-94-7
- The Christ Within, Disciples of Christ with the Cosmic Christ Calendar (1994) ISBN 978-0-914829-35-5
- Forgiveness: The Key to the Kingdom (1994) ISBN 0-914829-34-3
- The Tao of Spirit (1994) ISBN 978-0-914829-33-1
- Psychic Protection (1997) ISBN 978-0-914829-69-0
- Loving Each Day (1998) (2000) ISBN 978-0-914829-26-3
- Spiritual Warrior: The Art of Spiritual Living (1998) ISBN 0-914829-36-X
- Interviews with John-Roger and John Morton (1999) ISBN 978-1-893020-01-6
- The Spiritual Family, Spanish Edition: La Familia Espiritual (1999) ISBN 0-914829-72-6
- Answers to Life's Questions (2000) ISBN 1-893020-07-X
- Loving Each Day for Moms and Dads (2001) ISBN 1-893020-09-6
- Loving Each Day for Peacemakers (2002) ISBN 1-893020-14-2
- Momentum: Letting Love Lead (with Dr. Paul Kaye) (2003) ISBN 978-1-893020-18-4
- When Are You Coming Home? (with Pauli Sanderson) (2003) ISBN 978-1-893020-23-8
- What's It Like Being You? (with Paul Kaye) (2004) ISBN 978-1-893020-25-2
- Spiritual High (New Edition) (2005) ISBN 978-1-893020-30-6
- Fulfilling The Spiritual Promise (2006) ISBN 978-1-893020-17-7
- Living Love from the Spiritual Heart (2006) ISBN 978-1-893020-32-0
- The Rest of Your Life: Finding Repose in the Beloved (with Paul Kaye) (2007) ISBN 978-1-893020-43-6
- Spiritual Warrior: The Art of Spiritual Living (New Edition) (2008) ISBN 978-1-893020-48-1
- Timeless Wisdoms: Volume 1 (2008) ISBN 978-1-893020-47-4
- Serving and Giving (2009) ISBN 978-1-893020-99-3
- Timeless Wisdoms: Volume 2 (2009) ISBN 978-1-893020-51-1
Books out of print
- The Cosmic Self
- Meditations for the Awakening Heart
- Q & A from the heart with John-Roger / Journal
- Spiritual Exercises: A Journal of Soul Transcendence
- Wisdoms of the Spiritual Heart
- We Give To Love

=== Audio ===
- The Anointed One, CD set (2006) ISBN 978-1-893020-39-9
- Health from the Inside Out, CD set (2006) ISBN 978-1-893020-40-5
- Inner Worlds of Meditation, CD (1998) ISBN 978-0-914829-64-5
- Inner Worlds of Meditation (incl. Master Chohan), CD set (1997) ISBN 978-0-914829-45-4
- Joyful Meditations, CD set (2005) ISBN 978-1-893020-37-5
- Living In Grace, CD set (2005) ISBN 978-1-893020-38-2
- Momentum, CD set (2005) ISBN 978-1-893020-41-2
- Money, The Great Mirror of Consciousness, CD set ISBN 978-1-893020-06-1
- Turning Points to Personal Liberation, CD set (2006) ISBN 978-1-893020-45-0

=== Video ===
- Journey To The East, DVD set
- Moments of Peace, Video (1999) ISBN 0-914829-60-2
- Spiritual Warriors Movie, DVD, UPC: 700261245539

== Related organizations founded by John-Roger ==
- Peace Theological Seminary & College of Philosophy (PTS)
- Institute for Individual and World Peace (IIWP)
- Insight Seminars
- Heartfelt Foundation
- Mandeville Press
