= Ancient Teachings of the Masters =

American religious group

- Abbreviation: ATOM
- Formation: 1983
- Founder: Darwin Gross
- Type: New religious movement
- Location: United States

Ancient Teaching of the Masters (ATOM) is an American religious group founded by Darwin Gross in 1983.

Darwin Gross was an American Army veteran, vibraphone musician, and religious leader. For ten years, he was idolised as the spiritual and corporate head of the “ECKANKAR” religion founded in 1965 by Paul Twitchell. Gross became “the 972nd Living ECK Master” in 1971 when Twitchell’s widow Gail handed him a blue carnation at an ECKANKAR corporate meeting. In 1981, Gross stepped down as spiritual head of ECKANKAR and appointed a follower, Harold Klemp, as “the 972nd Living ECK Master.” In 1983, Gross founded “Ancient Teaching of the Masters” (ATOM) after his expulsion from ECKANKAR by Klemp.

== Background ==
As followers would describe it, "Ancient Teaching of the Masters" is the name Darwin Gross used to carry on Paul Twitchell's original teachings after his termination from Eckankar.

Darwin Gross became the new Living Eck Master upon the death of Paul Twitchell in 1971. In 1981, he named Harold Klemp to take that position, continuing to function as the president of the Eckankar Corporation himself. In 1983, his relationship with Eckankar was formally terminated by Klemp, who formally terminated all of his agreements with the corporation and his status as an Eck Master, amid a cloud of charges of misappropriation of funds that were later sustained in court. His followers believe that the court transcript exonerates Gross from misappropriation of funds, that he never stole $400,000 as rumored among Eckists, and that frivolous lawsuits nearly destroyed his wealth.

At that time, Darwin Gross began teaching independently, clearly stating that he was not creating a separate teaching, but that he was maintaining the original teachings of Paul Twitchell.

Having retained copyright for all of his own books and music, Gross began publishing these works, and the works of his students, independently, under the SOS ("Sounds of Soul") Publishing label through 1989. Darwin Gross died on March 8, 2008. The current website https://atom.org/ draws on Paul Twitchell's teachings.
