= The Thorn (film) =

- VHS cover, c. 1984
- Directed by: Peter Alexander
- Written by: Peter Alexander
- Based on: New Testament by various authors
- Produced by: Peter Alexander
- Starring: John Hassberger; Bette Midler
- Cinematography: Paul Josephson
- Edited by: Peter Alexander
- Production company: Magnum Entertainment
- Distributed by: National Entertainment
- Release date: 1971 (Detroit)
- Running time: 93 minutes
- Country: United States
- Language: English

The Thorn (also known as The Greatest Story Overtold and The Divine Mr. J) is a 1971 American comedy film written, edited, directed and produced by Peter McWilliams (as Peter Alexander), and starring John Hassberger and Bette Midler. A religious satire, its release was legally challenged on grounds that its title and advertising deceptively exploited Midler's fame.

== Cast ==
- John Hassberger as Jesus Christ
- Bette Midler as the Virgin Mary
- James Harrison as Joseph
- John Greenburg as John the Baptist
- Fred LaBour as the Angel Fred
- Richard Pollard as Rabbi Gabriel
- Diana David as Salome
- Jack Castor and Chi Chi as queens

All of these actors were unknown and had no other film credits, with the exception of Midler, who was just beginning to build her singing career, had acted in a Broadway musical, and had briefly played a lead role in the off-Broadway musical Salvation in 1969. Midler had a brief appearance as a boat passenger in the 1966 film Hawaii.

== Production ==
=== Development ===
Originally conceived as The Greatest Story Overtold, an irreverent spoof of the 1965 epic film The Greatest Story Ever Told, the project was influenced by the increase in popularity and profitability of Christian evangelism. Peter McWilliams wrote, produced, directed and edited the film under the pseudonym Peter Alexander. He went on to write a broad range of mostly self-published, popular books.

=== Filming ===
Shot in 16mm on a shoestring budget, the crew included Paul Josephson on camera and lighting, Craig Reynolds and Jay Cassidy on camera, and Jon Duff on sound recording. Filming primarily took place in a suburb of Detroit, Michigan from 1970 to 1971.

== Release, marketing and legal challenge ==
Poster for premiere showing on 1974 May 24 in New York City

After premiering in Detroit, The Thorn remained underground until it was released by National Entertainment Corp. as The Divine Mr. J a few years later, to capitalize on Midler's growing fame as "The Divine Miss M". The premiere showing under the new title at the Festival Theater in New York City on May 24, 1974, was picketed by Midler's agent, who also challenged the film's title and marketing in court. The film received very poor reviews and soon closed.

The Divine Mr. J was re-released by Rochelle Films, Inc. in 1980 after Midler's starring role in The Rose.

== See also ==
- List of American films of 1974
- List of films banned in the United States
