= Webster's Third New International Dictionary =

American English dictionary

- Language: English
- Genre: Dictionary
- Published: 1961
- Preceded by: Webster's New International Dictionary (second edition, 1934)

Webster's Third New International Dictionary of the English Language, Unabridged (also known as Webster's Third, or W3) is an American English-language dictionary published in September 1961. It was edited by Philip Babcock Gove and a team of lexicographers who spent 757 editor-years and $3.5 million. The most recent printing has 2,816 pages, and as of 2005, it contained more than 476,000 vocabulary entries (including more than 100,000 new entries and as many new senses for entries carried over from previous editions), 500,000 definitions, 140,000 etymologies, 200,000 verbal illustrations, 350,000 example sentences, 3,000 pictorial illustrations and an 18,000-word Addenda section.

The final definition, Zyzzogeton, was written on October 17, 1960; the final etymology was recorded on October 26; and the final pronunciation was transcribed on November 9. The final copy went to the typesetters, R. R. Donnelley, on December 2. The book was printed by the Riverside Press in Cambridge, Massachusetts. The first edition had 2,726 pages (measuring 9 in or 230 mm wide by 13 in or 330 mm tall by 3 in or 76 mm thick), weighed 13 1/2 lb (6.1 kg), and originally sold for $47.50 ($512 in 2025 dollars). The changes were the most radical in the history of the Unabridged.

The dictionary became part of a controversy in the 1960s between advocates of linguistic prescriptivism and linguistic descriptivism. The third edition was more descriptivist than the second edition, acknowledging the existence of non-standard forms without necessarily calling them invalid or improper; this attracted criticism from prescriptivists who believed that the dictionary was abandoning its duty to set a standard of proper English.

== Deletions ==
Prior to Webster's Third the Unabridged had been expanded with each new edition, with minimal deletion. To make room for 100,000 new words, Gove now made sweeping deletions, dropping 250,000 entries. He eliminated the "nonlexical matter" that he felt belonged in an encyclopedia, including all names of people and places (which had filled two appendices). There were no more mythological, biblical, and fictional names, nor the names of buildings, historical events, or art works. Thirty picture plates were dropped. The rationale was that, while useful, these are not strictly about language. Gove justified the change by the company's publication of Webster's Biographical Dictionary in 1943 and Webster's Geographical Dictionary in 1949, and the fact that the topics removed could be found in encyclopedias.

Also removed were words which had been virtually out of use for more than two hundred years (except those found in major literature such as Shakespeare), rare variants, reformed spellings, self-explanatory combination words, and other items considered of little value to the general reader. The number of small text illustrations was reduced, page size increased, and print size reduced by one-twelfth, from six point to agate (5.5 point) type. All this was considered necessary because of the large amount of new material, and Webster's Second had almost reached the limits of mechanical bookbinding. The fact that the new book had about 700 fewer pages was justified by the need to allow room for future additions.

In style and method, the dictionary bore little resemblance to earlier editions. Headwords (except for "God", acronyms pronounced as a string of letters, and, in the reprints, trademarks) were not capitalized. Instead of capitalizing "American", for example, the dictionary had labels next to the entries reading cap (for the noun) and usu cap (for the adjective). This allowed informative distinctions to be drawn: "gallic" is usu cap while "gallicism" is often cap and "gallicize" is sometimes cap.

== Reception and criticisms ==
The reviews of the Third edition were highly favorable in Britain.

Robert Chapman, a lexicographer, canvassed fellow lexicographers at Funk & Wagnalls, who had used the new edition daily for three years. The consensus held that the Third was a "marvelous achievement, a monument of scholarship and accuracy". They did come up with some specific criticisms, including typographic unattractiveness (they claimed the type is too small and hard to read); non-use of capital letters (only "God" is capitalized; the goal was to save space); excessive use of citations, giving misspellings as legitimate variants, dropping too many obsolete words, the lack of usage labels, and deliberate omission of biographical and geographical entries. Chapman concluded that the "cranks and intransigents who advise us to hang on to the NID 2 are plain fools who deny themselves the riches of a great book".

This dictionary became preferred as a backup source by two influential style guides in the United States, although each one directs writers to go first to other, shorter dictionaries. The Chicago Manual of Style, followed by many book publishers and magazines in the United States, recommends Webster's Third, along with Merriam-Webster's Collegiate Dictionary for "general matters of spelling", and the style book "normally opts for" the first spelling listed (with the Collegiate taking precedence over Webster's Third because it "represents the latest research"). The Associated Press Stylebook, used by most newspapers in the United States, refers readers to W3 "if there is no listing in either this book or Webster's New World".

=== Permissiveness ===
In the early 1960s, Webster's Third came under attack for its "permissiveness" and its failure to tell people what proper English was. It was an early conflict in the culture wars, as conservatives detected yet another symbol of the permissiveness of society as a whole, and the decline of authority represented by the Second Edition. As historian Herbert Morton explained, "Webster's Second was more than respected. It was accepted as the ultimate authority on meaning and usage and its preeminence was virtually unchallenged in the United States. It did not provoke controversies, it settled them." Critics charged that Webster's Third was reluctant to defend standard English, for example eliminating the labels "colloquial", "correct", "incorrect", "proper", "improper", "erroneous", "humorous", "jocular", "poetic", and "contemptuous", among others.

Gove's stance was an exemplar of descriptivist linguistics: describing language as it is or has been used. As David M. Glixon put it in the Saturday Review: "Having descended from God's throne of supreme authority, the Merriam folks are now seated around the city desk, recording like mad." Jacques Barzun said this stance made Webster's Third "the longest political pamphlet ever put together by a party", done with "a dogma that far transcends the limits of lexicography".

In 1962, two professors of English James Sledd (Northwestern) and Wilma R. Ebbitt (University of Chicago), published a "casebook" that compiles more than sixty lay and expert contributions to this controversy. In it, Sledd was drawn into debate with Dwight Macdonald, one of the most prominent critics of the dictionary, who in the pages of The New Yorker (March 10, 1962) had accused its makers of having "untuned the string, made a sop of the solid structure of English"; Macdonald held that the dictionary was an important indicator of "the changes in our cultural climate".

=== Treatment of the contraction 'Ain't' ===
The dictionary's treatment of 'ain't' was subject to particular scorn, since it replaced the previous entry listing the term as "illiterate" with one merely regarding it as nonstandard. The entry for "ain't" seemed to condone its use, saying "though disapproved by many and more common in less educated speech, used orally in most parts of the U. S. by many cultivated speakers esp. in the phrase ain't I". The Globe and Mail of Toronto editorialized: "a dictionary's embrace of the word 'ain't' will comfort the ignorant, confer approval upon the mediocre, and subtly imply that proper English is the tool of only the snob". The New York Times editorialized that "Webster's has, it is apparent, surrendered to the permissive school that has been busily extending its beachhead in English instruction in the schools ... reinforced the notion that good English is whatever is popular" and "can only accelerate the deterioration" of the English language. The Times' widely respected Theodore M. Bernstein, its in-house style authority and a professor of journalism at Columbia University, reported that most of the newspaper's editors decided to continue to use the Webster's Second. Garry Wills in the National Review opined that the new dictionary "has all the modern virtues. It is big, expensive, and ugly. It should be a great success." The New Yorker referenced the controversy with a cartoon by Alan Dunn showing a receptionist at the dictionary's office telling a visitor "Sorry. Dr. Gove ain't in."

Criticism of the dictionary spurred the creation of The American Heritage Dictionary of the English Language, where 500 usage notes were determined by a panel of expert writers. The editor, however, often ignored their advice.

== Revisions and updates ==
Since the 1961 publication of the Third, Merriam-Webster has reprinted the main text of the dictionary with only minor corrections. To add new words, they created an Addenda Section in 1966, included in the front matter, which was expanded in 1971, 1976, 1981, 1986, 1993, and 2002. However, the rate of additions has been much slower than it had been throughout the previous hundred years.

Following the purchase of Merriam-Webster by Encyclopædia Britannica, Inc. in 1964, a three-volume version was issued for many years as a supplement to the encyclopedia. At the end of volume three, this edition included the Britannica World Language Dictionary, 474 pages of translations between English and French, German, Italian, Spanish, Swedish, and Yiddish.

A CD-ROM version incorporating the full text and the addenda in a single alphabetical list was published in 2000. It was included with print editions. This was later replaced with a subscription-based website, now called Merriam-WebsterUnabridged.com, that receives periodic updates.
