= List of films banned in the United States =

This is a list of films that are or have at one point been banned from release or showing in the United States; including films banned in specific American cities or states. This also includes cartoons, television specials, and films banned from being aired on television.

== List ==
Film	Release date	Date(s) banned	Reason
Stag films	1896-1930	1934-1970s	Banned during the Hays Office Code for the obscene nature in these films, despite their being shown only in private parties.
All Mabel Normand films	1910-1927	1924	On January 9, 1924, the entire state of Michigan temporarily banned all films starring Mabel Normand following the shooting of Courtland Dines, a wealthy oilman from Denver, that was led by Normand's chauffeur that sparked national headlines.
All Charlie Chaplin films	1914-1952	1940s-1956	Memphis, Tennessee's longtime board chief Lloyd T. Binford had a history of banning every Charlie Chaplin movie due to his objection to the popular actor's private life. However throughout time, the Memphis area outside of the city screened his movies without a single warning. A few examples include the 1952 film Limelight being screened in neighboring West Memphis, Arkansas to avoid Binford's reaction. And on May 2, 1954, the First Unitarian Church in Memphis screened one of Chaplin's silent movies to a test audience with a capacity of 100 people. Binford replied that the church would "violate the law" if they screened the 1915 movie A Burlesque on Carmen. They did, the audience enjoyed it with heavy laughter, and there was nothing "morally" wrong with the picture.: All of Chaplin's films were also banned for several years in Lynn, Massachusetts in January 1927 by the city's mayor, Ralph S. Bauer, saying that the ban was "made necessary by the charges made by Lita Grey in her divorce action".
Three Weeks	1914	1915	Banned in Charleston, West Virginia due to immoral behavioral content.
A Woman	1915	1915	The Charlie Chaplin film was banned in Los Angeles on July 13 by film censors. Police were then ordered to seize all films being exhibited that afternoon.
The Birth of a Nation	1915	1915–1939	Banned in several American cities for its racist content and portrayal of the Ku Klux Klan, including Chicago, Las Vegas, Denver, Minneapolis, Boston, Pittsburgh, and St. Louis, and the states of Ohio, Kansas, and West Virginia, as well as "dozens" of other jurisdictions. Unbanned in 1916 outside of Kansas. Two dozen years after the film's release on April 20, 1939, the city of Milwaukee banned the movie by Otto R. Hauser, the secretary for mayor Daniel Hoan, because of the same reasons, calling the film "historically untrue".
Purity	1916	1916	Banned in the state of Kansas, and several other cities across America including Dallas, Kansas City, Jackson, MS and Washington, D.C., due to nudity.
Birth Control	1917	1917	Produced by and starring Margaret Sanger; banned, with the New York Court of Appeals holding that a film on family planning work may be censored "in the interest of morality, decency, and public safety and welfare".
The Little American	1917	July–August 1917	The Chicago Board of Censors initially blocked exhibition of the film in Chicago, describing the movie as anti-German and suggesting that showing it could start a riot. Artcraft challenged the Board in state court and, after a jury trial, the refusal of the board to issue a permit despite a court order, and the denial of a second appeal by the board, won the right to show the film in Chicago.
Häxan	1922	1922–1929	Banned until 1929 due to the inclusion of torture and nudity. Its themes of witchcraft and Satanism may also have been a factor in the ban.
A Woman of Paris	1923	1923	Pennsylvania censors banned the Charlie Chaplin film in the entirety of the Keystone State because of its content, calling the film both "indecent and immoral".
Babe Comes Home	1927	1927	Briefly banned in portions of the Chicago Metropolitan Area due to scenes of Babe Ruth chewing tobacco and spitting in the film. Mrs. Albert L. Stevenson, a film censor member, later recommended that "the censors do not believe that there is an inherent virtue in chewing tobacco and don't wish the children in Highland Park to believe that one must chew to achieve fame." The ban was later lifted.
The Road to Ruin	1928	1928	Banned in Stockton, California due to its content.
The Big House	1930	1930	Banned in the entire state of Ohio as both "racketeering and gangland" by the Ohio Board of Film Censors.
Party Girl	1930	1930	Though passed for theatrical screening, several cities banned the film due to its depiction of prostitution, namely Birmingham, Alabama.
No Limit	1931	1931	Banned in Riverside, California by the city's censor boards due to "notoriety", as its star, Clara Bow, was at that time present in the trial of Daisy DeBoe, a former secretary of hers who had been charged with grand theft auto in Los Angeles.
11 Warner Bros. short films	1931-1944	Since 1968	11 animated short films produced by Warner Bros. under the Looney Tunes and Merrie Melodies labels, including Hittin' the Trail for Hallelujah Land, Uncle Tom's Bungalow, and Coal Black and de Sebben Dwarfs, were removed from broadcast syndication in response to the Civil Rights Movement; they are often collectively referred to as the Censored Eleven. While these shorts have never been aired on television since their removal and have never received an official home media or streaming release, a few of these short films have since fallen into the public domain and have been uploaded to file sharing sites and video-sharing platforms like YouTube by members of the public.
Some Betty Boop short films	1931-1934	1935-1972	Some of the pre-Code cartoons featuring Betty Boop, including The Old Man of the Mountain and Is My Palm Read, were withdrawn during the Hays Code restrictions for their sexually suggestive content.
Scarface	1932	1932	Banned in five states and five other cities due to "glorification of crime."
Ecstasy	1933	1933–1937	Banned in the US from 1933 to 1937 due to its erotic content.
8 Popeye the Sailor short films	1933-1952	Since the Early 1990s	A total of eight short films in the series, all dating from the World War II era, had been banned from appearing on television for containing propagandistic stereotypes, particularly in regards to the Japanese people, that may be perceived as insensitive to contemporary audiences. Some of the short films, like Spinach Fer Britain, Seein' Red, White 'N' Blue, and Wigwam Whoopee, were seen on the anthology series The Popeye Show on Adult Swim in the early 2000s. One of them briefly appeared on Boomerang before being removed for its potentially offensive stereotyping and other inappropriate themes.
Tomorrow's Children	1934	1934-1938	The entire states of Virginia and Kansas first banned the film, and later by New York in March 1938 due to its content which describes the film as "immoral and tending to incite crime and corrupt public morals".
G Men	1935	1935	The State of Illinois Board of Censors banned one of the top-grossing films of 1935 in Chicago due to its depiction of the trapping of John Dillinger, which the censor felt might've made children "too excited".
The Amateur Fire Brigade: A Parable of the New Deal	1935	1936	On February 11, 1936, the State of Ohio banned the anti-New Deal cartoon by Ted Eshbaugh after its request by the state's censor due to its content that seeks to arouse passions, emotions, and prejudice, and encourages disrespect for the office of then-President Franklin D. Roosevelt.
Spain in Flames	1937	1937	The compilation film/newsreel was banned in a few states including Ohio and Pennsylvania, and multiple cities across the country including New Brunswick, New Jersey, Waterbury, Connecticut, and Provincetown, Massachusetts, due to the film's plot being reported as "harmful and tortured."
We Who Are About to Die	1937	1937	The RKO film was banned in Orlando, Florida shortly after its release due to protests over the film being "morbid" and exhibited undue sympathy for the criminal element.
Inside Nazi Germany	1938	1938	The March Of Time documentary was banned in Chicago because of its content. The Warner Brothers Circuit Management Corporation chain also refused to screen the film in their theaters.
Professor Mamlock	1938	1938	The Soviet drama film was banned all across Ohio because of the film's plot.
The Birth of a Baby	1938	Since 1938	Banned all across Pennsylvania by the state's Motion Picture Censors, in New York City by the state of New York's censors, and in Cincinnati, Ohio by the city's manager Clarence O. Sherrill due to the film being reported as "non-educational" and as it lacked certification by the state's Board of Motion Pictures Censors. The Cincinnati Police Department's chief Eugene T. Weatherly later viewed the film and described the picture as "positively terrible."
All Dr. Kildare films	1938-1947	1942	Balaban and Katz, Chicago's largest theater chain at the time, and the Great States Theatres chain banned all films starring popular medical doctor Dr. Kildare from their 100 movie theaters across Illinois because of Lew Ayres' behavioral issues. The ban took place after he left Hollywood to visit an Oregon camp in March 1942.
Gone with the Wind	1939	2020	Briefly removed from HBO Max in response of the 2020 Minnesota protests.
Hitler – Beast of Berlin	1939	1939	The State of New York banned this notorious film from World War II as it was "found to be inhuman, sacrilegious, and tended to incite to crime".
Yes, My Darling Daughter	1939	1939	The Motion Picture Division of New York State Education Department briefly banned the Warner Brothers movie in New York due to the film's description and role failure. The New York State Board of Censors immediately got into big arguments toward the state's Department Of Education shortly after its ban. Censors replied that it could be "absolutely" okay and approved to be sent to theaters across the state, but some New York State Censors believed that it may set a "dangerous example".
The Ramparts We Watch	1940	1940	The March Of Time documentary was briefly banned all across Pennsylvania due to portions of the film being termed as "part of the fear propaganda being disseminated by Germany", which demonstrates scenes on the German invasion of Poland and clips from the German film "Baptism of Fire".
Strange Cargo	1940	1940	Banned in Detroit by Frank D. Eaman and Charles W. Snyder of the Detroit Police Department because it was said to have "a general spirit that is contrary to certain religious ideas."
Fight for Life	1940	1940	The federal government's film about dealing with child and maternal welfare was banned in Chicago due to its depiction of subjects that the city's board found unfit for public exhibition.
Pastor Hall	1940	1940	The Chicago Police Department banned the British drama film based on the life of German Evangelical Lutheran clergyman Martin Niemöller due to the film's plot and "exceedingly controversial nature".
Two-Faced Woman	1941	1941	This film's theme (adultery) caused it to be banned in New York City, among other places.
Scrub Me Mama with a Boogie Beat	1941	Since 1949	Banned after the 1948 reissue for the excessive racist content as Walter Lantz stated that he would never distribute the short film on television.
12 Bugs Bunny short films	1941-1960	Since 2001	Dozen Bugs Bunny cartoons were withdrawn from broadcast; they were perceived as being "politically incorrect". Collectively dubbed "The Twelve Missing Hares" in reference to the name of a Toonheads episode intended to air during the marathon, but was also pulled. The short All This and Rabbit Stew was already banned since 1968 as part of the Censored Eleven. Subsequent releases of these shorts were limited to collectable DVD sets.
Ossessione	1943	1943–1976	Banned in the US for 33 years because the plot was based on James M. Cain's novel The Postman Always Rings Twice to which MGM owned the rights. It took until 1976 before copyright issues were resolved.
Red Hot Riding Hood	1943	Before 1984	Red Hot Riding Hood and all other short films featuring Red were not allowed to be broadcast on television due to the restrictions of the television code, which indicated that the character's scantily clad suggestiveness would not be appropriate for children. The description of the front VHS cover of Cartoons for Big Kids from 1989 stated that the films featuring Red were indeed "banned from television".
The Burning Question, Mom and Dad, No Orchids For Miss Blandish, Without Pity, Woman Of Antwep, Gigi (1949 French version), She Shoulda Said No!, and The Paris Waltz (along with 11 other films)	1943-1950	Since 1949-1952	Sydney R. Traub of the Maryland State Board of Motion Picture Censors took over as the main chairman on May 2, 1949. Under his tenure, the board banned a total of 19 films in the state between May 1949 and March 1952. Almost all of the films he banned depicted hetero- and homosexual relationships, sexual content, drug addiction, nudity, racial invasions, extreme violence, and pregnancy. Several of the banned features were unlisted. Another film, On Polish Ground, was banned for reasons other than sex or narcotics. The board claimed that the documentary's representation of Poland in World War II was "false and fraudulent".: She Shoulda Said No was also banned across all of Pennsylvania in August 1953 for similar reasons by state censors, calling the film "immoral, indecent, not proper, and tends to both corrupt and debase moral".
Bugs Bunny Nips the Nips	1944	Since 1995	Withdrawn from circulation due to its perceived racial stereotypes. It had been included on the Golden Age of Looney Tunes Laserdisc set; three years after its portion of that set was reissued on VHS as part of the compilation Bugs Bunny by Each Director, a viewer, Michael Sawamura, complained to the Sacramento chapter of the Japanese American Citizens League after seeing it appear on the cassette without any text or narration notifying about the racist content. This led to the tape getting recalled; it was eventually reedited to replace that cartoon with Racketeer Rabbit, which had appeared on a similar set.
Western Approaches	1944	1944	The Hays Code banned the British film for "mild profanity", but the British Film Office responded with an angry note to the Hays Code that December, replying that they've been "unnecessary prudish" in banning the film despite being "shot at sea with merchant navy men playing in all parts".
Wilson and Heavenly Days	1944	1944	Both the Woodrow Wilson biographical film and the RKO film starring legendary radio comedians Fibber McGee and Molly were briefly banned by the War Department due to both films containing material that was construed as violating provisions of the Soldier Voting Act.
We Accuse	1945	1945	A documentary story about the Kharkiv war criminal trials, banned by the Hays Code due to many concerns and complaints about pictures of Nazi atrocities, as well as the word "damned" being used.
Brewster's Millions	1945	1945	Banned in Memphis, Tennessee, due to Brewster's African-American servant was treated too well.
Dillinger & Dead End	1945/1937	1945	Both films (including the 1945 reissue of Dead End) were banned in Memphis by Lloyd T. Binford and his censors due to both features being conducive to crime.
The Southerner	1945	1945	Banned in Memphis by censors due to the film being reported as "giving the nation the wrong idea about the South".
Scarlet Street	1945	1946	On January 4, 1946, the New York State Censor Board banned Scarlet Street, relying on the statute that gave it the power to censor films that were "obscene, indecent, immoral, inhuman, sacrilegious" or whose exhibition "would tend to corrupt morals or incite to crime." One week later, the Motion Picture Commission for the city of Milwaukee also banned the film by the chief of the Milwaukee Police Department as part of a new policy encouraged by police for "stricter regulation of undesirable films." On February 3, Christina Smith, the city censor of Atlanta, argued that because of "the sordid life it portrayed, the treatment of illicit love, the failure of the characters to receive orthodox punishment from the Atlanta Police Department, and because the picture would tend to weaken a respect for the law," Scarlet Street was "licentious, profane, obscure and contrary to the good order of the community." ... Universal was discouraged from challenging the constitutionality of the censors by the protests of the national religious groups that arose as the Atlanta case went to court.
Duel in the Sun	1946	1947	Banned in Memphis due to the film's plot being reported as "mature throughout the film". Lloyd T. Binford said in a statement that it started with "two murders, then a rape, then a train wreck, and ended with two murders".
The Martins and the Coys	1946	Since 1988	The first segment in Make Mine Music is withdrawn from the film for the depictions of gun violence that were deemed unsuitable for children. Disney has since refused to release the film with this particular segment intact, even by request.
Curley	1947	1947	Banned in Memphis by Lloyd T. Binford. He wrote a letter to distributor United Artists saying that "'[the board] was unable to approve your 'Curley' picture with the little Negroes as the south does not permit Negroes in white schools nor recognize social equality between the races, even in children.'".
Forever Amber	1947	1947	Despite being passed in Memphis, the city of Grand Rapids, Michigan banned the movie by members of the Grand Rapids Better Movies council because of its content, with its past president of the council calling the film "a glorification of sin", "trash" and "unfitting". The ban came right after the city's Eastown Theatre screened the trailer of the movie with 250 members of the board attending the screening.
Uncle Tom's Cabaña	1947	1990s	Banned after the 1990s for the excessive racist content. However, it made a limited release on laserdisc in 1993 before putting it in obscurity indefinitely.
Bicycle Thieves	1948	1950	The Italian prize-winning movie was banned all over the United States by MPAA in March 1950 due to the use of urination by a little boy and disturbing culture including scenes from inside of a bordello.
Drug Addict	1948	Since 1948	The 34-minute National Film Board of Canada documentary by Robert Anderson was banned by Federal Bureau of Narcotics commissioner Harry J. Anslinger because its clear illustration of drug addiction as an illness was diametrically opposed to his policies. Anslinger went as far as to formally request that the Canadian government ban the film within its own borders; the request was refused. Technically, 'Drug Addict' remains banned.
Mouse Cleaning and Casanova Cat	1948, 1951	2004–2025	Two Tom and Jerry short films were banned from subsequent releases for their offensive blackface imagery. Warner Bros. Discovery lifted the ban 21 years later.
The Miracle	1948	1950–1952	The second part of the Italian film "L'Amore" (or "Love" in English) was banned all over the United States, as it was condemned by the National Legion of Decency, which termed the part as "anti-Catholic" and "sacrilegious". Shortly afterward in the middle of February 1951, the State of New York revoked the license to show the film from the state's Board of Regents. The ban led to the law's Joseph Burstyn, Inc. v. Wilson which led to a decision by Supreme Court in 1952 that the film was a form of artistic expression and was protected by the First Amendment.
A Song Is Born	1948	1948	Banned in Memphis due to both its plot and racial content, which also featured scenes of both whites and negroes dancing together.
Rope	1948	1948	The Alfred Hitchcock movie starring James Stewart was banned in Seattle by a censor board chairman depicting that the film appearing to not be proper enough for younger audiences. The Naval Support Activity Mid-South also canceled the movie run halfway through for similar reasons.
Lost Boundaries	1949	1949	Banned in Atlanta and Memphis; liable to "create dissension and strife between members of the white and colored races, and would be likely to cause disorders, disturbances, and clashes between the races."
Bitter Rice	1949	1951	Exactly 11 months after the ban of Bicycle Thieves and The Miracle, police crackdowns and bitter Catholic oppositions led the state of New York censors to ban a third Italian film, Bitter Rice.
Kiss Tomorrow Goodbye	1950	1950	The film was banned in Ohio as "a sordid, sadistic presentation of brutality and an extreme presentation of crime with explicit steps in commission."
Stromboli	1950	1950	The Syndicate Theaters Circuit chain that served 320 Indiana movie theaters at the time of the film's release banned the RKO movie in the Hoosier State exactly one week before the film's release because Ingrid Bergman was part of the cast, and the Allied Theater Owners of Indiana replied by mail that she was discredited and failed to discipline errant stars. The Interstate Theatres chain of Dallas also refused to screen the movie to their 175 movie theaters across the south.
Domenica	1952	1955	The French film directed by Maurice Cloche was banned in San Francisco for containing nude sequences.
Cease Fire	1953	1953	The Korean War film was banned all over the United States for a brief time due to the terms "hell" and "damn" being heard in the dialogue.
The Moon Is Blue	1953	1953	Banned in Jersey City, New Jersey, and by all armed forces for being "indecent and obscene."
From Here to Eternity	1953	1953	The U.S. Navy banned the film due to the Navy considering the it as "derogatory to a sister service". Meanwhile, the U.S. Army refused to have its own ban, which lead the members of the Army-Air Force motion picture board to approve the film. This is despite the Navy motion picture exchange usually doing censoring jobs for both the Navy and Marine Corps. A scheduled showing was planned by the Navy, but was turned down.
The Vanishing Prairie	1954	1954	The Walt Disney documentary was banned in New York on August 10, 1954 due to it containing a clip of a buffalo giving birth. The ban was lifted after the American Civil Liberties Union filed a complaint against the local censor.
The French Line	1954	1954	On March 3, 1954, the Chicago Police Department's Commissioner banned the Jane Russell movie in Chicago due to contrary to public morals and described the film as harmful to children. Four months later, the film was banned in Lynn, Massachusetts by the city's mayor after its premiere at the city's Capitol Theatre because of its content. The owner of the theater was one of the attendees of the premiere before immediately calling the mayor on the phone afterward. The manager eventually pulled it off after its second showing. As requested, the manager replaced it with a double feature of Hondo and The Scarlet Spear as a replacement.
The Bamboo Prison	1954	1955	The Korean War film was banned in Memphis due to its "inimical" content.
Game of Love (1954 French version)	1954	1956	Banned in Milwaukee, Wisconsin as pornography.
A Song of Love	1954	1966	Banned in the entire state of California for containing hardcore pornography.
All Speedy Gonzales shorts	1955-1969	1985-1986, 1999-2002	Right after the longtime The Bugs Bunny/Road Runner Show's departure from CBS and return to ABC at the start of the 1985-1986 season as The Bugs Bunny/Looney Tunes Comedy Hour, all shorts that starred Speedy Gonzales were banned from the program because of Mexican stereotypes. The move was undertaken before the program relaunched as The Bugs Bunny and Tweety Show, which introduced the Tweety shorts that were omitted from the previous package for unknown reasons. In 1999, Cartoon Network banned all of Speedy's shorts for similar reasons, but following a grass-roots campaign in part of Hispanic groups, the cable network lifted its ban on these shorts in July 2002.
Lady Chatterley's Lover (1955 French version)	1955	1955	Banned in both New York and New York City because of its "adultery promotion".
Blackboard Jungle	1955	1955	Banned across Georgia because of "politically incorrect content", including scenes of desegregated classrooms. Shortly after its ban, staff at The Atlanta Constitution filed a suit against the censors and took the case to Supreme Court in an attempt to lift the ban.
Baby Doll	1956	1956–1957	Banned in Memphis, Nashville, and Atlanta due to the film plot's culture, which a member of the Memphis Board determined as "immoral." It was the first picture to be banned after the death of Memphis censor chief Lloyd T. Binford, whose death became national headlines. The film was intended to be exhibited in Nashville (via the Tennessee Theatre) in January 1957, but was banned by its local censor from being shown within the city; as such, the film ended up being booked for three drive-in theaters within Davidson County.: A total of 20 movie theaters in Vermont, New Hampshire, and Maine operated by the New Hampshire & Maine Theatres also banned the movie for the same reason. In April 1957, three Long Island based movie theater chains also banned the movie from their theaters for the same reasons, including the Associated Prudential Theaters Incorporated and Skouras Theatres chains.
And God Created Woman (1956 French version)	1956	1958	Banned in both Dallas and Philadelphia because of its content.
Portland Exposé	1957	1957	The film was banned regionally by local agencies in the Pacific Northwest, particularly in Portland, Oregon—its setting—due to its depiction of crimes inspired by those committed by crime boss Jim Elkins.
The Immoral Mr. Teas	1959	1962–1963	Banned in Baltimore (along with two other films) for a 12-month hiatus by Maryland's State Of Board Censors on November 8, 1962 due to its sexually explicit content.
Hideout in the Sun	1960	1960	Banned in Memphis by the Board of Censors shortly after the film's release in February 1960 due to nudity.
Operation Abolition and Communism On The Map	1960	1961	The Michigan State Police banned both anti-Communist films in all of Michigan because of its content.
Victim	1961	1961	Banned due to the on-screen use of the phrase "homosexual".
Naughty New Orleans	1962	1963	An exploitation film on downtown New Orleans was banned in Memphis by the Board of Censors in May 1963. The censor, Minter Somerville Hooker, did not view the film as obscene but said she banned it anyway.
Flaming Creatures	1963	1964	Banned in New York City because of sexual content.
Promises! Promises!	1963	1963	Banned in Cleveland by the Cleveland Division Of Police, Pittsburgh by the Pittsburgh Police, and several other cities due to explicit nude scenes, though later the Cleveland court decided the nude scenes in the film were not lewd after all. The ban took place a few weeks prior to the assassination of John F. Kennedy.
My Bare Lady	1963	1963	The 64-minute British exploitation film (along with one other exploitation film) was banned in Pittsburgh by the Pittsburgh Police due to its content shortly days after Pittsburgh's ban on Promises! Promises! The ban came before the arrest of two Cameraphone Theatre (East Liberty) owners after complaints from showing the film three days prior to Kennedy's assassination.
John Goldfarb, Please Come Home!	1964	1964–1965	The Notre Dame-based film (along with the book from which it was adapted) was banned in New York by a judge due to the main characters depicted as "drunken party boys" before the film premiered around Christmas 1964 in selected 200+ theaters. Supreme Court Justice Henry Clay Greenburg called the situation "ugly, vulgar, and tawdry."
Viva Maria!	1965	1966–1968	Banned in Dallas for sexual and anti-Catholic content, prior to the United States Supreme Court striking down the ban and limiting the ability of municipalities to ban films for adults in Interstate Circuit, Inc. v. City of Dallas.
I, a Woman	1965	1966	Banned in the town of Mendota, Illinois because of its content.
Chelsea Girls	1966	1967	Banned in Boston because of its content.
Guess Who's Coming to Dinner	1967	February 1968	On February 8, 1968, the city of Cleveland briefly banned one of the top-grossing movies of 1967 following three Cleveland area movie theaters becoming victims of stink bombs. Following the incident, authorities recovered suspicious packages of two plastic bottles of "foul-smelling fluid", which led to moviegoers in the Hippodrome Theater alongside two other theaters in Bedford and Rocky River being forced to evacuate. The ban was lifted shortly afterward.
The Fox	1967	1968	The town of Mendota, Illinois banned the Warner Bros.-Seven Arts movie because of its mayor describing the film as "indecent and not morally fit for anyone".
Titicut Follies	1967	1968–1991	Banned from distribution in Massachusetts to the general public by court order because the film was considered a violation of the privacy of the prison inmates it filmed.
I Am Curious (Yellow)	1967	1969	Banned as pornography. After three court cases, the ban was lifted when the anti-obscenity laws concerning films were overturned.
Injun Trouble	1969	since 1970s	Banned for the excessive racist content after the 1970s, it remains unavailable to this day.
The Minx	1970	1970	Banned in Lafayette, Louisiana by judge because of its content. Judge Jerome Domengeaux ordered the ban and called the film "plain stupid stag film garbage". The ban of the movie also caused one movie theater, the Lafayette Cinema Center, to be forced to stop running the movie or forfeit $5,000 bond to the theater.
Some Jane Fonda films	1971-2013	2005-2022	Isaac "Ike" Boutwell, a pilot trainer in the Vietnam War who would later become a Kentucky movie theater owner, banned some Jane Fonda movies in his home county of Hardin County, Kentucky, including Klute, Monster-in-Law, and The Butler, because of the activist role Fonda took during the war. The ban was lifted in June 2022 following his death.
Bless the Beasts and Children	1971	1971	Employees at Brigham Young University banned the wildlife movie across their campus in Provo, Utah despite its GP-rating because employees called the content of the film "too real for our people".
Death of a Legend	1971	1973	The 49-minute Audubon Society-sponsored Canadian documentary about the remaining wolves in North America was banned in Florida by the Broward County Public Schools due to scenes of mating sequences as was reported by parents from two students who complained about the scenes.
The Last Picture Show	1971	1973	Banned in Phoenix, Arizona as pornography.
Deep Throat	1972	1970s	Banned in Tampa in the mid-1970s as pornography. The film was also briefly banned in Miami but was lifted a short time afterward in February 1973.
Pink Flamingos	1972	1972–1997	Banned in Orange County, Florida, for 25 years because of explicit sexual content, animal cruelty, and depiction of its lead character, Divine, eating dog feces in the end.
The Devil in Miss Jones	1973	1973	Banned in Cleveland by a Cuyahoga County Common Pleas Court judge due to its explicit content shortly after its release. Prosecutors later argued that the film lacked "serious literary, artistic, political or scientific values" and that the film itself offended contemporary community standards.
Manson	1973	1975	The 83-minute documentary on convicted murderer Charles Manson was banned in 26 California counties by a federal judge because of its content. The ban of the film came one month after Squeaky Fromme's arrest in connection of the attempt assassination of then-President Gerald Ford in Sacramento.
The Thorn	1974	Since 1974 (seized in 1984)	Closed days after opening in New York City for misleading marketing exploiting the fame of one of its co-stars, Bette Midler. It was blocked from opening on re-release in 1980. The film was briefly distributed on home video under a new title before Midler threatened legal action.
Coonskin	1975	1975-1987	Ralph Bakshi's blaxploitation film received backlash due to the Congress of Racial Equality having deemed it racist, resulting in the film being withdrawn from theatrical distribution. Coonskin would not see the light of day again until it surfaced on home video with a new title 12 years later.
Caligula	1979	1979	A Summit County, Ohio judge banned the film across Akron shortly after its U.S. release, despite not including a ruling on the obscenity aspects of the case. The ban was also issued because of four adultery-based companies, including Penthouse International, being involved in producing and exhibiting the film, which led a movie theater in nearby Fairlawn to cancel its short run.
Monty Python's Life of Brian	1979	1979	Banned in several towns for showing controversial themes about Christianity.
The Tin Drum	1979	1997	Briefly banned in Oklahoma County, Oklahoma, when a district court judge deemed the film child pornography. The shot in question depicted a child embracing a naked woman. The verdict was overturned on appeal.
Cruising	1980	1980	The United Artists film based on the novel by The New York Times reporter Gerald Walker was banned in Brook Park, Ohio because of the film's plot.
If You Love This Planet	1982	1982	Designated as "foreign political propaganda" by the Department of Justice and suppressed in the United States. Despite this, it went on to win the 1982 Academy Award for Documentary Short Subject.
Return to Oz	1985	1985	The Disney live-action film was banned for a very short period of time by the Ingham County Library near Lansing, Michigan. At the time, the library had scheduled it and Beverly Hills Cop for a free film program, which was cancelled because of non-compliance with a recommendation by the school board that insisted on only films that the MPAA had rated G be shown at the library. The ban was lifted soon afterward.
Hail Mary	1985	1985	Sack Theatres, a Greater Boston theater chain, refused to screen the film from all of its theaters because of the film's context and plot, which its president replied that the ban was "decisional to err on the side of humanity and not break anybody's hearts or cause any tears". The ban took place one month before Sack Theatres was renamed USA Cinemas in December 1985.
Superstar: The Karen Carpenter Story	1987	Since 1990	Banned from circulation for copyright infringement after its original television airing by PBS as song covers by The Carpenters were used without permission.
In the Night Kitchen	1987	Since 1989	The animated short film based on Maurice Sendak's picture book is banned from being televised for the same reasons with the book. However, it made a limited availability on DVD in 2002.
The Last Temptation of Christ	1988	1988	Banned in Savannah, Georgia when city leaders sent a petition to Universal Pictures requesting a ban. However, it opened in Savannah on September 23, 1988, six weeks after its national and worldwide debut. The film was also banned in Louisville, Kentucky by the Louisville division of the Washington, D.C.-based Traditional Values Coalition.
Hollyrock-a-Bye Baby	1993	1993-2001, 2003-2012	Banned after the initial broadcast for its questionable content in a children's movie and remained unseen on television for nearly a decade. Then was withdrawn again until it surfaced on DVD in 2012.
The Santa Clause	1994	1996-1999	Confiscated from the markets due to an incident caused by a little child from Steilacoom, Washington making a phone call that was taken from one point in the film, which turned out to be an actual sex line number, incurring a $400 phone bill. The film returned to the markets much later with the number removed.
Stolen Memories: Secrets from the Rose Garden	1996	Since 1996	Banned after its initial broadcast for the depictions of racial atrocities and child murder attempts which were declared "unsuitable for television".
Belly	1998	1998	The film about the rise-and-fall of two violent criminals was banned from the Magic Johnson Theatres chain due to concerns regarding the film's overwhelmingly negative and violent depictions of African-Americans alongside its potential to incite disruptive behavior at their theaters in Los Angeles, Houston, and Atlanta.
The Lion King II: Simba's Pride	1998	2002-2004	Pulled from television rotation due to the dark subject matter, which was edited for subsequent release.
Toy Story 2	1999	2018-2019	Briefly pulled from television rotation during the MeToo movement due to a scene during the mid-credits in which the Prospector interacts with a group of Barbie dolls in a manner reminiscent of a sexual harassment scandal involving the film's executive producer, John Lasseter. That scene was later removed from the credits altogether.
Cry Baby Lane	2000	2000-2011 (alleged ban)	Aired on Nickelodeon in October 2000. It was not seen after its initial broadcast as it received backlash by parents disapproving the film's themes as unsuitable for attending audiences. It was assumed that this led to the film being banned from subsequent showings, but later clarified that Nickelodeon had simply forgotten the film, resulting in its absence for 11 years. The tape was found and uploaded on Reddit in 2011. Another Nickelodeon film, The Electric Piper, was not seen after its second run in 2003 and was also a forgotten film mistaken as being banned.
The Profit	2001	2002–2007	A film that borrows elements of the life of L. Ron Hubbard, it was prevented from release when the Church of Scientology claimed the film could taint the jury pool in the wrongful death trial of former member Lisa McPherson. While the injunction has since been lifted a few years after the suit was settled and the film is no longer banned per se, a legal dispute with investor Robert S. Minton continues to hold up the release. The Disinformation Book of Lists and The Times have characterized The Profit as a "banned film" in the United States.
Ernest and Bertram	2002	Since 2002	Gay parody of Ernie and Bert was confiscated when Sesame Workshop served the film's producers with a cease and desist order for violating the use of Sesame Street characters.
The Aristocrats	2005	2005	AMC Theatres refused to screen the movie in all of their theaters because of both vulgar language and a matter of commercial considerations.
Death of a President	2006	2006	Shortly after the mockumentary film's release in Canada and the United Kingdom, many American movie theater chains including AMC, Regal, Carmike, and Cinemark refused to run the controversial British feature and banned it due to its depiction of a fictional incident in which then-President George W. Bush was assassinated. Regal's president Dick Westerling replied that "we do not feel it is appropriate to portray the future assassination of a president". At the same time, CNN and the National Public Radio announced that neither network would accept commercials for the film due to its extreme nature.
Hounddog	2007	2007-2008	After the screening at Sundance Film Festival in January 2007, the film was withheld from being theatrically released since Dakota Fanning was involved as a part of the movie's rape scene when she was 12, receiving intense controversy. The ban was lifted in September the following year. The film was boycotted from theaters by the protest of concerned mothers days after the release, citing that the damage has already been done to the child actress. The film did receive a home video release after the theatrical screening.
Hillary: The Movie	2008	2008	A political documentary about presidential candidate Hillary Clinton, it was prevented by the Federal Election Commission from being aired on video-on-demand on cable TV shortly before the 2008 Democratic primaries as an "electioneering communication" due to mentioning a candidate within 30 days of a primary, an apparent violation of the 2002 Bipartisan Campaign Reform Act (aka "McCain-Feingold"). The ban, and much of the BCRA, was then overturned by the Supreme Court in the case Citizens United v. Federal Election Commission.
Beauty and the Beast (2017 version)	2017	2017	A drive-in theater operator for the Henagar Drive-In in Henagar, Alabama refused to screen the Disney movie due to backlash over a gay character appearing in the movie.

== See also ==
- List of banned films
- Cinema of the United States
- Film censorship in the United States
