= Paul Twitchell =

American writer and spiritual teacher

Sri Paul Twitchell ji

Personal life
- Born: Jacob Paul Twitchell; October 22, 1908, or 1909 Paducah, Kentucky, U.S.
- Died: September 17, 1971 (aged 61 or 62) Cincinnati, Ohio, U.S.
- Notable works: The Far Country; The Spiritual Notebook; The Tiger's Fang
- Other names: Peddar Zaskq, Carl Snyder, Charles Daniel, etc.
- Occupation: Freelance writer, religion founder

Religious life
- Religion: Eckankar
- Initiation: Surat Shabd Yoga; 1955; United States by Kirpal Singh

Senior posting
- Period in office: 1965–71
- Successor: Darwin Gross
- Influenced by: L. Ron Hubbard, Swami Premananda Giri, Kirpal Singh, Julian Johnson
- Influenced: William Buhlman, Allen Feldman, Sheila Gibson, Sher Gill, Darwin Gross, Duane Lee Heppner, Roger Delano Hinkins, Grantham Taylor Hughes, Harold Klemp, Paul Marché, Jerry Mulvin, Gary Olsen, Michael Edward Owens, Evan Pritchard, Michael Sebastian, Jon Stauffer, Christopher Tims, Michael Turner

Jacob Paul Twitchell (October 22, 1908, or 1909 – September 17, 1971) was an American writer and spiritual teacher who created and directed the development of the new religious movement known as Eckankar. Twitchell described himself as "The Mahanta, the Living ECK Master" from 1965 onward. These are terms without proven historical use before 1965 and his usage. He also ascribed to himself the name Peddar Zaskq in his writings.

== Birth and early life ==
Paul Twitchell was born in Paducah, Kentucky, to Effie Dorothy and Jacob Noah Twitchell. His date of birth has been given variously between 1908 and 1922, with the Library of Congress' Name Authority File giving 1908 and a spring 1910 census suggesting 1909. Upon Twitchell's death in 1971, his second wife Gail told the medical examiner that Paul was born on October 22, 1922, the same date presented in their marriage certificate. However, his marriage certificate with his first wife, Camille Bellowe, gave his date of birth as October 22, 1912.

Twitchell himself provided varying accounts of the circumstances of his birth. In his book The Spiritual Notebook, calling himself by his "spiritual name" Peddar Zaskq, Twitchell claimed to have been "born on a packetboat amid the Mississippi River, a few minutes after a great earthquake shook the mid-South and formed a great lake in this region." That version echoed the tradition that a new Buddha is born near water. In his biography In My Soul I am Free, authored by Brad Steiger, he claimed to have been born in a place called China Point, the location of which is not clear.

Following graduation from high school in Paducah, Twitchell attended Murray State Teachers College in Murray, Kentucky for two years before going to Western Kentucky State Teachers College, which he left in 1934 without having obtained a degree.

His first marriage was to Camille Ballowe, from Paducah, in Providence, Rhode Island, on August 12, 1942. He claims to have served in the United States Naval Reserve during World War II, from February 1942 until August 1945 when as Lieutenant Jg. he was honorably discharged. Twitchell became a correspondent for Our Navy magazine after the war for a short time. He later went on to become a freelance journalist, though he found success elusive.

== Eckankar ==
Twitchell investigated a number of diverse spiritual movements and became an avid reader of spiritual, philosophical, religious and occult books at the library. In 1950, he joined Swami Premananda Giri's Self-Revelation Church of Absolute Monism, an offshoot of Paramahansa Yogananda's Self-Realization Fellowship. He lived on the grounds of the church, and edited its periodical, The Mystic Cross. In July 1955 Twitchell was arrested following violent fights with others living in the Swami's compound. The Swami's group terminated its relationship with Twitchell. A few months later his wife left him, they formally separated, and she remained in the compound for a short time. Their divorce was finalized in 1960.

Twitchell was initiated into the Surat Shabd Yoga by Kirpal Singh, Master of the Sant Mat group "Ruhani Satsang," in October 1955 in Washington, D.C. He immediately became a devoted student of Singh, acknowledged experiences during Initiation and later wrote to his master of his appearing in Twitchell's apartment and dictating discourses to him which he typed up and mailed to Singh in New Delhi, India. By 1966 reports to Singh that Twitchell was teaching a program very similar to Sant Mat caused a rift between them that was never repaired. Weeks before Twitchell died he sent a letter to Singh denying he ever saw him as a 'master' or ever received an initiation from Singh because Singh had no power to give initiation, and claiming that Twitchell's spiritual achievements were gained years before they met. Twitchell also suggested that he never spiritually benefited from his connection with Singh.

However, in December 1963 Twitchell reportedly asked Singh to allow him to dedicate a book, The Tiger's Fang, in Singh's name. Twitchell wanted Singh's help to get it published and sent the manuscript for Singh's approval. Twitchell never received a positive response from Singh and following their disagreement in 1966 he asked for its return. He published it himself in 1967.

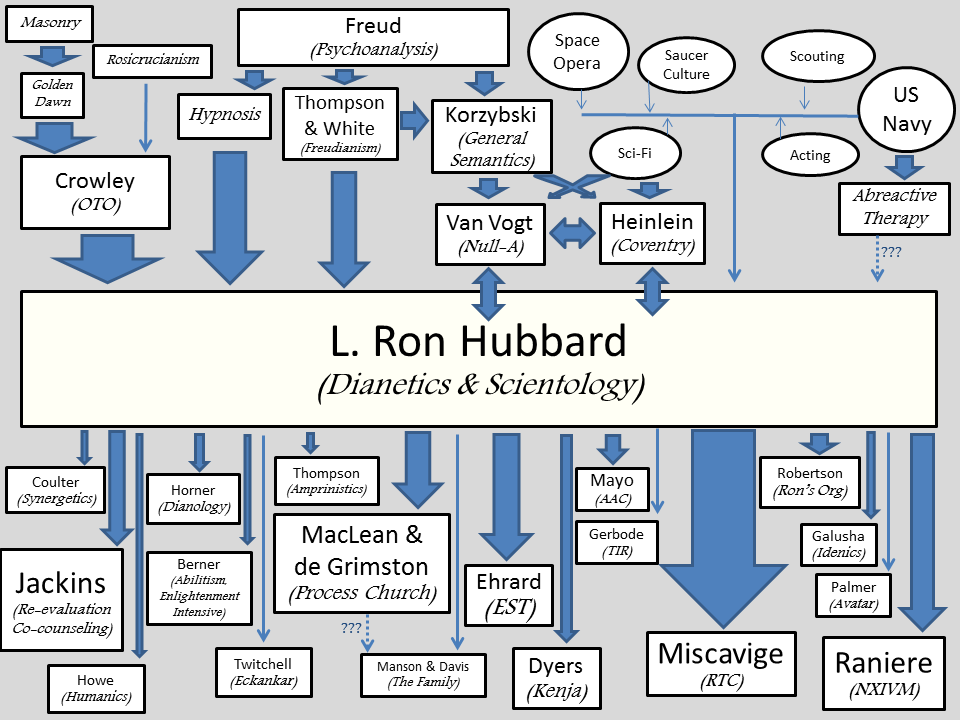
Hubbard's beliefs and practices, drawn from a diverse set of sources, influenced numerous offshoots, splinter groups, and new movements.

Twitchell's first known connection with L. Ron Hubbard (also a US Naval Reserve Officer during WW2 and pulp fiction author) was around 1950 during the Dianetics period. He again became involved in the Church of Scientology from about 1956 to 1959, becoming a member of the Church's staff and supposedly one of the first Scientologists to become clear. Twitchell taught classes, audited others, wrote articles for the magazines, and did other activities for Scientology. He made many long-term friendships during this time with the exception of Hubbard, who circa 1968 listed Twitchell and Eckankar on his suppressive persons/groups list. Hubbard described Twitchell not as a clear, as Twitchell always claimed, but as "aberrant".

Moving to Seattle, Washington, in late 1960 after the death of his sister Kaydee (Katharine) in 1959, he met Gail Ann Atkinson in 1962. She was working part-time at the library, where they met, while pursuing undergraduate degree. Twitchell later introduced her to the Ruhani Satsang teachings, and others, and Gail was also formally initiated by Singh in early December 1963 in San Francisco, during his second tour of the US. At the same time Twitchell relocated to San Francisco permanently. They married soon after on January 16, 1964, when Twitchell began more seriously writing and compiling materials about his new teaching, Eckankar. The first draft manuscript for The Far Country was written during this year. Twitchell also began having articles about Eckankar published in various newspapers and magazines.

In late 1964, they moved south to San Diego, where Twitchell gave his first lectures on Eckankar and what was then termed the "bilocation" technique, which he later called "Soul Travel." Gail quit her studies to work full-time so that Twitchell could dedicate himself to establishing Eckankar as a new business venture. In spring 1965, he began a long-term series of regular lectures and workshops on Eckankar at the California Parapsychology Foundation in San Diego and also started selling monthly "Discourses" to interested students. By late 1965 the Twitchells had together founded the Eckankar Corporation and Illuminated Way Press, registering both as companies in California.

It is believed that Twitchell's second wife suggested that he adapt some of his spiritual education into a new religion. Twitchell said her encouragement was a spark for him to do something more with his writings. Critics say that at first Twitchell claimed his teachings were new but that he eventually said they were an ancient science that predated all other major religious belief systems. Others say this interpretation is based on comments Twitchell made before he officially started Eckankar, when he was promoting what he called his "Cliff-Hanger" philosophy, an "outsider's" view on modern society. Those were indeed his own views and ideas, but once he launched Eckankar in October 1965, he always called it an ancient teaching. In his book Eckankar: The Key to Secret Worlds, Twitchell lays out wide-ranging examples of the teaching through history while also relaying his personal experiences with his teacher, "ECK master Rebazar Tarzs." The actual existence of "Rebazar Tarzs," like that of other Theosophical and ECK masters, remains disputed, since there is no evidence that anyone has seen Tarzs, other than the faith claims of Twitchell and his followers. Some believe Tarzs was a persona Twitchell created to cover his previous associations with Kirpal Singh etc., or to provide the public with the image of a personally powerful and intellectual teacher.

After founding Eckankar, Twitchell wrote and published a series of books and personal study discourses, gave talks around the world, wrote thousands of letters to students, and continued to write articles for magazines. He wrote a series of articles shortly after starting Eckankar that some critics have raised concerns about. In a series that Twitchell referred to as "The Man Who Talks To God," he poked fun at gurus, including himself. He says that he wrote the series in exchange for getting a booklet printed on Eckankar, during a time when he couldn't afford it himself. In that column he gave out spiritual advice, claiming to communicate with God about the problems of those who wrote to him. He included prophecy, predicting that the Vietnam War would end in 1968 and that Lyndon Johnson would be reelected president of the United States. Many of his answers were concluded with the words "I HAVE SPOKEN!"

== As a writer ==
In 1984, Harold Klemp, the current spiritual leader of Eckankar—which keeps an archive of Twitchell's writings—commented on Twitchell as a writer: "He was an avid letter-writer, and he always kept a carbon copy ... At one time Paul made his living by writing for pulp magazines. He also wrote public-relations copy for the Navy... He sincerely cared about spiritual unfoldment and growth. He went through volumes of books on consciousness, a subject which was not in vogue in those days... he thrived on the study of different philosophies."

Klemp also describes Twitchell as a master compiler: "The high teachings of ECK had been scattered to the four corners of the world. The different masters each had parts and pieces of it, but they attached little requirements ... You must be a vegetarian, or you have to meditate so many hours a day ... Paul gathered up the whole teaching and took the best. Though it may be strange to say, in this sense I see him as a master compiler. He gathered the golden teachings that were scattered around the world and made them readily available to us."

In Paulji, A Memoir, Patti Simpson reveals how Twitchell put her in charge of a monthly communication to students called the Mystic World. It often contained many mistakes: stories that were supposed to continue on a certain page but didn't, stories stopping in mid-sentence, or the wrong names under pictures. Twitchell told her, "You have no idea ... how much help it will be to me if you can learn how to take care of this publication for me. I have so many books to get out, and I need to spend time on them."

Twitchell told famed writer on the paranormal Brad Steiger that he expected The Tiger's Fang to be controversial, having announced that it "would shake the foundation of the teachings of orthodox religions, philosophies, and metaphysical concepts."

== Allegations of plagiarism ==
In a 2006 article published in the 5 volume Introduction to New and Alternative Religions in America, David C. Lane, a professor of philosophy and sociology at Mt. San Antonio College, noted that many of Twitchell's Eckankar books contained lengthy passages from other authors' books without proper attribution or citation. In particular, Lane claims Twitchell's 1966 book The Far Country plagiarizes over 400 paragraphs from the books With a Great Master in India and The Path of the Masters by Julian Johnson without any acknowledgment. Three other books of Twitchell's, including The Tiger's Fang, Letters to Gail, and Shariyat-Ki-Sugmad, contain "almost verbatim" extracts from Johnson's 1939 book The Path of the Masters according to Lane. Lane notes that Twitchell wrote in at least two publications that he considered a book edited by Johnson—Sar Bachan—his "Bible".

Harold Klemp has responded to the plagiarism allegations by stating that Twitchell's role was that of "master compiler", saying, "He gathered the golden teachings that were scattered around the world and made them readily available to us." But Surat shabda yoga and the Sikh/Hindu guru systems were already available in 1965 through groups faithful to their sources. In 2007, a member of Eckankar's clergy and Eckankar apologist since 1983, Doug Marman, published The Whole Truth, a biography of Twitchell that disputes claims Lane made in The Making of a Spiritual Movement. Lane has published commentary on Marman's book, reaffirming his view that Twitchell plagiarized several authors. (Note: Marman's book The Whole Truth was published in January 2007. David Christopher Lane, in the Notes section of his article published in 2006 in Introduction to New and Alternative Religions in America, states that he is responding to Marman's book part of which was available online at the time Lane wrote his piece.)

Lane has also alleged that Twitchell lied about his past and tried to cover up his earlier associations. Marman has responded by presenting documentation related to Twitchell's career and personal information.

=== Sampling ===
A sampling of three significant passages from Julian Johnson's The Path of the Masters (1985–1988 pagination), appearing in Twitchell's and Darwin Gross's works, displays the prose which has proven appealing to Western seekers:

The Path of the Masters	Twitchell, The Far Country (1987 pagination)	Twitchell, The Tiger's Fang (1969 pagination)
"Each and every man, when properly trained, is able to detach himself from the physical body while still living in that body in perfect health, and then travel to all parts of the outlying universe." — p 343	"Each and every man, when properly trained, is able to detach himself from the physical body, while still living in that body in perfect health, and travel to all parts of the outlying universe." — p 101	"Man, when properly trained, is able to detach himself from the physical body to travel to all parts of his outlying universe." — p 117

The Path of the Masters	Twitchell, The Spiritual Notebook (1979 pagination)	Darwin Gross, Your Right to Know
"... if you live rightly among men, and then devote yourself to the practice of the Surat Shabd Yoga, you will enter the kingdom of heaven while you are still living in the body. And that constitutes a world of difference between the spiritual science of the Masters and all religions." — p 57	"... if the chela faithfully practices the spiritual exercises, he will enter the Kingdom of Heaven while still living in the human body. This is the fundamental difference between ECK and all other religions." — p 170	"... if the chela faithfully practices the spiritual exercises, he will enter the kingdom of heaven while still living in the human body. This is the fundamental difference between ECK and all other religions." — p 27

The Path of the Masters	Twitchell, The Far Country (1987 pagination)	Darwin Gross, Your Right to Know
"The student leaves his body much in the same way a dying man leaves it, except that the student does it voluntarily and the process is always under his own control, and he can come back into the body any moment he wishes to return. Otherwise, his passing out of this body is practically the same as that of the dying man. He thus learns what death means, and also what lies beyond death–even becoming acquainted with his future home to which he is to go when he finally leaves his body. He may also converse with friends who have long ago left their bodies. This masterful achievement cannot fail to interest the student since it solves the gravest problems of life and destiny. This is one phase of the great work of the Masters. They have broken the seal of death, and so to them and their students there is no more death. And all of this is positive knowledge, not speculation or guess. Neither is it interpretation of any book." — p 418	"The charges leave their bodies, much in the same way a dying man leaves, except the neophyte does it voluntarily. The process is always under his own control and he can come back into the body at any moment he wishes to return. Otherwise, his passing out of the body is practically the same as that of the dying man. He thus learns how to use the shottama, what death means, and also what lies beyond death,–even becoming acquainted with the future home to which he is to go, when he finally takes leave of his physical body. He may also converse with friends and family who have long ago left their bodies. This achievement cannot fail to interest the neophyte, since it solves the gravest problems of life and destiny. It is one phase of the great work of the ECK travelers. They have broken the seal of death, and so to them and their charges there is no more death. All of this is positive knowledge, not speculation or guess work. Neither is it the interpretation of any book." — p 199–200	"The students in ECKANKAR learn to leave their bodies much in the same way a dying man leaves his shell, except the neophyte does it voluntarily and the process is always under his control, and he can come back into the body at any moment he wishes to return. Otherwise his passing out of the body is practically the same as that of a dying man. He understands what death means and views what lies beyond death. He may even become acquainted with the astral home to which he is to go when he finally takes leave of his physical body. He may even converse with friends and family who have long before left their physical bodies. This achievement cannot fail to interest the neophyte since it solves the gravest problems of life and destiny. It is one phase of the great work of the Spiritual Travelers in ECKANKAR. They have broken the seal of death and so to them and their charges there is no more death. All of this is positive knowledge, not speculation or guess work. Neither is it the interpretation of any book." — p 82

=== Appropriated terms ===
The Eckankar corporate body claims rights to a number of Indian language terms, including the following:

- EK / ECK
- Eckankar
- Mahanta
- Vairagi (Bairagi)
- Satsang

== Death ==
Twitchell died of a heart attack on September 17, 1971, in Cincinnati while attending an Eckankar seminar. Despite having formulated the Eckankar doctrine of named succession, he had not designated anyone as his successor and his sudden death created difficulties for the movement's leadership. It fell to his widow to make the final decision, and she selected Darwin Gross, who was succeeded by Harold Klemp.

== Books ==
- Twitchell, Paul (1939, 1972) Coins of Gold. First edition: Paducah, Ky.: Press Pub. Co. Second edition Illuminated Way Press.
- Twitchell, Paul (1966) Introduction to ECKANKAR. First edition Illuminated Way Press. no ISBN.
- Twitchell, Paul (1967, 1988) The Tiger's Fang. First edition Lancer Books. Second edition ECKANKAR. ISBN 0-88155-063-9
- Twitchell, Paul (1968, 1985) The Key to ECKANKAR. First edition Illuminated Way Press. Second edition ECKANKAR. ISBN 1-57043-034-9
- Twitchell, Paul (1969, 2010) The Flute of God. First edition Illuminated Way Press. Second edition ECKANKAR. ISBN 1-57043-032-2
- Twitchell, Paul (1969, 1987) Eckankar: The Key to Secret Worlds. Foreword by Brad Steiger. First edition Lancer Books. Second edition ECKANKAR. ISBN 0-88155-045-0
- Twitchell, Paul (1969, 1987) Anitya. First edition Illuminated Way Press. Second edition ECKANKAR. ISBN 0-914766-01-5
- Twitchell, Paul (1970) The Drums of ECK. First edition Illuminated Way Press. ISBN 0-914766-04-X
- Twitchell, Paul (1970) The Way of Dharma. First edition Illuminated Way Press. ISBN 0-914766-18-X
- Twitchell, Paul (1970, 1972, 1990) Dialogues with the Master. First edition Stockton-Doty Trade Press. Second edition Illuminated Way Press. Third edition ECKANKAR. ISBN 0-914766-78-3
- Twitchell, Paul (1970, 1971, 1990) The Far Country. First edition Stockton Trade Press. Second edition Illuminated Way Press. Third edition ECKANKAR. ISBN 0-914766-91-0 PDF
- Twitchell, Paul (1970, 1976, 1987) Stranger by the River. First edition Illuminated Way Press. Second edition Illuminated Way Press (non-standard). Third edition Eckankar. ISBN 1-57043-136-1
- Twitchell, Paul (1970, 1987) The Shariyat-Ki-Sugmad, Book I. First edition Illuminated Way Press. Second edition Eckankar. ISBN 1-57043-048-9
- Twitchell, Paul (1971, 1988) The Shariyat-Ki-Sugmad, Book II. First edition Illuminated Way Press. Second edition Eckankar. ISBN 1-57043-049-7
- Twitchell, Paul (1971, 1990) The Spiritual Notebook. First edition Illuminated Way Press. Second edition ECKANKAR. ISBN 1-57043-037-3 PDF
- Twitchell, Paul (1971, 1986) Herbs: The Magic Healers. First edition Illuminated Way Press. Second edition ECKANKAR. Library of Congress Catalog Number: 86-80814
- Twitchell, Paul (1972, 2010) The Eck-Vidya: Ancient Science of Prophecy. First edition Illuminated Way Press. Second edition ECKANKAR. ISBN 1-57043-030-6
- Twitchell, Paul (1973, 1987) Letters to Gail, Volume I. First edition Illuminated Way Press. Second edition ECKANKAR. ISBN 0-914766-73-2
- Twitchell, Paul (1974) Talons of Time. First edition Illuminated Way Press. No ISBN or LCCN.
- Twitchell, Paul (1975) Eckankar: Illuminated Way Letters, 1966-1971. Letters he wrote until his death in 1971. ISBN 0-914766-25-2
- Twitchell, Paul (1975) Eckankar: Compiled Writings, Volume 1. First edition Illuminated Way Press. ISBN 0-914766-26-0
- Twitchell, Paul (1975) Eckankar Dictionary. First edition Illuminated Way Press. ISBN 0-91476-605-8
- Twitchell, Paul (1977, 1987) Letters to Gail, Volume II. First edition Illuminated Way Press. Second edition ECKANKAR. ISBN 0-914766-33-3
- Twitchell, Paul (1978) East of Danger. First edition Illuminated Way Press. Copyright Gail Twitchell Gross. ISBN 0-914766-38-4
- Twitchell, Paul (1978) The Three Masks of Gaba. First edition Illuminated Way Press. ISBN 0-914766-98-8
- Twitchell, Paul (1980) Difficulties of Becoming the Living ECK Master. First edition Illuminated Way Press. Compiled by Burnadine Burlin. ISBN 0-914766-63-5
- Twitchell, Paul (1980) The Wisdom Notes. First edition ECKANKAR. ISBN 0-914766-63-5
- Twitchell, Paul (1990) Letters to Gail, Volume III. First edition ECKANKAR. Library of Congress Catalog Number: 90-83659.
- Twitchell, Paul (1999) Talons of Time. Graphic Novel. Authorized Eckankar edition. Illustrated by Mar Amongo. Ed. Harold Klemp and Joan Klemp. No ISBN or LCCN.
- Twitchell, Paul (2004) The Tiger's Fang. Graphic Novel. Authorized Eckankar edition. Illustrated by Mar Amongo. Ed. Harold Klemp and Joan Klemp. ISBN 1-57043-212-0

== Bibliography ==
- Jarvis, Jack, "Paul Twitchell, Man of Parts" in Seattle Post-Intelligencer, July 9, 1963.
- Johnson, Ford. Confessions of a God Seeker: A Journey to Higher Consciousness. "One" Publishing, 2003.
- Johnson, Julian, The Path of the Masters: The Science of Surat Shabd Yoga: The Yoga of the Audible Life Stream, France, 1939; US, 1957; Beās, East Pañjāb: Radha Soami Satsang Beas, 1972, 1985, 1993. ISBN 81-8256-019-5
- Klemp, Harold. The Secret Teachings: Mahanta Transcripts, Book 3. Eckankar, 1989. LCCN 89-84193
- Lane, David Christopher, The Making of a Spiritual Movement: The Untold Story of Paul Twitchell and Eckankar, Del Mar Press, 1993. ISBN 0-9611124-6-8
- Marman, Doug (2007), The Whole Truth: The Spiritual Legacy of Paul Twitchell. First edition, Spiritual Dialogues Project. ISBN 0-9793260-0-1
- Simpson, Patti, Hello, Friend. Illuminated Way, 1981. ISBN 0881550310. 2nd edition, Eckankar, 2002.
- Simpson, Patti (1985), Paulji, A Memoir. First edition, ECKANKAR. Library of Congress Catalog Number 85-81716.
- Steiger, Brad (1968), In My Soul I Am Free. First edition, Illuminated Way Press. ISBN 0-914766-11-2 (Note: Almost 35% of the text is Paul Twitchell's own words.)
- Sykes, Joe, 2020, The Truth About Eckankar, 3rd edition. Independently published. ISBN 9781691598519
- Wilson, George Tipton, "From Paducah to Eckankar" in The Courier-Journal, Louisville, Kentucky, 1982.

Eckankar
Preceded by Position created	ECK Master; 1965 – 1971	Succeeded by Darwin Gross
