= Ain't Nobody's Business If You Do =

Book by Peter McWilliams

- Cover to the paperback edition (1996)
- Author: Peter McWilliams
- Language: English
- Subject: Victimless crimes
- Genre: Nonfiction
- Publisher: Prelude Press
- Publication date: 1993
- Publication place: United States
- Media type: Print
- ISBN: 978-0-931-58053-6
- OCLC: 28687150
- LC Class: HV6707.U5 M32 1996

Ain't Nobody's Business if You Do: The Absurdity of Consensual Crimes in Our Free Country is a 1993 book by Peter McWilliams, in which he presents the history of legislation against what he feels are victimless crimes, or crimes that are committed consensually, as well as arguments for their legalization, giving the book a "libertarian manifesto" touch.

The book is divided into five sections.

- Part I gives a definition of victimless and consensual crime and outlines the difference between personal morality and governmentally-imposed morality.
- Part II presents arguments against the criminalization of victimless crimes.
- Part III gives a closer look into some of the individual activities which the author classifies as consensual crimes, such as prostitution and marijuana use, but which the majority of criminologists would classify as victimless. Other activities examined include gambling, recreational drug use, homosexuality, pornography, indecent exposure, and seat belt legislation.
- Part IV gives historical examples of the treatment of consensual and victimless crimes, such as Prohibition, and Biblical examples.
- Part V advises readers on what to do to change the laws.

Throughout the book are approximately six hundred quotations by noted thinkers on both sides of his positions (primarily supporters).

McWilliams presents a variety of arguments against the criminalization of victimless crimes. Some are philosophical in nature: one argument is that laws against these crimes are based in religion, which violates the separation of church and state. He also claims that they are un-American, as they attempt to homogenize the country to a certain group's idea of morality, and that they create an oppressive society, restricting personal freedoms without justification. Another claim is that they teach irresponsibility, by not letting people deal with the natural consequences of their actions, but rather penalizing them whether or not their actions harmed anyone else.

Other objections are practical: catching the "criminals" involved is an expensive affair. Victimless crimes draw manpower and funds away from crimes that do hurt innocent parties, and enforcement of the laws is not consistent enough to be an effective deterrent. He also argues that actions to help people deal with problems caused by these illegal activities are effectively prevented by their criminalization—for example, no one could be helped with their drinking problems during Prohibition. Additionally, he details how laws against victimless crimes paved the way for organized crime.
