= Peter McWilliams =

American author and activist (1949–2000)

- Born: Peter Alexander McWilliams; August 5, 1949; Detroit, Michigan, U.S.
- Died: June 14, 2000 (aged 50); Los Angeles County, California, U.S.
- Occupations: Author, poet, self-publisher, photographer, activist

Peter Alexander McWilliams (August 5, 1949 – June 14, 2000) was an American self-help author and advocate for the legalization of marijuana.

== Early life ==
McWilliams was born to a Roman Catholic family in Detroit, one of two sons of Henry G. and Mary (née Toarmina; later Fadden) McWilliams. His father worked as a supervisor at a drugstore and his mother was a part-time salesperson.

He attended Allen Park High School and Eastern Michigan University and later enrolled at Maharishi International University. At the age of 17 he wrote a collection of poems called Come Love with Me and Be My Life, which he self-published under the name Versemonger Press.

== Career and activism ==
McWilliams wrote, edited, directed, and produced the 1971 religious satire film The Thorn, starring John Hassberger and Bette Midler.

McWilliams wrote The TM Book in 1975 with Denise Denniston, which was at the top of the New York Times bestseller list for three weeks.

In 1976, he wrote TM: An Alphabetical Guide to the Transcendental Meditation Program with Denniston and Nat Goldhaber.

He wrote TM with Harold H. Bloomfield, and later co-wrote the book How to Heal Depression.

McWilliams was active in Erhard Seminars Training with Werner Erhard and Stuart Emory's "Actualizations" large-group awareness training before meeting John-Roger in the fall of 1978.

He wrote nearly 40 books including Surviving the Loss of a Love (1971), The Personal Computer Book (1982) and Life 101: Everything We Wish We Had Learned About Life in School but Didn't (1990). His 1982 book, The Word Processing Book: A Short Course in Computer Literacy, was published during the "computer revolution" and was "highly successful." McWilliams was a photographer, and a collection of his own photographs were published in October 1992 in a book titled Portraits – A Book of Photographs by Peter McWilliams.

McWilliams was arrested and charged with growing marijuana in 1997. He was released from custody on $250,000 bail and with the "condition that he not use marijuana." His book Ain't Nobody's Business if You Do: The Absurdity of Consensual Crimes in Our Free Society, published in 1993, made a case for the legalization of drugs and became a favored publication of the Libertarian Party. Life 101 and subsequent books list John-Roger (Roger Delano Hinkins), the leader of the Church of the Movement of Spiritual Inner Awareness, as his co-writer. McWilliams later repudiated the movement, claiming to be the sole author of the books.

== Health issues and death ==
McWilliams was diagnosed with non-Hodgkin's lymphoma in 1996. He died on June 14, 2000, in his Los Angeles home, of AIDS-related non-Hodgkin's lymphoma. He was survived by his mother and brother, Michael McWilliams. At the time he was awaiting sentencing for his conviction of conspiring to "possess, manufacture and sell marijuana."

Cannabis activist Richard Cowan and other critics of the drug policies in the United States have described his death as murder by the U.S. government, insofar as they denied him the use of the medical marijuana which might have prevented his death. William F. Buckley stated that McWilliams was vomiting and in pain when he died.

He is entombed at the Westwood Village Memorial Park Cemetery in Westwood, California.

== Selected bibliography ==
- Surviving the Loss of a Love (Versemonger, 1971)
- The McWilliams II Word Processor Instruction Manual (ISBN 0-671-50433-9) (1983)
- You Can't Afford the Luxury of a Negative Thought (ISBN 0-931580-57-9) (1988), co-authored with John-Roger
- Life 101: Everything We Wish We Had Learned about Life in School but Didn't (ISBN 978-0-931580-10-9) (1990)
- Do It! Let's Get Off Our Buts (1991)
- How to Survive the Loss of a Love (1991), co-authored with Melba Colgrove and Harold H. Bloomfield
- Come Love With Me and Be My Life (1992)
- Portraits – A Book of Photographs by Peter McWilliams (1992)
- Ain't Nobody's Business If You Do: The Absurdity of Consensual Crimes in a Free Society (1993)
- Life 102: What to Do When Your Guru Sues You (1994)
- Love 101: To Love Oneself is the Beginning of a Lifelong Romance (1995)

== See also ==
- Legal history of cannabis in the United States
- Gonzales v. Raich
- Health issues and the effects of cannabis
- Cannabis legalization in the United States
