= Insight Seminars =

Insight Seminars is an international non-profit organization headquartered in Santa Monica, California. The first seminar was held in 1978 by founders John-Roger and Russell Bishop under the name Insight Training Seminars. Insight has held seminars in 34 countries for adults, teens, and children, in addition to Business Insight corporate trainings. Seminars are primarily presented in English and Spanish, and have also been translated into Russian, Portuguese, Bulgarian, and Greek.

== Insight Seminar Series ==
The Insight Seminar series includes five core seminars, taken in sequence, and a variety of graduate and public events. In each seminar, facilitators lead groups of 40-200+ participants through group exercises, partner discussions, lectures, and guided visualization processes.
