= Philip Babcock Gove =

American lexicographer

- Gove in 1961
- Born: June 27, 1902; Concord, New Hampshire, US
- Died: November 16, 1972 (aged 70); Warren, Massachusetts, US
- Education: Columbia University; Harvard University; Dartmouth College
- Occupations: Lexicographer; editor
- Employer: G. and C. Merriam Company
- Notable work: Webster's Third New International Dictionary

Philip Babcock Gove (June 27, 1902 – November 16, 1972) was an American lexicographer who was the editor-in-chief of the Webster's Third New International Dictionary, published in 1961.

Born in Concord, New Hampshire, he received his A.B. from Dartmouth College, his A.M. from Harvard University, his Ph.D. from Columbia University, and his D.Litt. from Dartmouth. He published The Imaginary Voyage in Prose Fiction in 1941. He started working for the G. and C. Merriam Company in 1946. Gove was managing editor of Webster's Third from 1950 to 1952, general editor from 1952 to 1960, and editor-in-chief from 1960 until his retirement in 1967.

Gove's work on Webster's Third was highly controversial for its descriptive rather than prescriptive approach and its minimalist approach to labeling informal or slang terms as such. While Merriam executives objected to including "morally objectionable" entries, Gove listed most popular swear words except fuck.

Gove died at his farm home in Warren, Massachusetts, of a heart attack on November 16, 1972.
