= David C. Lane =

American sociologist and author

David Christopher Lane (born April 29, 1956 in Burbank, California) is a professor of philosophy and sociology at Mt. San Antonio College, in Walnut, California. He is notable for his book The Making of a Spiritual Movement: The Untold Story of Paul Twitchell and Eckankar which exposed the origins of Eckankar and demonstrated the plagiarism of its founder, Paul Twitchell. He is also notable for introducing to a wider audience the teachings of Baba Faqir Chand, the Indian exponent of Surat Shabd Yoga from Hoshiapur in the book, The Unknowing Sage: The Life and Work of Baba Faqir Chand. Lane founded the journal, Understanding Cults and Spiritual Movements in the 1980s which featured critical studies of John-Roger Hinkins and Movement of Spiritual Inner Awareness, Adi Da, and Sathya Sai Baba. His most recent book, The Sound Current Tradition (2022) was on Nada Yoga and Surat Shabd Yoga in new religions and was published by Cambridge University Press. He also co-authored an annotated bibliography on the Radhasoami Tradition with Mark Juergensmeyer for Oxford University Press (2018).

== Education ==
Lane has a PhD and an MA in the sociology of knowledge from the University of California at San Diego, where he was also a recipient of a Regents Fellowship. Additionally, he has an MA in History and Phenomenology of Religion from the Graduate Theological Union in Berkeley, California and a BA from California State University, Northridge. Lane received his A.A. from Los Angeles Valley College and attended Notre Dame High School in his youth. Lane received an Honorary Doctorate (Honoris Causa) from the Dayalbagh Educational Institute, Agra, India (2021) for his work on the interface between neuroscience and consciousness.

== Career ==
Lane was a lecturer in religious studies at California State University from 2001 to 2013 who specialized in the study of new religious movements including cults and the interface between science and religion.

Raised Catholic, Lane went on to be initiated in 1978 by Charan Singh (guru) of Radha Soami Satsang Beas. He later has become critical of some but not all of the teachings of Radha Soami Sant Mat. Lane has been a strict vegetarian since the age of 16 and in a 2015 interview on Skeptiko mentions that he meditates from 2 to 3 hours daily.

He previously taught at the University of California, San Diego, The California School of Professional Psychology, the University of Humanistic Studies, Palomar College, Mira Costa College, and the University of London and other academic institutions. He has given invited lectures at the London School of Economics, California State University, Fullerton. In 2010 was a keynote speaker at the SPIRCON conference at the Dayalbagh Educational Institute in Agra, India, featured in the book Spiritual Consciousness. In November 2014 Lane gave a plenary talk at QANSAS (Quantum and Nano Computing Systems and Applications) International Conference in Agra. The talk was entitled "The Oceanic Metaphor : Meaning Equivalence (M.E.), Probability Theory, and The Virtual Simulation Hypothesis of Consciousness." This talk was published as the book, The Oceanic Metaphor. On October 12, 2015, Lane was the keynote speaker at California State University, Fullerton, sponsored by the Sociology Department, on the topic of the illusory nature behind religious visions and the Chandian Effect which was published as a book. Lane, along with Mark Juergensmeyer was the plenary speaker on August 24, 2018, at the Dayalbagh Educational Institute for the 200th birth anniversary of Shiv Dayal Singh, the founder of Radhasoami.

In an interview in the San Diego Reader published on June 22, 1995, Lane complained about receiving death threats from defenders of several new religious movements or cults. He has also been involved in a number of lawsuits due to his critical stance of these groups.

== Personal ==
David Lane is married to Andrea Diem (b. 1965), who is also a Professor of Philosophy at Mt. San Antonio. They have two sons, Shaun (b. 2000) and Kelly (b. 2006). Lane won the World Bodysurfing Contest in 1999 and the International Bodysurfing Contest eight times (1997, 1998, 2000, 2004, 2011, 2014, 2015, 2016). Lane is a strict vegan.

== Bibliography ==
- Lane, David Christopher (1993) [1978], The making of a spiritual movement: the untold story of Paul Twitchell and Eckankar, Religious information systems series, vol. 11.; Garland reference library of social science, v. 891., Garland Publishing, ISBN 978-0-8153-1276-5, OCLC 26723709
- Lane, David Christopher (1992), The Radhasoami tradition : a critical history of guru successorship, Sects and cults in America., Bibliographical guides; v. 14; Garland reference library of social science, v. 623., New York, ISBN 978-0-8240-5247-8, OCLC 26013140
- Chand, Faqir; Lane, David Christopher (1993), The unknowing sage : the life and work of Baba Faqir Chand, Mt. San Antonio College Press, ISBN 978-1-56543-022-8, OCLC 33342282
- Lane, David Christopher (1994), The Making of a Spiritual Movement: The Untold Story of Paul Twitchell & Eckankar (revised ed.), Del Mar Press, ISBN 978-0-9611124-6-2
- Lane, David Christopher (1994), Exposing cults : when the skeptical mind confronts the mystical, Garland reference library of social science, v. 890.; Religious information systems series, vol. 10., Garland Pub, ISBN 978-0-8153-1275-8, OCLC 30026733
- Lane, David Christopher (1995), The enchanted land : a journey with the saints of India, MSAC Philosophy Group, ISBN 978-1-56543-053-2, OCLC 33210167
- Lowe, Scott; Lane, David Christopher (1996), DA : the strange case of Franklin Jones, MSAC Philosophy Group, ISBN 978-1-56543-054-9, OCLC 34503293
- Lane, David Christopher (2022), The Sound Current Tradition : a historical overview, Cambridge University Press. 2022., ISBN 978-1-00904-782-1
- Lane, David Christopher (2018), The Radhasoami Tradition: an annotated bibliography:, Oxford University Press. 2018., ISBN 978-1-00904-782-1

== See also ==
- List of cult researchers
- Cults
- Mark Juergensmeyer
- Academic study of new religious movements
- New religious movement
