= Eckankar =

Religious movement founded in 1965 by Paul Twitchell

- The Eckankar "EK" symbol
- Type: Dharma-influenced new religious movement
- Scripture: Main: Shariyat-Ki-Sugmad; Minor: Autobiography of a Modern Prophet etc.
- The Living ECK Master: Doug Kunin
- Region: Mostly worldwide
- Headquarters: Temple of ECK, Chanhassen, Minnesota, United States
- Founder: Paul Twitchell
- Origin: 1965; 61 years ago San Diego, California
- Official website: www.eckankar.org

The Temple of Eck in Chanhassen, Minnesota, U.S.

Eckankar (/ˈɛkənˌkɑːr/ EK-ən-kar) is an American new religious movement founded by Paul Twitchell in 1965. The group’s spiritual home is the Temple of ECK in Chanhassen, Minnesota. Eckankar is not affiliated with any other religious group.

The movement teaches simple spiritual exercises, such as singing "HU ", called "a love song to God", to experience the light and sound of God and recognize the presence of the Holy Spirit.

== Etymology ==
Twitchell was known for adapting Sanskrit words into English, and Eckankar is likely his adaptation of the sacred Sikh phrase Ik Onkar, meaning "One Creator". According to the Eckankar glossary, the term Eckankar means "co-worker with God".

Eck is intended to mean the "Holy Spirit", as found in Christian biblical terminology.

== History ==
The movement was founded in 1965 by Paul Twitchell (spiritual name: Peddar Zaskq), who remained its spiritual leader ("Living ECK Master") until his death in 1971. He was succeeded by Darwin Gross (spiritual name: Dap Ren). On October 22, 1981, Harold Klemp (spiritual name: Wah Z) was announced as the spiritual leader. Between 1981 and 1987, both Gross and Klemp claimed to be the Living ECK Master and the Inner Master and had their own followers. On October 25, 2025, Doug Kunin was named as Klemp's successor.

Eckankar's headquarters were originally in Las Vegas, Nevada. In 1975, under Gross's leadership, the organization moved to Menlo Park, California. In 1986, Klemp moved the base of operations to Minneapolis, Minnesota.

Eckankar is registered as a nonprofit religious organization. It reports members in more than 120 countries, and its teachings have been translated into over 25 languages. The number of members, known as ECKists, is undisclosed. The world headquarters and Temple of Eck, Eckankar's Spiritual Center, are in Chanhassen, Minnesota, on a 174-acre (70 ha) campus with 2 miles (3.2 km) of contemplation trails open to the public.

The Eckankar "EK" symbol appears on the Available Emblems of Belief for Placement on Government Headstones and Markers by the United States Department of Veterans Affairs. Sources estimate that there were around 50,000 followers in the 1990s.

== Beliefs ==
Some scholars believe that Eckankar beliefs draw in part from the Sikh and Hindu religions, particularly the Radha Soami movement, but J. Gordon Melton finds significant differences between Radha Soami teachings and Eckankar.

One of the basic tenets is that soul (the true self) may be experienced separately from the physical body and, in full consciousness, travel freely in "other planes of reality." Eckankar emphasizes personal spiritual experiences as the most natural way back to God. These are attained via Soul Travel: shifting the awareness from the body to inner planes of existence.

Certain mantras or chants are used to facilitate spiritual growth. One important spiritual exercise is the singing or chanting of HU (/hjuː/), which is viewed in Eckankar as a "love song to God." It is pronounced like the English word "hue" in a long, drawn-out breath and is sung for 20 to 30 minutes. ECKists sing it alone or in small groups. They believe that singing HU draws one closer to the Divine Being and that it can expand awareness, help one experience divine love, heal broken hearts, offer solace in times of grief, and bring peace and calm. ECKists believe the practice allows practitioners to retreat from the overwhelming input of the physical senses and emotions and regain the Soul's spiritually higher viewpoint.

Dreams are regarded as important teaching tools, and members often keep dream journals to facilitate study. According to followers of Eckankar, dream travel often serves as the gateway to Soul Travel (also known by Eckankar as an out-of-body experience), or the shifting of one's consciousness to ever-higher states of being. Soul travel is a term Twitchell created.

Eckankar teaches that "spiritual liberation" in one's lifetime is available to all and that it is possible to achieve "Self-realization" (the realization of oneself as Soul) and "God-realization" (the realization of oneself as a "spark" of God) in one's lifetime. The membership card Eckankar followers carry states, "The aim and purpose of Eckankar has always been to take Soul by its own path back to its divine source."

The final spiritual goal of all ECKists is to become conscious "co-workers" with God.

The leader of Eckankar is known as "the Living ECK Master" (LEM). Eckankar claims that only a cisgender man can be the LEM as the Soul needs the structure of a male body in the physical world to become the spiritual leader, a choice made before birth. Eckankar now claims that some leaders—Twitchell and Klemp, for example—also hold the title "Mahanta", which refers to the inner aspect of the teacher. During Gross's ten-year leadership (1971–1981), the organization claimed he was the Mahanta. The leader functions as both an inner and outer guide for each member's spiritual progress.

ECKists believe that contact with a divine spirit, which they call the ECK, can be made via the spiritual exercises of ECK and the guidance of the LEM. It is held that the ECK Masters serve all life irrespective of religious belief. The main Eckankar website includes a list of Masters—some of whom are historical figures.

The Shariyat-Ki-Sugmad, which means "Way of the Eternal", is the holy scripture of Eckankar. It comprises two books of spiritual meaning and purpose written by the Mahanta. A series of Satsang writings are available with yearly membership in Eckankar. Satsang classes are available to study discourses with others and individually.

Beliefs taught in the Shariyat-Ki-Sugmad include "Soul Travel", karma, reincarnation, love, and "Light and Sound". ECKists believe Sugmad is the endless source from which all forms were created and that the ECK, the "Sound Current", flows out of Sugmad and into lower dimensions.

Primary to the teaching is the belief that one may experience the perspective of the Soul beyond the body's limits. Also, the concepts of karma and reincarnation help explain situations in life as the playing out of past causes.

The beliefs that people are responsible for their destiny and that their decisions determine their future are important in Eckankar. Eckankar students meet in open public services and classes to discuss personal experiences, topics, books, and discourses.

== Ceremonies and rites ==
There are few personal requirements to be an ECKist, but certain spiritual practices are recommended. Chief among them is daily practice of the "Spiritual Exercises of ECK" for 15–20 minutes. The most basic ECK spiritual exercise is singing the syllable HU. Various spiritual exercises are offered, and members are encouraged to create their own. Study of ECK books and written discourses, alone or in groups, is also encouraged. There are no dietary requirements, taboos, or enforced ascetic practices.

As part of the teaching, an ECKist can experience several ceremonies, including a Consecration ceremony for initiating the young and infants, a Rite of Passage into adulthood (around age 13), a Wedding ceremony, and a Memorial service.

September 17 is celebrated as Founder's Day in honor of Paul Twitchell. October 22 is celebrated as the spiritual new year.

== Criticism ==
In his 1977 book Introduction to New and Alternative Religions in America, David C. Lane writes:

This lineage, known as the Vairagi masters in Eckankar, allegedly traces its genealogy back through some 970 Living Eck Masters to Rama, an avatar of Vishnu in Hinduism. In other versions, the teachings go even further back to Gakko, a spiritual essence that traveled from the city of Retz on the planet Venus to Earth six million years ago ... In addition, Sudar Singh and Rebazar Tarzs are not genuine historical personages but literary inventions developed by Twitchell to conceal his past associations.

Lane has also suggested that Twitchell, a former Scientologist, incorporated Scientology teachings into Eckankar.

== See also ==
- Ancient Teachings of the Masters
- Contemporary Sant Mat movement
- Marjan Davari
- New religious movement
- Transcendental Meditation
