= Julian Johnson =

American surgeon and author (1867–1939)

Julian P. Johnson

Personal life
- Born: Philip Matthew Johnson; 11 August 1867 USA
- Died: 25 January 1939 (aged 71) Dera Baba Jaimal Singh, Beas, Punjab, British India
- Notable work(s): With a Great Master in India, The Path of the Masters
- Education: University of Chicago (MA), State University of Iowa (MD)
- Known for: Coined term "Audible Life Stream"

Religious life
- Religion: Sant Mat, Radha Soami
- Institute: Radha Soami Satsang Beas
- Initiation: Surat Shabd Yoga; 1931; USA by Sawan Singh through authorised representative

Senior posting
- Teacher: Sawan Singh
- Influenced by: Sawan Singh
- Influenced: Paul Twitchell et al

Julian P. Johnson (1867–1939) was an American surgeon and author of several books on Eastern spirituality. He spent much of 1932 to 1939 in India, was associated with the Radha Soami Satsang Beas spiritual society and Surat Shabd Yoga, and wrote five books (one unpublished) as a result of his experiences.

== Life and career ==
=== Early days and education ===
Johnson grew up in a staunch Christian family in the southern United States, became a Baptist minister at age 17, graduated Bachelor of Divinity in Bolivar, Missouri, and received an appointment as a missionary to India at age 22. Johnson claimed that experiences during his three-year stay in India, however, rendered him surprised by the deep understanding possessed by Indians he had sought to convert, and urged him towards further study.

Back in the United States, he earned an M.A. in theology at the University of Chicago, resigned his 17-year Baptist ministership, and earned an M.D. from the State University of Iowa. He served as an assistant surgeon in the United States Navy during World War I, and later went into private practice. He also owned and flew his own airplanes.

=== Religious studies ===
Over the years, he took to studies of various religious and philosophical teachings, including Christian Science, Freemasonry, New Thought, Rosicrucianism, Spiritualism, Blavatskyan Theosophy, and world religions. His spiritual explorations culminated when he visited an old friend (Julia McQuilkin in Oregon) who was a disciple of Sawan Singh of Beas, India. Convinced that he had found his path, Johnson requested initiation, which was arranged for by Dr. Harold Brock. (Note: Harold Brock, a dentist from Port Angeles, Washington State, and his wife Genevieve were the first Western disciples of Sawan Singh, initiated into Surat Shabd Yoga in 1911 through Sardār Kehr Singh Sasmas.) After a year, Johnson left once more for India on 24 March 1932. (At the two-week stopover in Hawaii, he had discussions on religion with the English Jodo Shinshu priest Ernest "Shinkaku" Hunt [1876–1967] of the Hongwanji.)

=== Move to India ===
Dr. Johnson was the first American to live permanently at the "Dera Baba Jaimal Singh" (the "Tent of Baba Jaimal Singh"), the central colony of the Radha Soami Satsang Beas organization, then in the rural town of Beas in the undivided Panjab province of British India, but now Beas City, East Punjab state. At the "Dera," Johnson was busy with study, writing, some medical work, meditation, and traveling with Sāwan Singh. Johnson edited Sardār Seva Singh's English translation of "Soamiji Maharaj" Shiv Dayal Singh's Sar Bachan. (Note: The book which American religion founder Paul Twitchell described to his future wife Gail thus: "I have a book in my collection called the Sar Bachan written by Sardar Seva Singh, which is the teachings of the Sound Current, and acts as practically my Bible!" —Twitchell, letter of July 8, 1963, in Paul Twitchell, Letters to Gail, volume II, Menlo Park: ECKANKAR, 1977, page 149.) Johnson also coined the term "Audible Life Stream". He wrote five books in all at the Dera, four of which were published: With a Great Master in India (1934, autobiographical), Call of the East (autobiography), The Unquenchable Flame (biography of his wife Elizabeth, written in first person), and his magnum opus The Path of the Masters.

=== Paul Petzoldt ===
In Kashmir, Johnson met Paul Petzoldt (the mountaineer, Outward Bound instructor, and founder of the National Outdoor Leadership School), and invited him to the Dera where Petzoldt received initiation from Johnson's guru, served as Johnson's assistant in the ashram clinic, even helping in surgical operations. Friction occurred after Petzoldt's wife moved from America to join him and then became ill and disillusioned with life in Beās. A tussle with Petzoldt led to the accidental death of Johnson. Petzoldt's version of this occurrence is told in an article by Molly Absolon, "Paul Tells His Story" in The Leader, Fall 1995, NOLS.

For a comprehensive look at how Johnson died see the book, "The Mystery of Dr. Johnson's Death: A Scandal in the Punjab".

=== Elizabeth Rose Bruce ===
Johnson's wife Elizabeth Rose (died 1941) was an American socialite, traveler, adventurer, herbalist, and spiritual seeker. She was a faithful worker of the Radhasoami Satsang, Dayal Bagh, Agra, India, and a disciple of Sir Anand Sarup, Kt, (Note: Given a whole chapter in Paul Brunton's A Search in Secret India (1934).) but eventually left Anand Sarup. Johnson married her and they lived out life in Beās. Johnson wrote her "autobiography" The Unquenchable Flame (Beās: Five Rivers Manufacturing Company, 1935). (Note: In summation, the following were all initiated disciples of "The Great Master" Sāwan Singh (1858–1948): Julian Johnson, Julia McQuilkin, Sardar Kehr Singh Sasmas, Genevieve and Harold Brock, Sardar Seva Singh, Sant Kirpal Singh, Charan Singh, Sant Darshan Singh, and Elizabeth Rose Bruce Johnson. American religion founder Paul Twitchell was initiated by Sant Kirpal Singh. American religious studies scholar David Christopher Lane is an initiate of Charan Singh's, and a deep admirer of Faqir Chand who had made a "radical revision of the teaching on the guru" (—Gold, 1987, page 166).)

== Legacy ==
Johnson remains the most well known among many Western adherents of and authors on Sant Mat / Surat Shabd Yoga. Possibly, no other single author in Sant Mat has more influenced North American "Shabdism" (—David C. Lane's term) than Johnson.

=== The Path of the Masters ===
Johnson's magnum opus, now published as The Path of the Masters: The Science of Surat Shabd Yoga: The Yoga of the Audible Life Stream (but originally titled The Path of the Masters: The Science of Surat Shabda Yoga: Santon ki Shiksha) is a comprehensive, explicit, systematically organised, meticulous, and polished work on the Path of the Soundstream and Lightstream. Published in France (1939), the USA (1957) and India (slightly revised by the Radha Soami Satsang Beas Publications Committee in 1972 and 1985 to delete provocative language, and extensively revised in 1993, (Note: The chapters of editions of 1993 and after have been radically rearranged.)) it remains popular among Western adherents of Sant Mat. However, its author's blunt style and now outmoded opinions – influenced by Northern European racist notions then in vogue but now considered politically incorrect — have turned off some modern readers. The text's sheer eloquence, however, has made the work the object of plagiarism by other writers, especially in the United States, where it used to be almost totally unknown to the general reading public. The work appears to have heavily influenced the American Eckankar (ECK) religion, and its various offshoots and spin-offs, through ECK founder Paul Twitchell's alleged plagiarism – discussed at length and in depth in Prof. David C. Lane's exposé The Making of a Spiritual Movement. (Note: American religious studies professor David Christopher Lane, a pupil of Prof. Mark Juergensmeyer, is known for two achievements: his M.A. thesis Radhasoami Mat: Parampara in Definition and Classification (A Genealogical History of the Gaddi Nasheen Lineages Connected with Shiv Dayal Singh) at the Graduate Theological Union, tracing the lineages that descended from Shiv Dayal Singh (1818–1878) and from Salig Ram (1829–1898), and his documented exposé on Paul Twitchell and his ECK religion. Lane interviewed Sant Darshan Singh (1921–1989) who showed him Twitchell's papers as an initiated disciple of Sant Kirpal Singh (1894–1974), founder of Ruhani Satsang.)

Among Western adherents at least, The Path of the Masters has enjoyed long-time popularity among foreign-language works on Sant Mat. A sampling of Johnson's polished prose (1985 pagination) shows the logic that has proven compelling to Western readers, even outside of Sant Mat circles: (Note: Prof. Lane in The Making of a Spiritual Movement cites several instances. These include the section "Guarding One's Own Mental Processes" from Path of the Masters, chapter 2 (1974–1990 p. 189; 1985 p. 149; 1993 p. 169), which was published verbatim as an article by U.S. occultist Audrey Kargere in Orion Magazine, v. 10, issue 94, Mar–Apr 1965.)

- "... if you live rightly among men, and then devote yourself to the practice of the Surat Shabd Yoga, you will enter the kingdom of heaven while you are still living in the body. And that constitutes a world of difference between the spiritual science of the Masters and all religions." —page 57

- "In the realm of religion, the Master is a paradox. He has no theology, teaches none, yet he is the most religious man on earth. His system is not a religion, yet it leads to the most complete religious experience, and the most happy. He is absolutely universal in all his teachings. He has no creed, yet he never antagonizes any creed, sect or institution. He never condemns any man or any system. He finds no fault with anybody or anything, yet draws the sharpest lines between the good and the bad." —page 162

- "Each and every man, when properly trained, is able to detach himself from the physical body while still living in that body in perfect health, and then travel to all parts of the outlying universe. Everyone has this ability whether he is conscious of it or not." —page 343

- "Vairagya is the next important step in mental preparation for the Path,... This means the mental detachment of oneself from the external world. This is real vairagya. It does not in any way teach or imply that one should physically detach himself from the world. He need not leave his family or society, his public or private duties. The Masters never teach that sort of vairagya.... Detachment, as taught by the Masters, does not imply austerities." —pages 357–358

- "There is but one thing known to human experience which will destroy all lower desires. That is the Audible Life Stream. It is the supreme instrument of deliverance from bondage. It is the one means of detaching us from worldly objects that perish, and of lifting us up to liberty and light.... We shall attain perfect vairagya only when we enter into that divine Stream consciously." —page 364

- "No man ever gained spiritual freedom, power and happiness by a process of logic, by a priori ratiocination, by metaphysics, by reading books or by listening to lectures. Yet these are the methods employed by the majority of mankind. The Masters solve all their problems by a scientific method as exact and exacting as mathematics. They get their information not by analysis and synthesis but by sight and hearing. Even after they have proved a proposition, they establish no authority except that of truth itself. Authority hampers truth, it throttles free investigation. Authority is an enemy to progress.... This science makes personal experience the final and only court of appeal. Its processes are simple and direct. They can be understood by the most ordinary intelligence, and for that reason the intelligentsia need not become offended at them." —page 404

- "The Masters and many of their students pass daily through "the gates of death" and hence they know all of the problems connected with the matter. They have explored worlds upon worlds beyond the gates of death. All of this they do in full consciousness as a direct result of their practice of Surat Shabd Yoga." —page 419

- "In the literature of the Saints, God is expressed by many words, such as Swami, Ekankar, Nirankar, Radhaswami, Akal, Nirala, Anami, Agam, Alakh, Sat Purush, Prabhu, Prabhswami, Hari Ray, Akshar, Parameshwar, Akshar Purush, etc. All of these words have been coined in an effort to convey to human intelligence some idea of what the Saints think of God, or Lord God, the highest power. Ekankar means the “One oneness,” the body of oneness. Nirankar means without body or form. Soami or Swami means the all-pervading Lord. Radha Swami ‒ Radha (soul) and Swami (Lord) ‒ the Lord of the soul ‒ Radha, when reversed, becomes dhara or current. As soul has to revert to its source, so its dhara, when reversed, when its current is turned toward God, becomes Radha. ... The whole universe is considered as one, the true Ekankar." —pages 221–222

== Photos ==
Published photographs of Julian and Elizabeth Rose Johnson include:

- Identification photo of face of Julian Johnson on jackets of With a Great Master in India and The Path of the Masters.
- Small photo captioned: "In front of Dr. Johnson's meditation cave. Dera, 1938. (L-R) Mr. Elliot, Mrs. Indumati Rajwade, Mrs. Johnson, Dr. Johnson." — Maharaj Charan Singh, Spiritual Heritage, Punjab: Radha Soami Satsang Beas, 1983, photographic plate, no page number.
- The same photo immediately above, slightly larger, captioned as: "18. Julian Johnson, on the right, at his meditation cave in Beas" in Juergensmeyer, Radhasoami Reality, page 210.
- The same photo above, on the cover of The Mystery of Dr. Johnson's Death.
- Photo captioned: "Seated, (left to right): Mrs. Johnson; Dr. Pierre Schmidt; the Master; Mrs. Schmidt; Dr. Julian Johnson; and others, 1938." — Glimpses of the Great Master, Hong Kong: Mrs. Cami Moss, June 1986, pages 124–125.
- Photo captioned: "Left to right: Mr. R.C. Mehta; Rani Indumati Rajwade and Mrs. and Dr. Julian Johnson." — Glimpses of the Great Master, page 126.
- Photo captioned: "The Master talking to Mrs. Johnson and disciple." — Glimpses of the Great Master, page 126.
- Photo captioned: "Seated, (left to right): L. Har Narayan; Huzur Maharaj Ji; Sardar R.B. Narain Singh. Standing, (left to right): Mrs. Hilda Korbel; Dr. Julian Johnson; Sardar Bhagat Singh and Mrs. Johnson." — Glimpses of the Great Master, page 127.
- Five photographs in David Lane's The Lost Biography.

== Bibliography ==
- Gold, Daniel (PhD), 1987, The Lord as Guru: Hindi Sants in North Indian Tradition, New York: Oxford University Press, 1987. ISBN 0-19-504339-1
- Guiley, Rosemary Ellen, 1991, Harper's Encyclopedia of Mystical and Paranormal Experience, HarperSanFrancisco, HarperCollins. ISBN 0-06-250366-9
- Johnson, Julian, Call of the East: The Autobiography of an American Surgeon, Lāhore, Pañjāb: Sawan Service League, 1936.
- ___, The Path of the Masters: The Science of Surat Shabd Yoga: The Yoga of the Audible Life Stream, France, 1939; USA, 1957; Beās, East Pañjāb: Radha Soami Satsang Beas, 1972, 1985, 1993. ISBN 81-8256-019-5
- ___, With a Great Master in India, Beās, East Pañjāb: Radha Soami Satsang Beas, 1934, 1982, 1988, 1994. ISBN 81-8256-036-5
- Juergensmeyer, Mark (PhD), 1991, Radhasoami Reality: The Logic of a Modern Faith, Princeton, New Jersey: Princeton University Press. ISBN 0-691-07378-3
- Klemp, Harold, 1989, The Secret Teachings, Crystal, Minnesota: Illuminated Way Publishing. ISBN 0-88155-082-5
- Lane, David Christopher (PhD), The Making of a Spiritual Movement: The Untold Story of Paul Twitchell and Eckankar, Del Mar, California: Del Mar Press, 1990. ISBN 0-9611124-0-9. 1993, ISBN 0-9611124-6-8.
- ___, The Mystery of Dr. Johnson's Death: A Scandal in the Punjab, Mt. San Antonio College, 2017.
- Schomer, Karine (PhD) & William Hewat McLeod (PhD), eds, 1987, The Sants: Studies in a Devotional Tradition of India, Delhi: Motilal Banarsidass, 1987. (Anthology of academic papers presented at the 1978 Berkeley conference on the Sants sponsored by the Graduate Theological Union and the Center for South and Southeast Asia Studies, University of California). ISBN 81-208-0277-2
- Twitchell, Paul, 1971, The Far Country, Menlo Park, California: Illuminated Way Press; Minneapolis: ECKANKAR. ISBN 0-914766-91-0
