= Sirio Carrapa =

Italian teacher (born 1952)

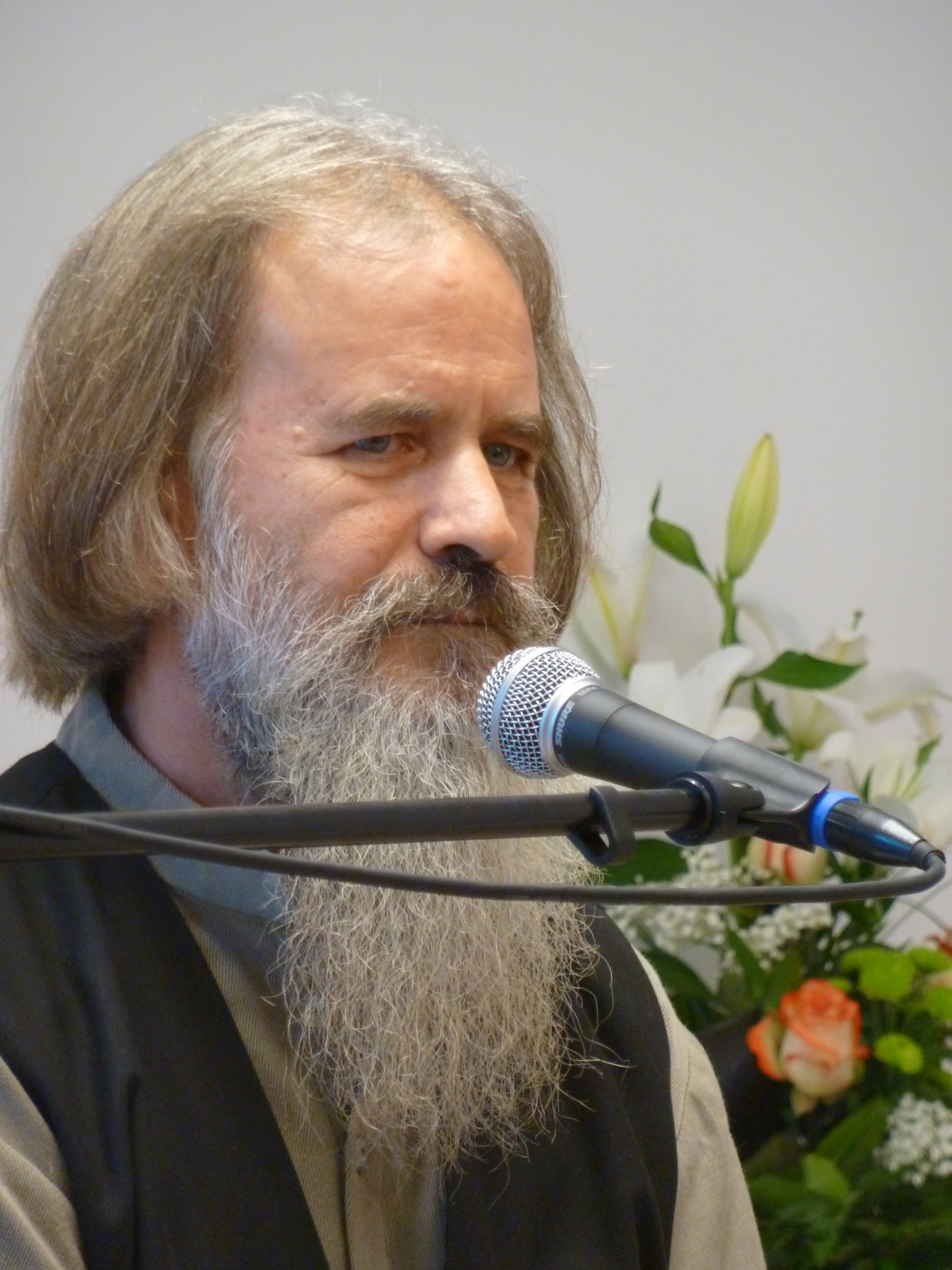
- Carrapa in 2012
- Born: May 12, 1952 (age 74); Borgagne, Italy
- Known for: Guru of Surat Shabd Yoga or Sant Mat

Sirio Carrapa (born 12 May 1952 in Borgagne) is an Italian teacher and practitioner of mysticism and Surat Shabd Yoga in the Sant Mat tradition. He was a disciple of Kirpal Singh and Ajaib Singh.

== Biography ==
He was born on 12 May, in 1952 in Borgagne in Apulia, Italy. In 1979, where he founded the Sant Bani Ashram.

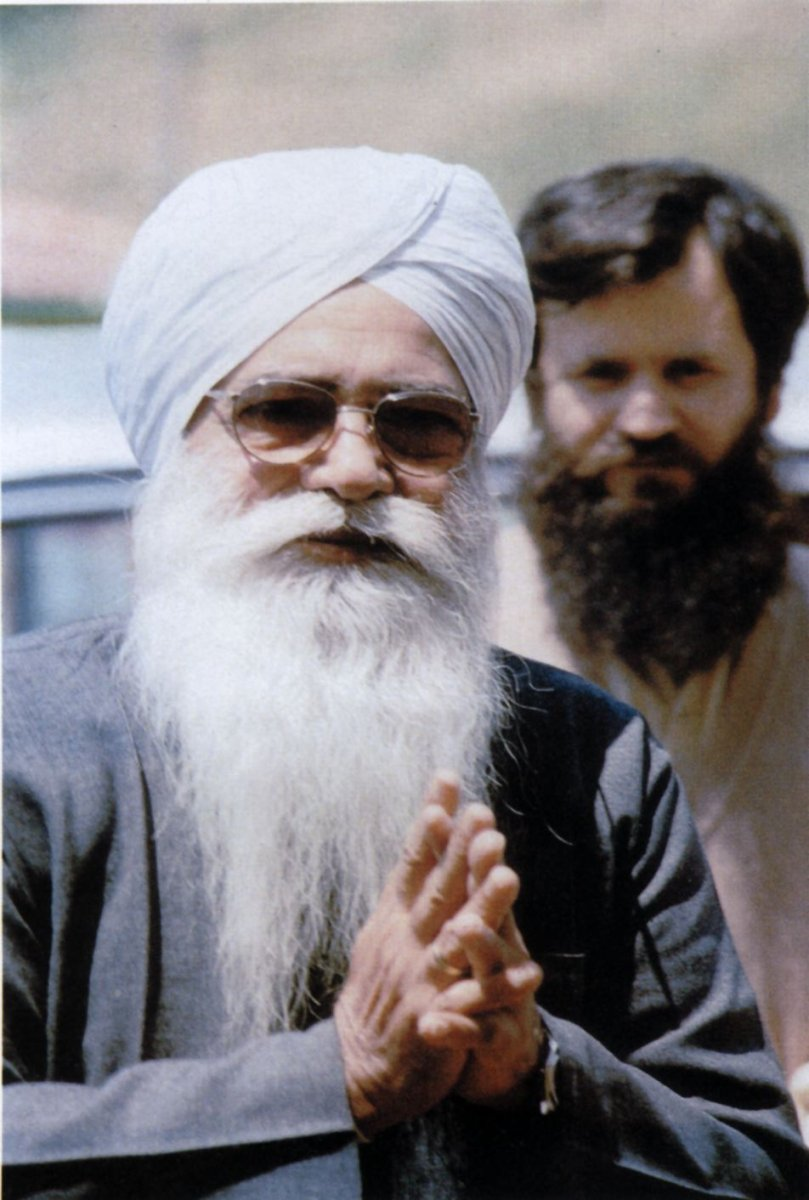
Ajaib Singh and Carrapa in Ribolla

== Bibliography ==
- Il Cammino Verso L'Illuminazione, autobiography and Sant Mat theory, M.I.R. Edizioni (cover) ISBN 8888282556
- Il Roseto dell'Amico, collection of writings and verses of Sirio Carrapa available for download, Creative Common license.
- Nel Giardino dai Melograni in Fiore, collection of poetry and bhajan by Sirio Carrapa. available for download, Creative Common license.
- One Word. One Melody. One Glance, satsang collection in English available for download, Creative Common license.
- Erleuchtungsweg Eines Westlichen Adepten German translation of 'Il Cammino Verso L'Illuminazione'. ISBN 3848201569 ; ISBN 9783848201563
- Tautropfen auf den Rosen und Granatäpfeln im Garten des Freundes: Gedichte und Bhajans German: Stories and poems (bhajans). ISBN 3848203960 ;

ISBN 9783848203963

- Egy Szó. Egy Dallam. Egy Pillantás collection of discourses, lectures, letters and poems in Hungarian. ISBN 9789630855181, published by SBA Books and Könyvműhely Kiadó, December 2012.
- The Rosegarden of the Friend collection of writings and poems. Published by SBA Books, August 2012.
- In the garden with pomegrantes in flower collection of poems. Published by SBA Books, August 2012.
- The Way of the Saints a writing on Surat Shabd Yoga or Sant Mat. Published by SBA Books, August 2012.
