= Thakar Singh =

Sant Mat guru (1929–2005)

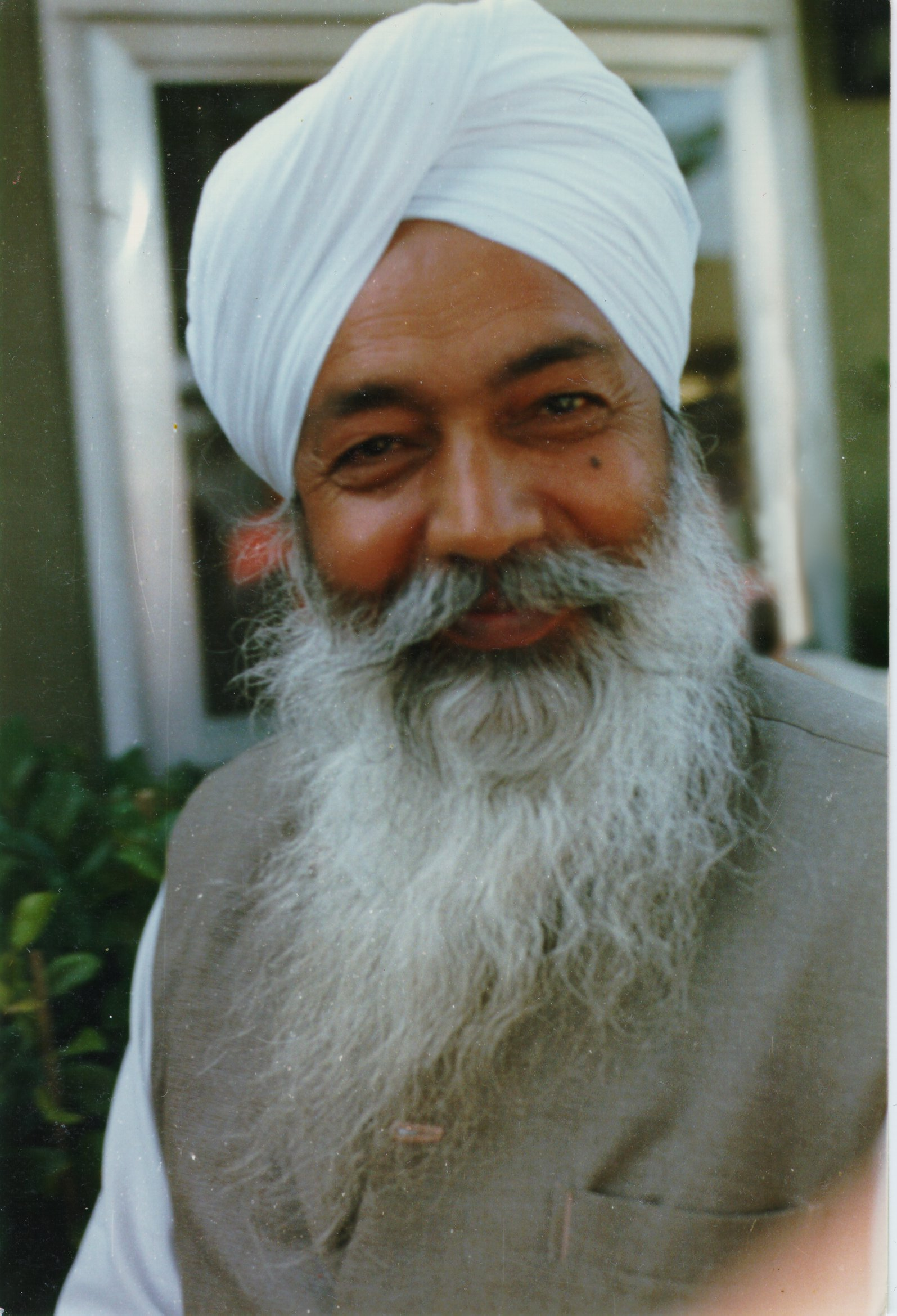
Thakar Singh

Thakar Singh (26 March 1929 – 6 March 2005) was a spiritual teacher in the contemporary Sant Mat lineage of Sant Mat Radha Soami spiritual tradition.

Initiated by Kirpal Singh in 1965, he began work as a Satguru himself in 1976, following the death of Kirpal Singh. Thakar Singh distributed what he paraphrased from Kirpal Singh as, "a practical form of spirituality which is not connected to any particular religion, sect, or thought."

While he was born into Sikhism, and wore the traditional Sikh garb all his life, he gave up its traditional outer practices soon after initiation and devoted himself wholly to the Sant Mat spiritual practices known as Surat Shabd Yoga and Naam. Continuing Kirpal Singh's emphasis on the unity of all religions, Thakar Singh frequently referred to the Bible when addressing Westerners, the Adi Granth, Ramayana and other Indian scriptures in India, and the Qur'an when addressing Muslim people. He gave thousands of talks in his 30 years as a Master, his message being one of transcendence of the material and devotion to God, the "unchangeable permanence behind all things".

== Biography ==
The documentation on Thakar Singh's life is mainly limited to the few details he communicated about himself during his talks and public appearances. A biography composed of stories about the Master was collected by Wendy Heid in 1994, and it touches the central points from the perspective of the inner, spiritual aspirations. It has few points of contact with concrete people, places, or times. Thakar Singh corrected and edited this work. There are also some biographical materials made available by his organisation Know Thyself As Soul, International, although they have few details or specifics and again focus in the main on the inner life.

=== Guruship ===
Kirpal Singh did not publicly name a successor, and after his death in 1974, a number of proposed successors appeared including Darshan Singh (Kirpal Singh's physical son), Ajaib Singh, Soami Divyanand, and others. Thakar Singh began work in the role of Guru at Sawan Asham in Delhi on 7 February 1976. Within four months he travelled to Germany and then later that year to Mexico. In 1979 he visited the United States for the first time. His first American representative was named Bernadine Chard. In July 1981 he visited Canada for the first time.

Thakar Singh was the first Sant Mat Master to visit Africa; he made a five-month tour through the continent from October to February 1989, visiting twelve countries. He also visited the Far East for the first time that year, going to South Korea, the Philippines, Hong Kong, Thailand, and Taiwan during a three-month tour. He visited New Zealand on the same tour. He moved his national headquarters to Nawan Nagar, near the foothills of Himalayas. In April 1992, Thakar Singh went into seclusion about 25 kilometres away in Sai. He did not travel for some years except for brief visits, maintaining an intensive meditation schedule and very simple lifestyle. He visited the United States for the last time in the summer of 2003.

=== Illness and death ===
Thakar Singh died on 6 March 2005 in Nawan Nagar, India, at the age of 76; however, he had been ill for the entire previous year when he underwent open heart surgery in February 2004.
