= Randolph Stone =

Founder of polarity therapy

- Born: Rudolph Bautsch; February 26, 1890; Engelsberg, Austria-Hungary (now Andělská Hora, Czech Republic)
- Died: December 9, 1981 (aged 91); Beas City, Punjab, India

Philosophical work
- Main interests: Osteopathy, Chiropractic, Naturopathy, Naprapathy, Energy medicine
- Notable ideas: Polarity Therapy

Randolph Stone (February 26, 1890 – December 9, 1981) was an Austrian-American chiropractor, osteopath and naturopath who founded polarity therapy, a technique of alternative medicine. He had an interest in philosophy and religions, and encountered Ayurvedic philosophy on a trip to India. His background in chiropractic was shaped by his studies of various Eastern concepts of energy medicine, including Ayurveda, traditional Chinese medicine, yoga, and reflexology.

== Life and work ==
Stone was born Rudolph Bautsch in 1890 in Austria. He immigrated with his family to the United States in 1898 and changed his name to Randolf Stone in the 1920s. During that period, he began studying several different practices and became qualified in chiropractic. Dissatisfied with Western approaches, he also traveled and studied non-Western medical practices. He first published his concepts of polarity therapy in 1947 in a book entitled Energy, and then published a series of books and pamphlets to explain his ideas and methods. He had concluded that an observable (yet undetectable to mainstream scientific methods) 'electromagnetic polarity' was a reflection of health. He held the opinion that this energy was influenced by touch, diet, movement, sound, attitude, relationships and by environmental factors.

He had a successful private practice in Chicago and worked for about ten years in a clinic in India. Stone was initiated into the Radha Soami Satsang Beas tradition under Baba Sawan Singh in 1945 and in 1956 published his Mystical Bible, a Radha Soami interpretation of verses from the Bible. Stone spent the last eight years of his life with his niece Louise Hilger in a house at the Radha Soami center in Beas, India. He died there in 1981.

Stone's ideas have been dismissed by medical health experts as quackery or untestable. They have also been criticized as a discredited form of vitalism. According to Nancy Allison in The Illustrated Encyclopedia of Body-Mind Disciplines, even advocates of Stone's theory consider his books Health Building and Polarity Therapy difficult to read due to their inconsistencies and ambiguities. His ideas are thus interpreted widely, and polarity therapists vary in their approaches. His ideas were later popularized by Pierre Pannetier, a naturopath who had studied under Stone. There are many polarity associations around the world.

== Polarity therapy ==
Stone invented "polarity therapy". It is a type of energy medicine based on the idea that the positive or negative charge of a person's electromagnetic field affects their health. Although Stone promotes it as effective for curing many human ailments, including cancer, the American Cancer Society says "available scientific evidence does not support claims that polarity therapy is effective in treating cancer or any other disease".
