= Sirio =

Sirio may refer to:

- Sirio (album), 2022 album by Lazza
- Sirio Carrapa (born 1952), Italian mystic
- Sirio Maccioni (1932–2020), restaurateur and author based in New York City
- MV Sirio, a Maltese and Panamanian train ferry
- SS Sirio, an Italian immigrant transporter ship, wrecked off Cartagena in 1906
- Sirio, a brand of engines by Italian American Motor Engineering
- Hitachi Sirio is a low-floor tram built by Ansaldobreda
- Lake Sirio, lake in northern Italy
- Sirio-class patrol vessel
- Sirio-class torpedo boat

== See also ==
- Siria
- Sirius (disambiguation)
- Siro (disambiguation)
