= Jasdeep Singh Gill (patron) =

Indian spiritual leader

Jasdeep Singh
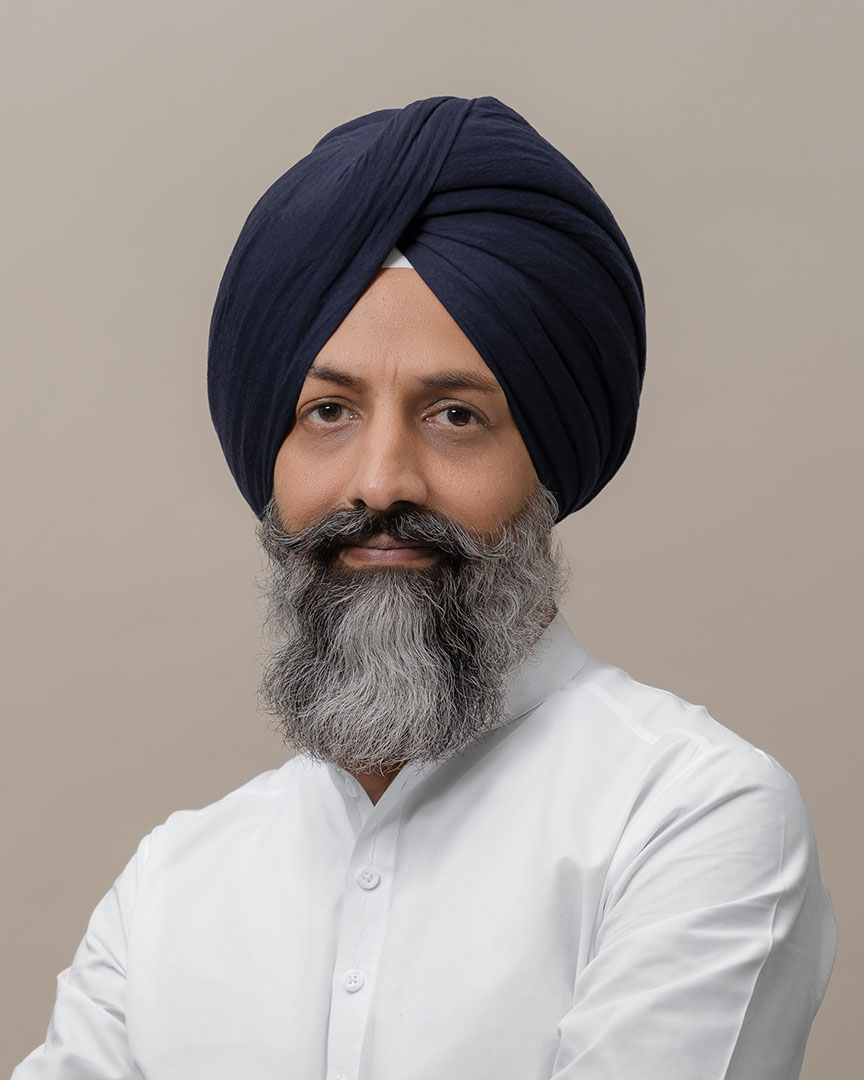
- Jasdeep Singh
- Born: 15 March 1979 (age 47); Amritsar, Punjab, India
- Other name: Hazur
- Education: Indian Institute of Technology Delhi (B.Tech, M.Tech); University of Cambridge (PhD); Massachusetts Institute of Technology (M.S.)
- Known for: Spiritual Head Radha Soami Satsang Beas
- Title: Sant Satguru Designate
- Predecessor: Gurinder Singh

Jasdeep Singh Gill (born 15 March 1979), also known as Hazur, is an Indian spiritual leader and a former pharmaceutical executive. On 2 September 2024, he was appointed as the successor to Gurinder Singh and serves as the Patron and Sant Satguru Designate of Radha Soami Satsang Beas (RSSB), a spiritual organisation based in Punjab, India. Prior to this, Gill had a career in the management consulting and pharmaceutical industries, most recently serving as Chief Strategy Officer at Cipla.

== Early life and family ==
Jasdeep Singh Gill was born on 15 March 1979 in Amritsar, Punjab, India. His grandfather was Sardar Tara Singh, who was amongst the few prominent figures in putting together the SGPC Act of 1925.

His family has been associated with Radha Soami Satsang Beas for several decades. Gill is a distant relative of his predecessor, Gurinder Singh. He is married to a doctor, and the couple resided in Mumbai before his appointment.

== Education ==
Gill’s early education was in a boarding school (Army Public School, Dagshai) driven by values of Army life. Gill completed an integrated B.Tech and M.Tech in Biochemical Engineering and Biotechnology from the Indian Institute of Technology Delhi between 1996 and 2001. In 2000, he achieved the All India Rank-1 in the Graduate Aptitude Test in Engineering (GATE).

He then pursued a PhD in Chemical Engineering from the University of Cambridge, which he completed in 2006. While at Cambridge, he was a member of Churchill College and was selected for the university's Top 100 talent list in 2004. Under the aegis of the Cambridge-MIT Institute he spent a semester at the Massachusetts Institute of Technology as part of the exchange program.

== Career ==
While completing his PhD, Gill was the president and chairman of Cambridge University Entrepreneurs, a student led society, from 2004 to 2006.

After his doctorate, he worked as a consultant for the Monitor Group from 2010 to 2013, where he advised clients on strategy management.

From 2013 to 2019, Gill worked at IQVIA as a Senior Principal. He was later the Consulting Head for South Asia, managing the company's consulting and services business for the region, with a focus on R&D, strategy, market access, and organizational restructuring.

In 2019, he was appointed Chief Strategy Officer at the Indian pharmaceutical company Cipla. He resigned from this position on 15 May 2024.

== Radha Soami Satsang Beas ==
Gill's family has been involved with Radha Soami Satsang Beas for many years.

On 2 September 2024, Gurinder Singh announced Gill as his successor. An official statement confirmed he would assume the role of Patron and Sant Satguru, with the authority to provide spiritual initiation (naam). The appointment made Gill the sixth spiritual head of the organisation since its founding in 1891. All RSSB Masters were chosen by their predecessors during their lifetime. However, this appointment is unique as it was made while the present Master remains active. As part of succession planning, it establishes a streamlined strategy for the future leadership of the organisation.

== See also ==
- Radha Soami Satsang Beas
- Gurinder Singh
- Sant Mat
- Surat Shabd Yoga
- Contemporary Sant Mat movements
- Gurus of Shabdism
