= Jagat Singh (Sant) =

Indian spiritual leader (1884–1951)

- Title: Sant

Personal life
- Born: 27 July 1884 Nussi, Jalandhar, Punjab, British India
- Died: 23 October 1951 (aged 67) Beas, Punjab, India
- Spouse: Mata Sada Kaur
- Children: 1
- Other name: Sardar Bahadur Maharaj Ji
- Occupation: Professor of chemistry (33 years); Spiritual leader of Radha Soami Satsang Beas sect

Religious life
- Religion: Sant Mat, Radha Soami

Senior posting
- Based in: Punjab
- Post: Satguru
- Period in office: 1948–1951
- Predecessor: Sawan Singh
- Successor: Charan Singh
- Website: www.rssb.org

Jagat Singh (1884–1951) was an Indian spiritual leader and the head of Radha Soami Satsang Beas. He served as the guru for Beas Dera for three years, until his death in 1951 at the age of 67. He worked as a college chemistry professor at an Agricultural College and was honoured for his service by the British as Sardar Bahadur. After retirement he was chosen by his spiritual master to be his successor, becoming the third spiritual head of Radha Soami Satsang Beas. Jagat Singh assigned the duties of his successor and guru to his initiate Charan Singh.

== Background ==
Jagat Singh was born on 27 July 1884 into a family of prosperous and religious Jat Sikh farmers, in the small village of Nussi in the Jalandhar District of the Punjab, India. His parents were Sardar Bhola Singh, a farmer, and Mata Nand Kaur. His Mother, Mata Nand Kaur died when Jagat Singh was five years old. He was raised by his father's aunt (stepmother) Bibi Rukmani Kaur. He received his initial education in the Christian Mission School at Jalandhar. He then passed his MSc degree in Chemistry at the Government College of Lahore. He joined the Punjab Agricultural College, Lyallpur, in 1911 as Assistant Professor of Chemistry and retired as Vice Principal of the institution in 1943 receiving the title Sardar Bahadur for his thirty-two years of meritorious service.

== Spiritual path ==
In Abbottabad on 28 December 1910 at the age of twenty-six, he was initiated into the meditation practice of Surat Shabd Yoga (also known as Nam Bhakti) by Sawan Singh. He had gone there with his cousin Sardar Bhagat Singh Kaler and the Judge Rai Sahib Munshi Ram to hear his future guru, who was still in service there, deliver satsang. Throughout his own career as a college professor he made it a point to spend most of his weekends with his guru Hazur Maharaj Sawan Singh at the Dera and to spend most of his time in the Surat Shabd Yoga meditation practice. After his retirement in 1943, he lived permanently at Radha Soami Satsang Beas.

He was once described by the Muslim mystic Sain Lasoori Shah of Lyallpur as a "perfect disciple" who became a "perfect Master".

== Death and successor ==
He died on the morning of 23 October 1951. Before he died he appointed Charan Singh as his spiritual successor in a written will.

== Books ==
He wrote following books.

- The Science of the Soul (English)
- Discourses on Sant Mat II (English)
