= Ajaib Singh =

Indian religious teacher (1926–1997)

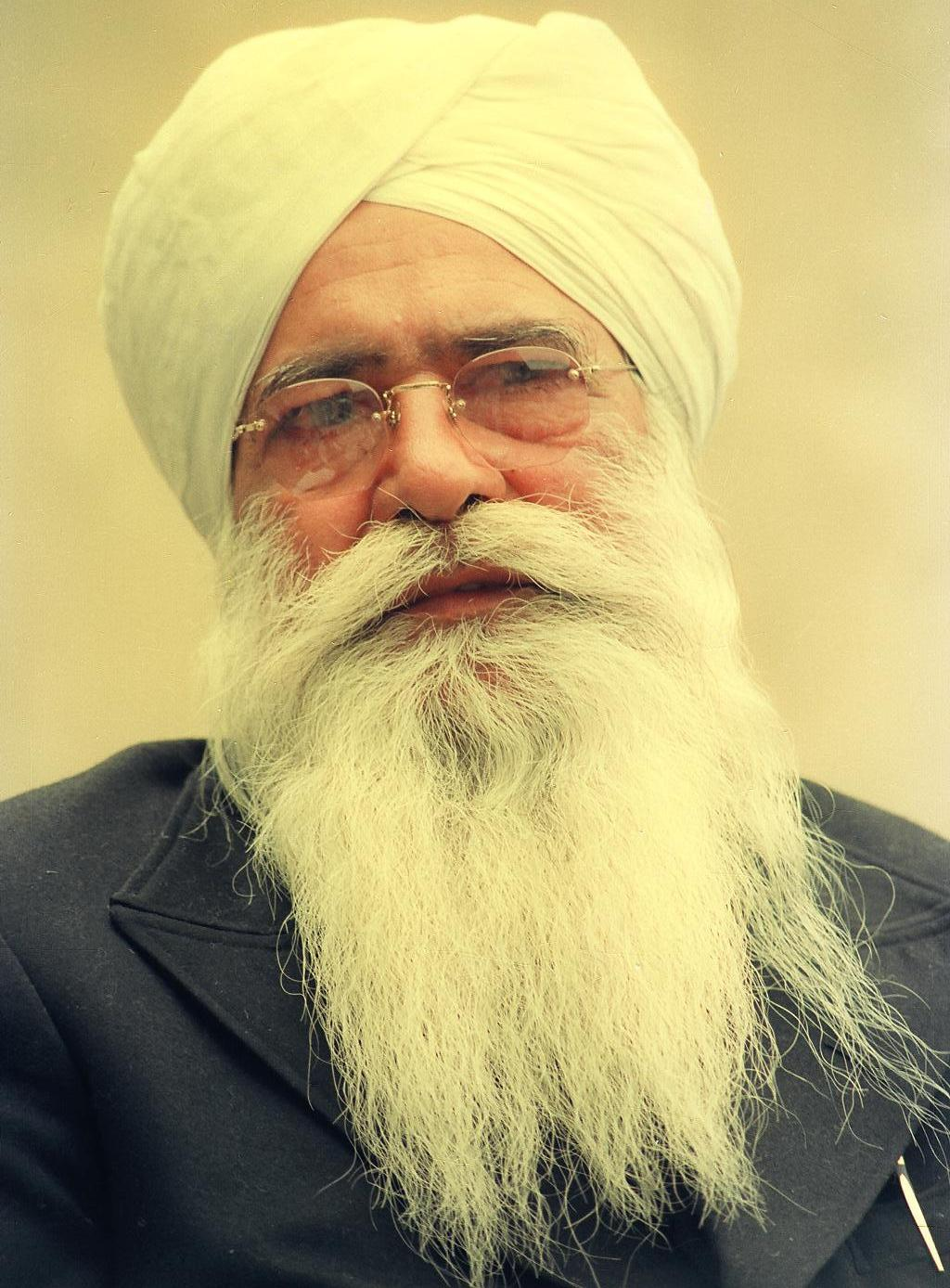
- Born: September 11, 1926; Maina (Mehna), Bathinda district, Punjab, British India
- Died: July 6, 1997 (aged 70)
- Known for: Satguru of Surat Shabd Yoga, Sant Mat Radha Soami
- Title: Sant

Sant Satguru Ajaib Singh, also known to his disciples as 'Sant Ji' was the spiritual master in Sant Mat Radha Soami spiritual tradition. He was born September 11, 1926, in Maina (Mehna), District Bhatinda, Punjab, India.

During his satsangs, Sant Ajaib Singh Ji would often talk about his youth - his study and search for the God of the guru granth sahib, his life with his adopted parents, and the time he spent with his first mahatma, Bishan Das. While serving in the Indian army, Sant would later meet with Baba Sawan Singh and describe the impact that Hazur Maharaj Baba Sawan Singh had on his life, referring to Baba Sawan Singh as "the most beautiful man I have ever met."

As conferred by Baba Sawan Singh, Sant Ji would also discuss his long-awaited and long anticipated meeting with his second Master, Kirpal Singh, and the orders he received regarding leaving his worldly possessions behind (including a large ashram at Khuni Chak) and being directed to meditate in an underground room.

In addition to the publication of many of his talks and question/answer sessions by Sant Bani Press, Sant Ji was responsible for the 1982 English language translation of Kabir Sahib's story of creation, entitled The Anurag Sagar or Ocean of Love. He oversaw the extensive footnoting of the Sagar, and would occasionally joke about how he, an unlearned farmer, had managed to complete this work.

A disciple, Bar Bar Baba Ji, claimed that during satsang at SKA, India, February 1997, Sant Ajaib Singh Ji told a group of his Western followers, "I will not be seeing any of you anymore".

Sant Ji is the 18th Guru in the main line of Saints and Mahatmas dating back to Kabir, a practice referred to as Sant Mat or Surat Shabd Yoga. This lineage also includes such spiritual luminaries as Guru Nanak, Guru Arjan Dev, Shiv Dayal Singh, Jaimal Singh, Sawan Singh and Kirpal Singh.

Over a 22-year period, he initiated approximately 33,000 disciples, travelling extensively across North and South America, Europe, Africa and India.

Sant Ajaib Singh Ji died on July 6, 1997.
