= Ghoman, Gurdaspur =

Village in Gurdaspur district of Punjab, India

Coordinates: 31°41′22″N 75°22′49″E

Ghoman, also spelt as Ghuman, is a village in Tehsil Sri Hargobindpur of Gurdaspur district of Punjab, India. The village lies 44 kilometres south of the Gurdaspur District Headquarters, about 10 kilometres west of Sri Hargobindpur. The village is now famous as a town due to substantial business expansion. Ghoman is also famous for presence of Radhasoami population. Postal Index Number of Ghoman is 143514.

== Namdev shrine ==
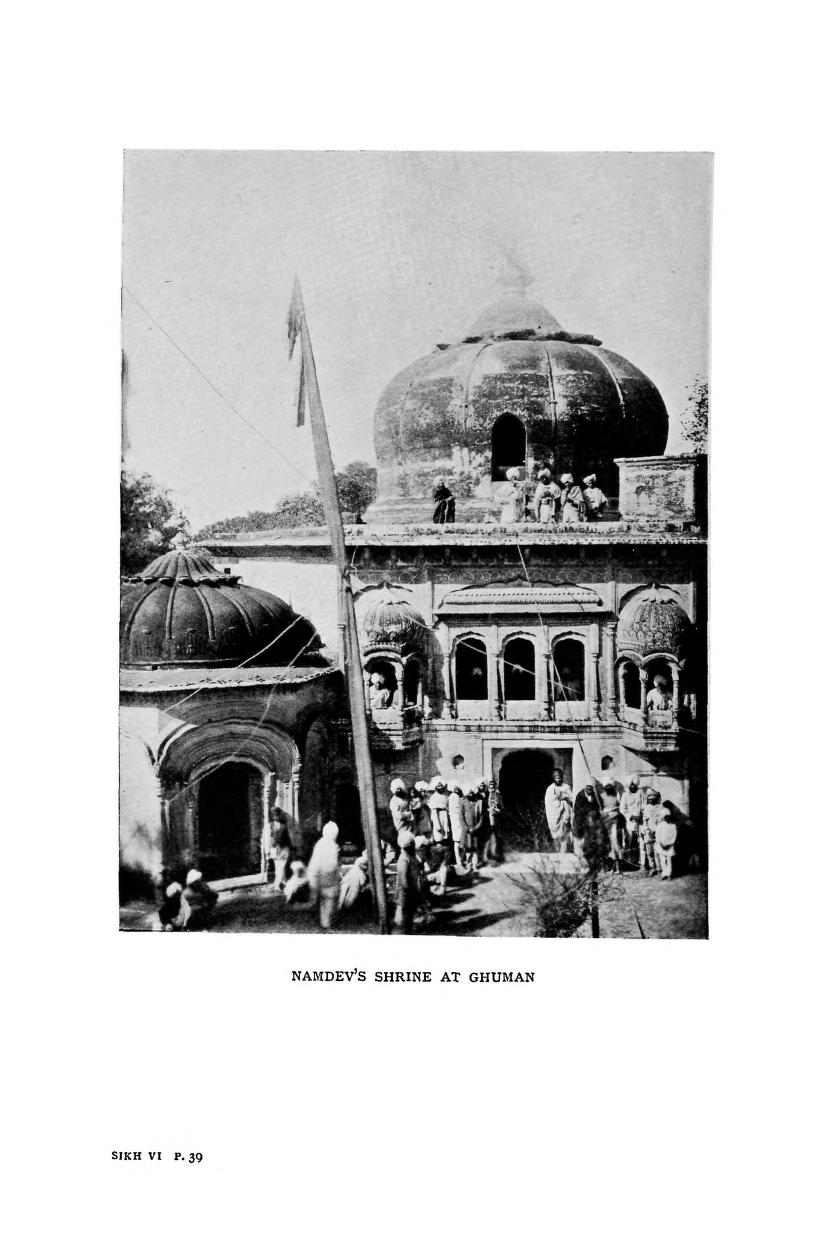
Photograph of the shrine of Bhagat Namdev in Ghuman, as published in 'The Sikh Religion' (1909)

A shrine there is dedicated to Namdev, a Bhakti saint, and is believed by the villagers to represent the place where he was cremated after his travels from Maharashtra. The tradition, which also says that he spent the last 20 years of his life in that village, is not universally accepted. Several families in Ghoman, particularly from the Ghuman Jat clan, have historically served as sevadars (volunteers) and granthis (religious custodians) at the shrine of Bhagat Namdev. Among them, families with the honorific surname "Bawa" are recognized for their longstanding spiritual service and leadership in maintaining the traditions of the Tapiana Sahib Gurdwara. The shrine of Namdev contained murals dating to the late 18th century.

== Bawa Families ==
The surname "Bawa" is used by several families in Ghuman to denote respect and spiritual service. Among the Ghuman Jat clan, the Bawa families have historically held roles as granthis (scripture readers), sevadars (volunteers), and custodians of the Gurdwara Tapiana Sahib, the shrine of Bhagat Namdev Ji.

The title "Bawa" is considered an honorific, rather than a caste marker, and reflects a lineage of devotion, religious duty, and leadership in maintaining the traditions of the shrine. These families trace their roots through the Ghuman (Ghumman) clan, which has historical connections to the Janjua Rajput lineage.

Descendants of the Bawa families continue to maintain ties with Ghuman, even as many have migrated to urban centers and abroad. They often return during religious gatherings and melas held at the Tapiana Sahib shrine.

== Location ==
The village lies about 10 km from Sri Hargobindpur, and about 25 km from Batala.

Closest nearby villages are Pandori (2 km), Kaure (2 km), Bhattiwal (3 km), Sakhowal (3 km), Dakoha, Veela Bajju, Cheema, Sukala, Bariar, Nawan Pind, Mandiala.

== Notable people ==
- Baba Jaimal Singh Ji Maharaj - Founder and first Satguru of Radha Soami Satsang Beas.
- Bhagat Namdev- Bhakti-movement saint, spent later parts of his life at Ghoman.
