= Jasdeep Singh =

Jasdeep Singh may refer to:

- Jessy Singh (born 1993), an American cricketer
- Jasdeep "Jessy" Singh (born 1993), Indian-American cricketer
- Jasdeep Singh Gill or Jassie Gill (born 1988), Indian singer, live performer and actor
- Jasdeep Singh Gill (patron) (born 1979), patron of Radha Soami Satsang Beas
