= Gurinder Singh =

Radha Soami Satsang Beas guru (born 1954)

Gurinder Singh Dhillon
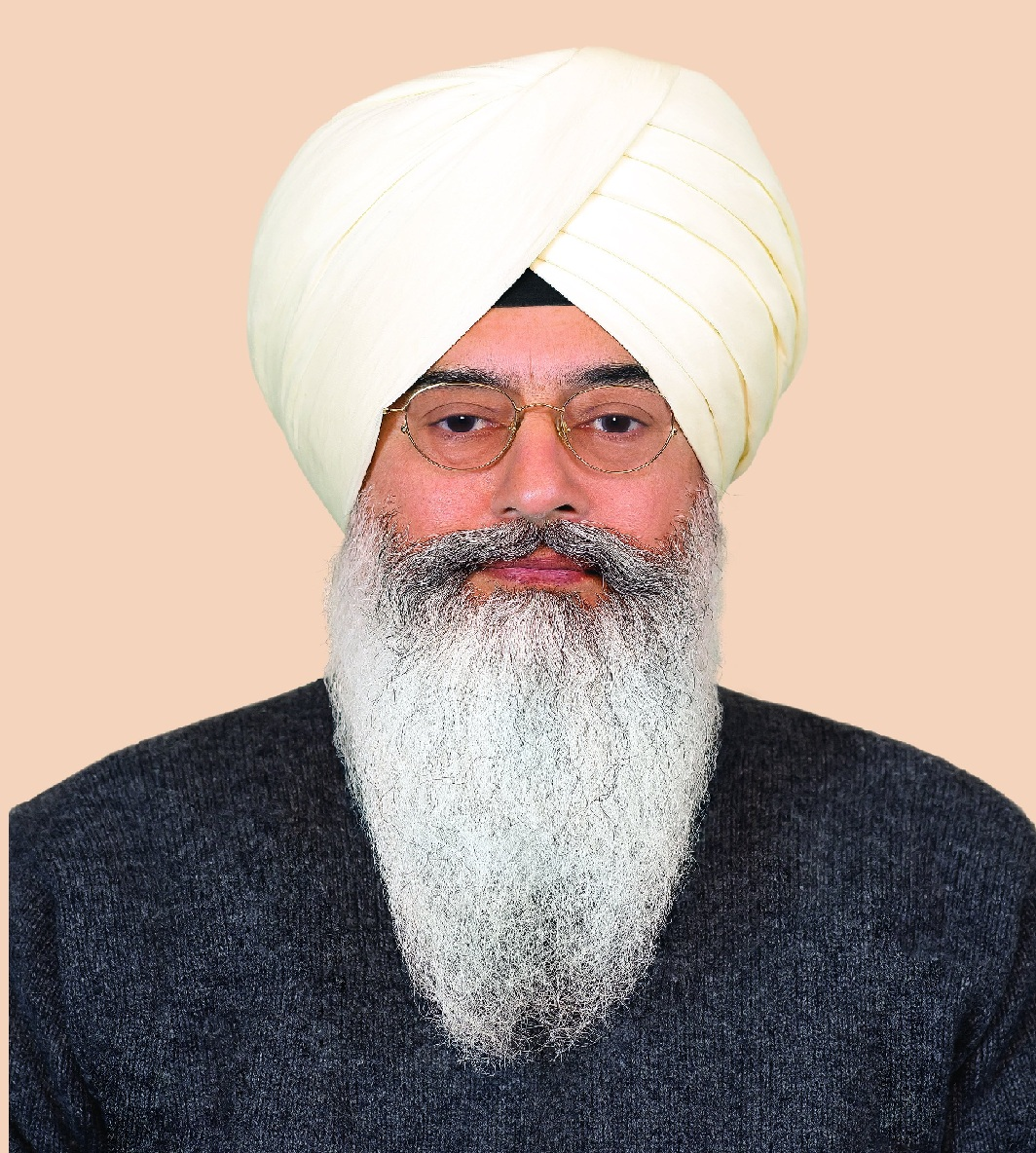

Personal life
- Born: 1 August 1954 (age 72) Moga, Punjab
- Spouse: Shabnam Dhillon (died 2019)
- Children: 2
- Other name: Baba Ji
- Website: www.rssb.org

Religious life
- Religion: Sant Mat Radha Soami

Senior posting
- Post: Sant
- Period in office: 1990–present
- Predecessor: Charan Singh

Gurinder Singh Dhillon (born 1 August 1954), also known as Baba Ji to his followers, is the spiritual head of Radha Soami Satsang Beas (RSSB). He succeeded Charan Singh, his uncle, in 1990.

== Biography ==
Gurinder Singh was born on 1 August 1954 into a family of the Dhillon clan who were followers of the Radha Soami Satsang Beas. His parents were Gurmukh Singh Dhillon and Mahinder Kaur.

He was educated at the Lawrence School, Sanawar, in the Shimla Hills of Himachal Pradesh and obtained his bachelor's degree in Commerce from Panjab University, Chandigarh. He was in Spain working before returning to India to accept his nomination as the next spiritual head of RSSB in 1990. He has two sons, namely Gurpreet Singh Dhillon and Gurkirat Singh Dhillon.

== Spiritual discourses ==
The Dera, located in Beas, Punjab, is the designated home of the organisation's spiritual leader. Large crowds visit on selected days, usually weekends, to hear discourses from him. He also gives Satsang at other major centres of RSSB in India. He tours the various RSSB centres outside of India during April to August.
