= Sawan Singh =

Second Satguru of Radha Soami Satsang Beas

Personal life
- Born: 27 July 1858 Jatana, Punjab Province, British India
- Died: 2 April 1948 (aged 89) Dera Baba Jaimal Singh, Beās, Pañjāb, Dominion of India
- Spouse: Mata Kishan Kaur
- Children: 3
- Citizenship: British Indian
- Education: Thomason College of Civil Engineering
- Known for: Developed Dera Baba Jaimal Singh colony
- Occupation: Civil Engineer, Military Engineering Service Sikh Regiment No. 14(Up to 28 years) and later spiritual leader of Radha Soami Satsang Beas sect
- Website: https://www.rssb.org/

Religious life
- Religion: Sant Mat, Radha Soami
- Institute: Radha Soami Satsang Beas

Senior posting
- Post: Sant, Satguru
- Period in office: 1903–48
- Predecessor: Jaimal Singh
- Successor: Jagat Singh
- Influenced by: Jaimal Singh
- Influenced: Jagat Singh, Charan Singh, Julian Johnson, Kirpal Singh

Sawan Singh (27 July 1858 - 2 April 1948), also known as The Great Master or Bade Maharaj ji, was an Indian Saint or Sant. He was the second spiritual head of Radha Soami Satsang Beas (RSSB) from the death of Jaimal Singh in 1903 until his own death on 2 April 1948.

Before he died, he appointed Jagat Singh as his spiritual successor.

== Honorifics ==
Although he did not refer to himself with these, the following appellations and honorifics have been used to refer to Sawan Singh:

- Bade Maharaj Ji
- Hazur Maharaj
- Sawan Shah
- The Great Master
- Hazur Baba Sawan Singh Ji Maharaj

== Life ==
Sawan Singh Grewal was born into a Grewal Jat Sikh family in his mother's home at the village of Jatana, District Ludhiana, in pre-partition Punjab. Sawan Singhs ancestral village was Mehma Singh Wala, District Ludhiana in Punjab. His father was Subedar Major Sardar Kabal Singh Grewal and his mother was Mata Jiwani Kaur. He was married to Mata Kishan Kaur and together they had three children. He passed engineering at Thomason College of Civil Engineering, Roorkee and later joined the Military Engineering Service.

He studied scriptures of various religions but retained a strong connection with the Gurbani of the Sikh religion.

He had contact with a mystic of Peshawar named Baba Kahan who he hoped to get initiation from but was refused:

"I associated with him for several months and during that time he showed supernatural powers on several occasions. When I asked him if he would shower grace upon me by initiating me, he answered: 'No, he is somebody else; I do not have your share'. I then asked him to tell me who that person was so that I could contact him. He replied: 'When the time comes, he will himself find you'."

Later when Sawan Singh was stationed at Murree, he met Jaimal Singh, who said to his companion that he had come to initiate Sawan Singh. After much philosophical debate, discussion and several conferences with Jaimal Singh, Sawan Singh became thoroughly convinced and received initiation from Jaimal Singh into the practice of surat shabd yoga on the 15th day of October 1894.

Sawan Singh retired on government pension in 1911 to Dera Baba Jaimal Singh (Beas), the "camp of Baba Jaimal Singh" where Jaimal Singh had settled in 1891. During his ministry the Dera expanded greatly, with houses for both permanent residents and guests, a library and a Satsang Hall. Sawan Singh sheltered victims of the communal holocaust of the Partition of India. His following included Hindus, Muslims, Sikhs, Christians, and for the first time, thousands from abroad. He had initiates from America, England, Switzerland, Germany, most notable of whom being the Americans physician-surgeon Julian Johnson and chiropractic-osteopath Randolph Stone and the Swiss physician-homeopath Pierre Schmidt.

== Books ==
He wrote following books.

- Tales of the Mystic East (English)
- Spiritual Gems (English)
- Philosophy of the Masters (English) (five volumes)
- My Submission (English)
- Discourses on Sant Mat (English)
- The Dawn of Light (English)
- Shabd Ki Mahima Ke Shabd

== See also ==
- Radha Soami
- Surat Shabd Yoga
- Shiv Dayal Singh
- Charan Singh
- Kirpal Singh
