= Radha Soami Satsang Beas =

Spiritual organisation in India

- Formation: 1891
- Founder: Jaimal Singh
- Type: Spiritual organisation Non-profit
- Headquarters: Dera Baba Jaimal Singh, Beas, Punjab, India
- Spiritual Head: Gurinder Singh
- Satguru Designate: Jasdeep Singh Gill
- Website: www.rssb.org

Radha Soami Satsang Beas (RSSB) is a spiritual organisation in the Sant Mat tradition founded in Punjab, India, in 1891. Its main centre is Dera Baba Jaimal Singh, located on the banks of the Beas River. The organisation is one of the largest branches of the Radha Soami movement and is currently led by its spiritual heads Gurinder Singh Dhillon and Jasdeep Singh Gill.

The core of the RSSB teachings is based on the principle that a living spiritual master, or Satguru, is essential for guiding the soul back to its divine source. The primary spiritual practice is a form of meditation known as Surat Shabd Yoga, which involves connecting the soul with the Shabd, or the inner Sound Current. Followers are initiated into the practice and commit to never divulge details of their initiations, not even to their children. They lead disciplined lifestyles which include daily meditation, a lacto-vegetarian diet, abstinence from intoxicants, and high moral values, while continuing to live and work in the world.

The organisation's headquarters at Beas has grown from a small settlement into a large, self-sufficient township that accommodates hundreds of thousands of visitors during spiritual gatherings. RSSB has a global presence, with thousands of centres in over 90 countries. It also engages in extensive charitable work, operating free hospitals, providing disaster relief, and running community services.

== History ==
=== Founding and early years (1891–1903) ===
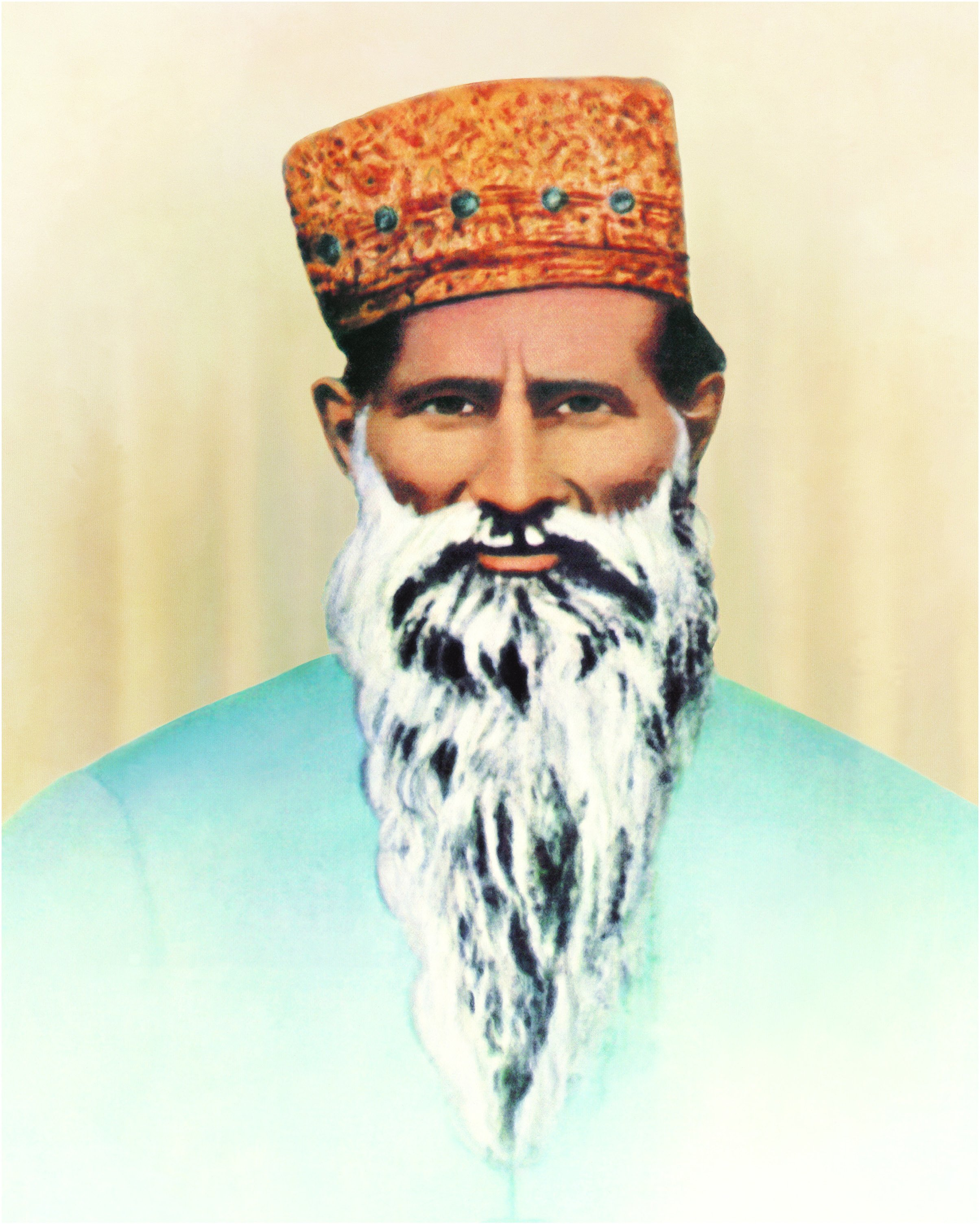
Shiv Dayal Singh, the founder of the Radha Soami faith, whose disciple Jaimal Singh established the centre at Beas.

The origins of Radha Soami Satsang Beas trace back to 1891, when Jaimal Singh, a disciple of Shiv Dayal Singh (the founder of the Radha Soami faith, who began teaching in Agra in 1861), settled on the west bank of the Beas River after retiring from the British Indian Army. Jaimal Singh had been initiated into the faith by Shiv Dayal Singh in 1856 and, following his guru's death in 1878, was instructed by him to carry the teachings to the Punjab. He chose the desolate and isolated site at Beas for its solitude and began his spiritual mission by building a simple mud hut in which to live and meditate. As news of his presence spread, a small group of followers (a sangat) formed, and he began holding spiritual discourses (satsangs).

The physical foundation of the spiritual colony, which came to be known as the Dera Baba Jaimal Singh, was established in 1898 when Sawan Singh, a civil engineer and Jaimal Singh's eventual successor, constructed the first community well and subsequently, a small satsang hall and guest rooms. By the time of Jaimal Singh's death in 1903, he had initiated over two thousand followers, establishing a firm foundation for the community.

=== Growth under Sawan Singh (1903–1948) ===
Sawan Singh, known as the "Great Master," succeeded Jaimal Singh in 1903. An engineer by profession, he applied his organisational skills to oversee the Dera's development for 45 years. Under his leadership, the settlement grew into a well-established village, and the following expansion significantly attracted disciples from across India and abroad. He personally designed a large new satsang hall, which was completed in 1937. Though the rapid growth of the congregation soon required discourses to be held outdoors once again. During the Partition of India in 1947, he provided shelter and aid to refugees of all faiths at the Dera.

Sawan Singh died on 2 April 1948, having nominated his successor through a written will dated 20 March 1948 — the first time a Beas Master had used a formal will to designate a successor. The will named Sardar Bahadur Jagat Singh, a retired professor of chemistry, as spiritual head of the Dera and all its affiliated satsangs.

=== 1948 succession and schism ===
Although Jagat Singh was formally installed on the gurgaddi on 13 April 1948 in the presence of Sawan Singh's family and representatives of the Tarn Taran and Dayalbagh centres, Sawan Singh's death also produced a succession dispute. Beas records show that Jagat Singh alone was authorised to initiate disciples and establish new centres; nevertheless, several of Sawan Singh's disciples claimed an inner or verbal mandate from the late Master and founded independent centres in his name. The most prominent of these offshoots were:

- Ruhani Satsang, founded in Delhi in 1948 by Kirpal Singh (1894–1974), a retired military accounts officer whom Sawan Singh had initiated in 1924. Kirpal Singh asserted that Sawan Singh had verbally entrusted him with the mission in December 1947, a claim not recorded in the Beas will; he renamed his fellowship "Ruhani Satsang" rather than using the traditional "Radha Soami" name.
- Dera Sacha Sauda, established at Sirsa, Haryana on 29 April 1948 by Mastana Balochistani (c. 1891–1960), a disciple of Sawan Singh who had been initiated at Beas in 1920.
- Saidpur centre, founded in 1948 by Teja Singh, a disciple of Sawan Singh initiated in 1923, who established "Asli Dera Baba Sawan Singh" at village Saidpur, District Amritsar.

Together with the earlier-founded Tarn Taran centre established in 1900 by Bagga Singh (a disciple of Jaimal Singh), these splinter groups produced a total of thirteen independent centres in Punjab, Haryana and Delhi by 1974. Although the leaders of the splinter centres operated independently, they maintained cordial relations with Beas and continued to revere Sawan Singh as their spiritual master.

=== Jagat Singh and Charan Singh (1948–1990) ===
Jagat Singh, a retired chemistry professor, led the Dera for three years, a brief tenure marked by the difficult post-partition period, during which he continued the Dera's humanitarian work. Before his death on 23 October 1951, Jagat Singh appointed Charan Singh — a lawyer, the grandson of Sawan Singh, and Jagat Singh's initiate — as his successor through a written will dated 22 October 1951.

Charan Singh led the organisation for nearly four decades, a period of profound transformation. In 1957, he registered Radha Soami Satsang Beas as a non-profit society. This pivotal move shifted the organisation from a traditional structure, where assets were held by the living Master, to a modern, legally secure framework that separated spiritual and administrative responsibilities. Under his direction, the Dera grew into a large, self-sufficient township. This expansion was powered by massive volunteer efforts, such as the mitti seva (earth-moving service) of the 1950s, where thousands of volunteers manually levelled large ravines to expand the community kitchen (langar). He also actively worked to dissolve caste distinctions within the community by personally sitting and eating with all members of the congregation, reinforcing the teaching of equality. During his tenure, the organisation expanded globally, establishing a presence in over 90 countries.

=== Gurinder Singh era (1990–2024) ===
Gurinder Singh was appointed successor in 1990 — named through the will of Charan Singh, who died on 1 June 1990 — and continued to lead the organisation's expansion. Born on 1 August 1954, Gurinder Singh was the son of Gurmukh Singh Dhillon and Mohinder Kaur — Charan Singh's sister, and a daughter of Harbans Singh Grewal, the youngest son of Sawan Singh — making him a great-grandson of the second Beas Master. At the time of his appointment, he was serving the RSSB centre in Malaga, Spain. His tenure was marked by significant infrastructural development at the Dera to accommodate the ever-growing number of followers, including the construction of the current main satsang venue, which can hold up to 500,000 people.

=== 2024 succession ===
On 2 September 2024, in a departure from the tradition of naming a successor only shortly before the Master's passing, Gurinder Singh nominated Jasdeep Singh Gill as Patron and Sant Satguru Designate of all RSSB societies, with immediate effect. Gill, aged 45 at the time of his appointment, holds a PhD in chemical engineering from the University of Cambridge and had previously served as Chief Scientific Officer at the pharmaceutical firm Cipla. Gurinder Singh continues as spiritual head during the transition period. Like his two immediate predecessors, Gill is a blood descendant of Sawan Singh: he is the grandson of Gurinder Singh's masi (maternal aunt), making him a first cousin once removed of Gurinder Singh and a great-nephew of Charan Singh. Thus, while RSSB succession is formally by spiritual appointment rather than hereditary right, the last three Masters — Charan Singh, Gurinder Singh, and Jasdeep Singh Gill — have all been descendants of the second Beas Master, Sawan Singh.

== Beliefs and teachings ==
The philosophy of Radha Soami Satsang Beas is part of the Sant Mat tradition, which advocates an inner path of spiritual discovery. The teachings are presented not as a religion, but as a science of the soul that can be practised by people of any faith without conflict with their religious identity. The ultimate goal is jivanmukti, or liberation of the soul from the cycle of reincarnation, leading to its return to its divine origin.

=== God, the soul, and the sound current ===
The core philosophy is based on the belief in a single, formless God from which the entire creation has emanated. Central to this belief is the concept of the Shabd, or the Sound Current, also known as Naam (the Word). The Shabd is described as the primordial creative power—the dynamic force of God that is the source and sustenance of all existence. It is not an audible sound in the physical sense but a subtle inner vibration or divine melody that the soul can perceive when its attention is withdrawn from the external world. This inner Sound is considered the direct path leading back to God.

According to the teachings, the soul is a particle of the divine that has become separated and is now entrapped in the material world by karma and the cycle of reincarnation. The human form is considered a rare opportunity for the soul to achieve spiritual liberation and return to its source.

=== The role of the living master ===
The teachings place critical importance on the necessity of a living spiritual Master, or Satguru. The Master is not worshipped as God, but is revered as a guide who has completed the spiritual journey and can lead others along the same path. It is believed that only a living Master can provide the essential connection to the Shabd. This connection is given during a formal initiation (naam dan), where the Master provides instruction on the meditation technique and is said to link the disciple's soul to the inner Sound Current, taking responsibility for guiding it on its journey homeward.

=== The spiritual path ===
The practical application of the teachings is centred on the meditation practice of Surat Shabd Yoga, which means "the union of the soul with the Sound Current". To support this inner practice, disciples commit to an ethical lifestyle intended to cultivate the discipline and purity necessary for spiritual progress. The path includes four key elements:

1. A lacto-vegetarian diet, which excludes meat, fish, fowl, and eggs. This is based on the principle of non-violence (ahimsa).
2. Abstinence from intoxicants, including alcohol and recreational drugs, to maintain mental clarity.
3. A moral and ethical life, earning a livelihood through honest means and dealing fairly with others.
4. A commitment to daily meditation for two and a half hours.

In addition to this individual discipline, the path is supported by community practices, including attending satsang (spiritual discourses) and performing seva (selfless service), which is intended to foster humility and devotion.

== Spiritual masters ==
The spiritual leadership of Radha Soami Satsang Beas is passed down through a lineage of Masters, known as the Sant Satgurus. Succession is determined by appointment from the reigning Master, not by hereditary right, though some Masters have been related.

=== Lineage of masters ===
- Jaimal Singh (1839–1903) was the founder and first Master. After retiring from the British Indian Army, he established the spiritual colony at Beas, living a simple, meditative life that gradually attracted his first followers.

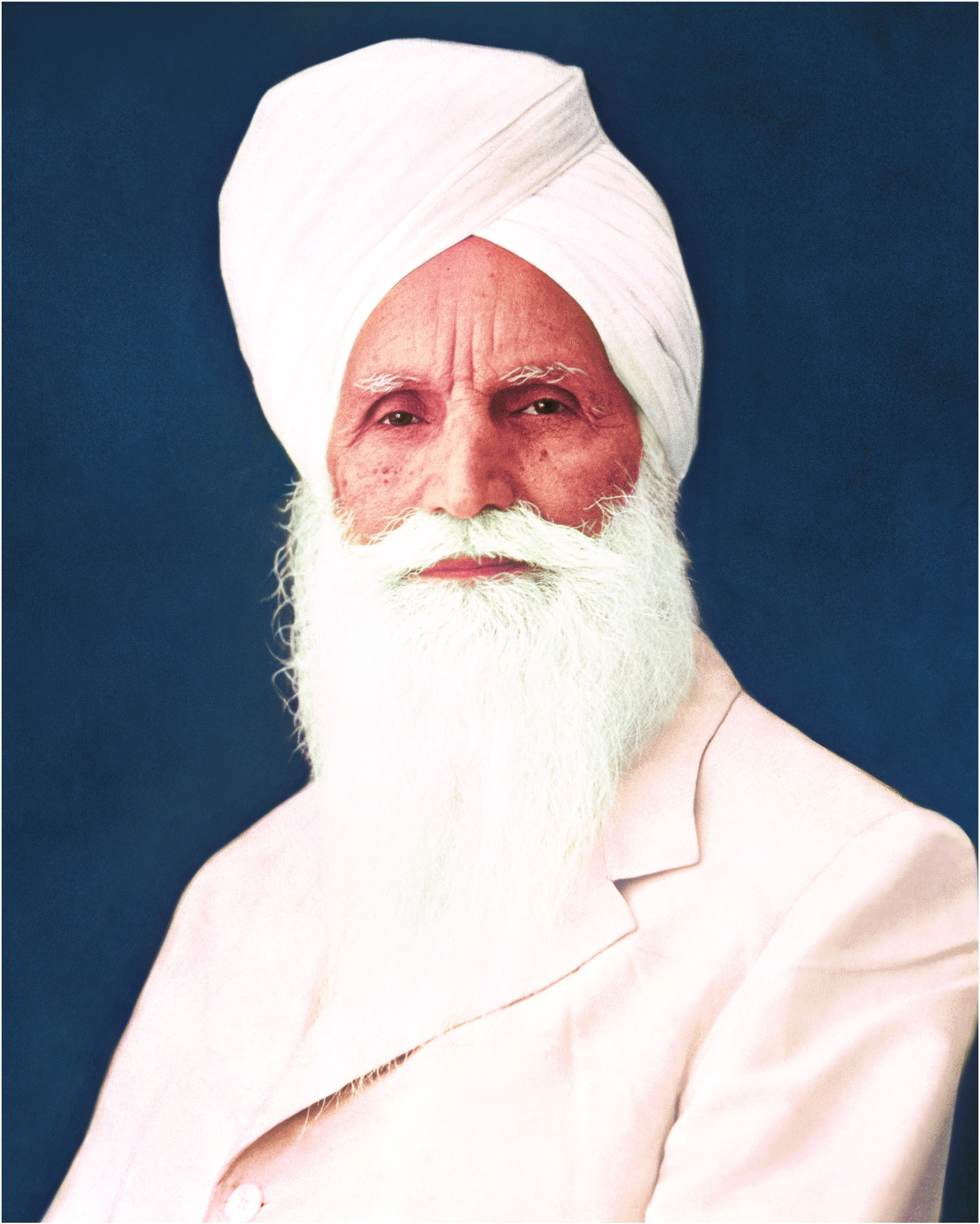
Sawan Singh, the second Master of RSSB (1903–1948).

- Sawan Singh (1858–1948), known to his followers as the "Great Master," succeeded Jaimal Singh in 1903. During his 45-year leadership, his background as an engineer influenced the planned development of the Dera, and his spiritual authority helped the movement grow into a prominent international organisation.

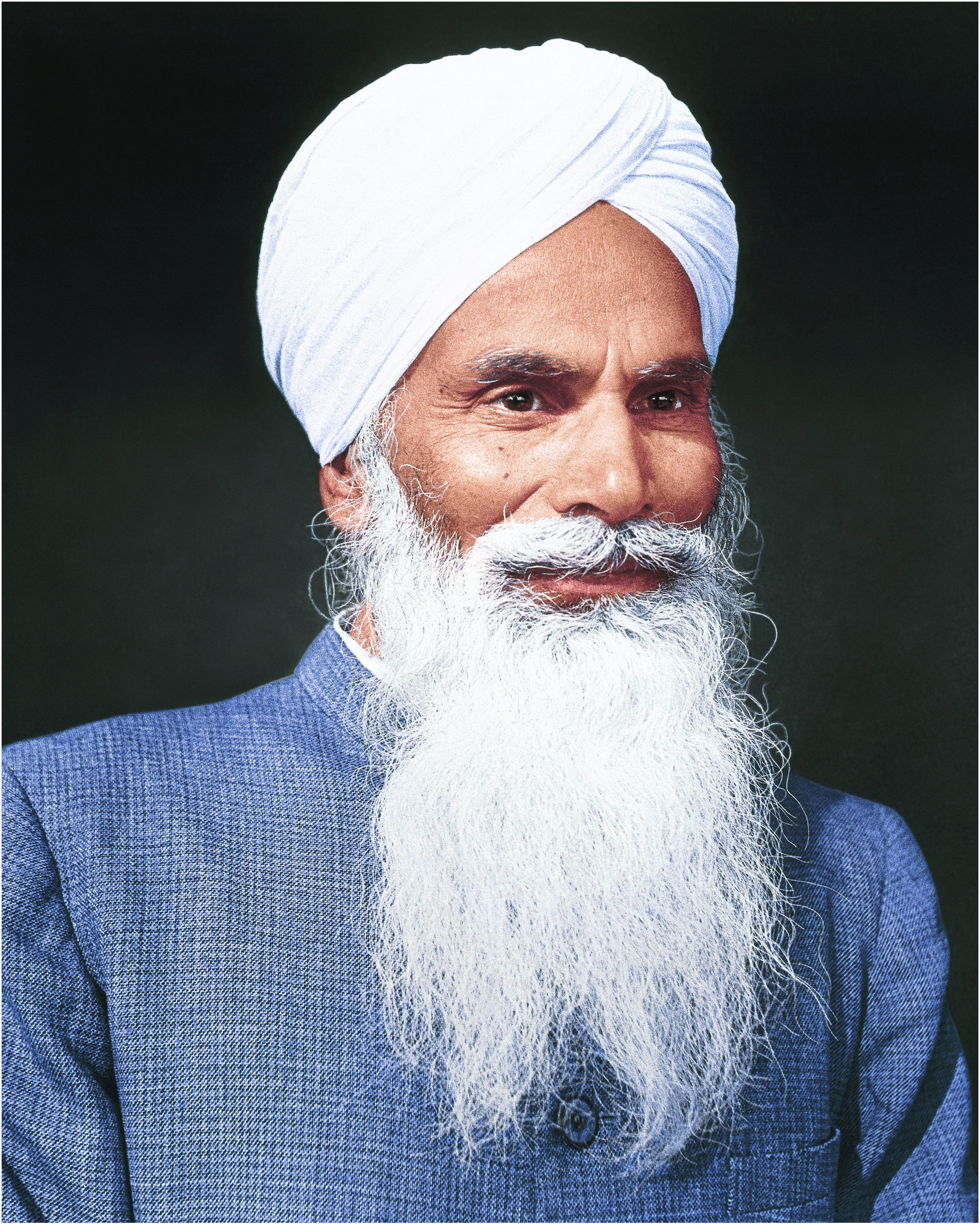
Jagat Singh, the third Master of RSSB (1948–1951).

- Jagat Singh (1884–1951), a respected academic, served as the third Master. His brief, three-year tenure from 1948 was a transitional period during which he guided the community through the challenges following the Partition of India.

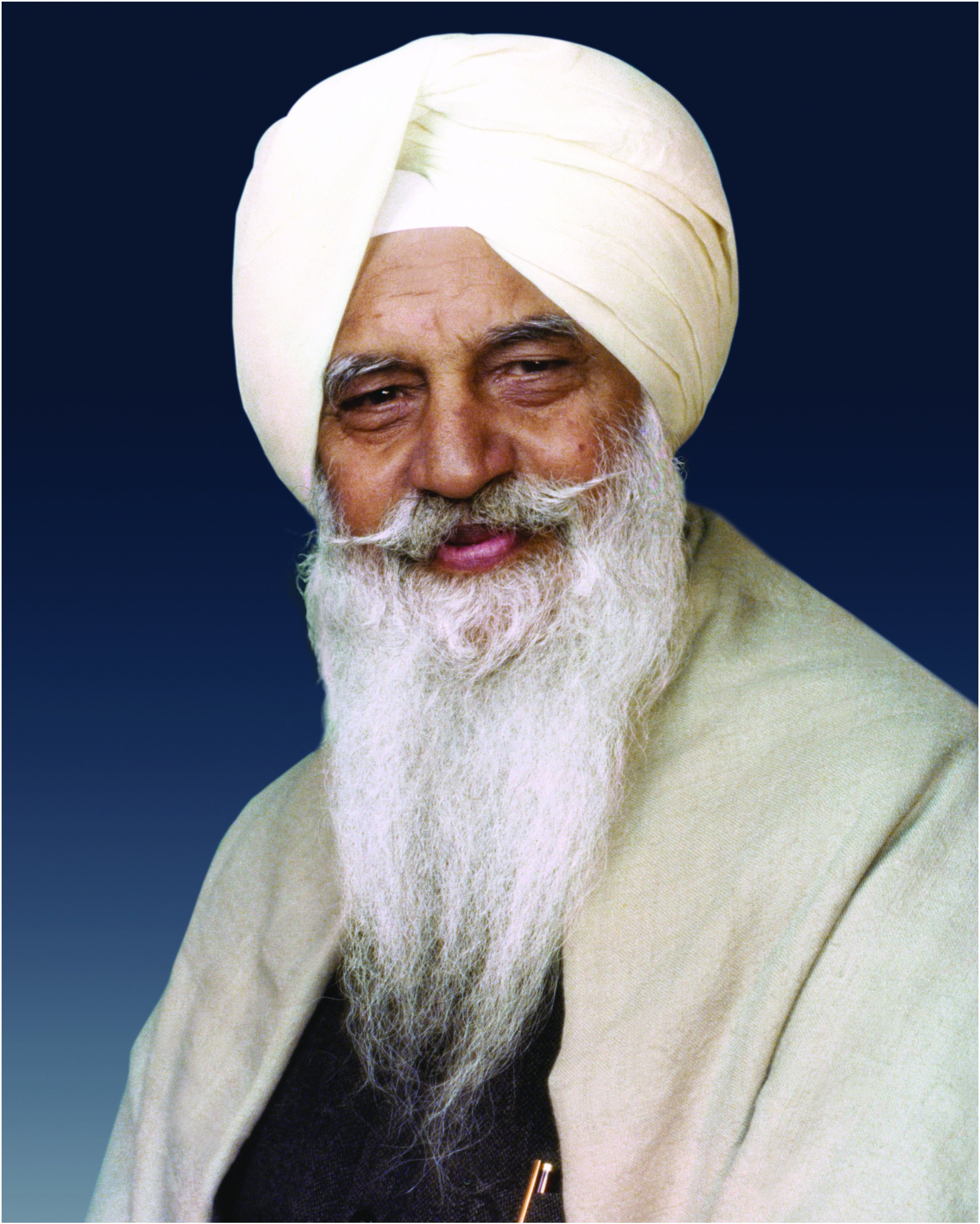
Maharaj Charan Singh, the fourth Master of RSSB (1951–1990).

- Charan Singh (1916–1990), grandson of Sawan Singh, led the organisation for 39 years from 1951. A lawyer by training, he oversaw a period of significant modernisation. His key contributions include formally registering RSSB as a non-profit society in 1957, spearheading its global expansion, and actively promoting social equality within the Dera.

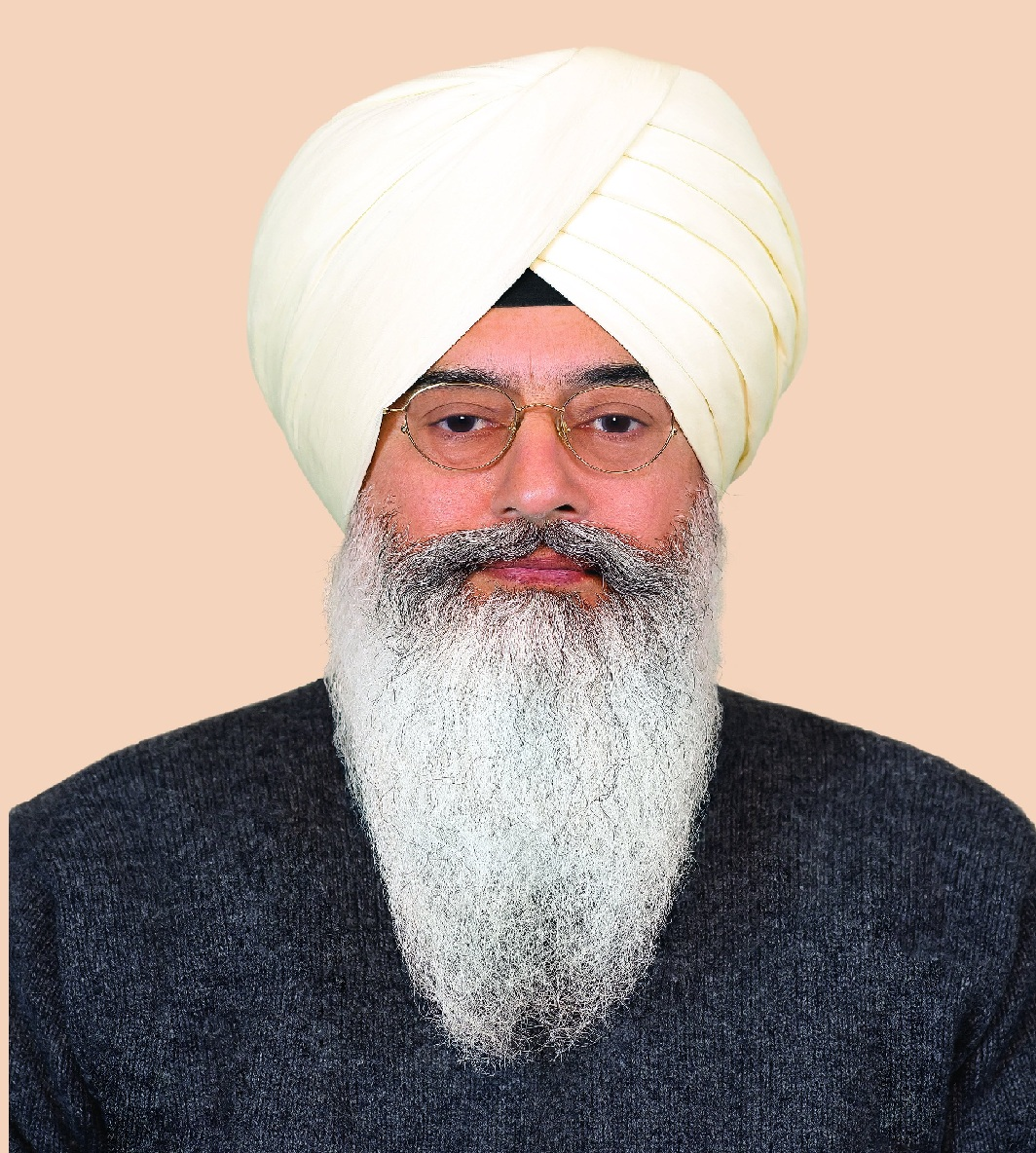
Baba Gurinder Singh, the current spiritual head of RSSB (1990–present).

- Gurinder Singh (b. 1954) has been the spiritual head since his appointment in 1990. His tenure has been characterised by the continued growth of the following and a major expansion of the Dera's infrastructure to accommodate vast international congregations.

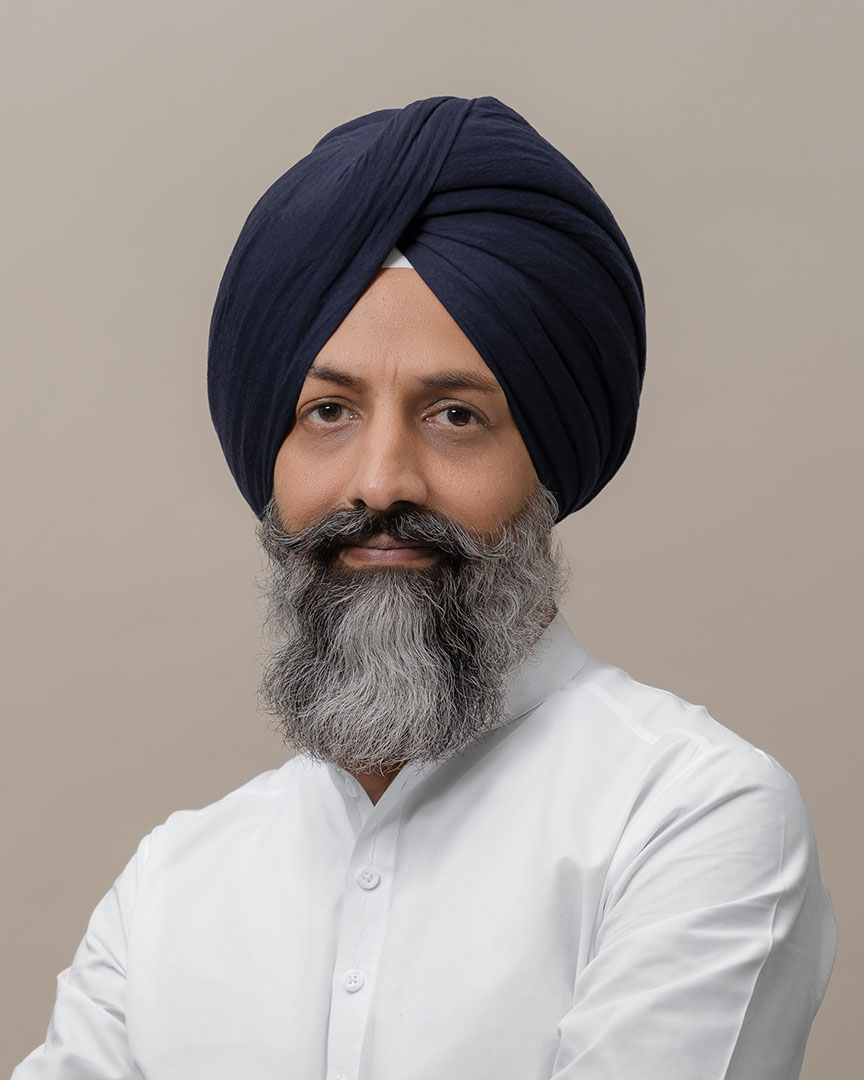
Jasdeep Singh Gill, the Satguru Designate of RSSB.

- Jasdeep Singh Gill (b. 1979) was appointed Satguru Designate in September 2024. This marked a departure from the tradition of a successor named by the Master just before his death, establishing a plan for future spiritual leadership. Gill, who holds a PhD in chemical engineering, now shares the responsibility of granting initiation.

== Practices ==
The spiritual discipline of Radha Soami Satsang Beas is an internal practice integrated into daily life. Followers are not expected to become ascetics; instead, they are encouraged to fulfil their worldly responsibilities to family and society while dedicating time to their spiritual development. The practices are taught formally at the time of initiation.

=== Surat Shabd Yoga Meditation ===
The central practice is a meditation method called Surat Shabd Yoga. Described as a "science of the soul," its purpose is to invert the attention from the outer world to the inner spiritual realms by connecting the soul (surat) with the divine Sound Current (Shabd). The meditation is a solitary practice performed for two and a half hours each day, typically in the early morning. It consists of a threefold process:

- Simran (Repetition): The silent repetition of five sacred names given by the Master at initiation. The purpose is to still the mind and withdraw one's attention to the tisra til, or third eye—the point between and behind the eyebrows considered the seat of the soul.
- Dhyan (Contemplation): The practice of focusing on the form of the Master within. This is intended to cultivate devotion and hold the attention at the third eye centre.
- Bhajan (Listening): The final and primary stage, where the practitioner listens for the inner sound of the Shabd. This divine melody is believed to pull the soul upward through higher spiritual planes.

The method requires no difficult physical postures and can be practised by anyone regardless of age or physical ability.

=== Ethical lifestyle and community support ===
The meditation practice is supported by a disciplined and ethical way of life, which followers commit to at initiation. This lifestyle is considered essential for making spiritual progress and includes four main principles:

1. A lacto-vegetarian diet, excluding all meat, fish, fowl, and eggs.
2. Abstinence from alcohol, tobacco, and recreational drugs.
3. A moral and ethical life, including earning an honest livelihood.
4. A commitment to daily meditation.

Individual practice is further supported by community gatherings. Attending satsang (spiritual discourses) is a cornerstone of the path, serving to reinforce the teachings and create a collective spiritual atmosphere. In addition, followers are encouraged to perform seva (selfless service) at the organisation's centres and in their communities. Seva is seen as a practical means of cultivating humility, devotion, and love for others.

== The dera at Beas ==
The international headquarters of Radha Soami Satsang Beas, known as Dera Baba Jaimal Singh, is located on the banks of the Beas River in Punjab. It functions as both the spiritual centre of the organisation and a sprawling, self-sufficient township. While a place of pilgrimage, it has been described as more of a "spiritual city" than a traditional ashram, notable for its high degree of organisation and its reliance on volunteer service.

It is not only a spiritual centre for the organisation but also a self-sufficient township that operates on a massive scale, especially during designated weekends when the Master is present. People from all over the world then come over to attend satsang, receive initiation and perform seva.

=== Scale and infrastructure ===
The Dera spans approximately 1,900 acres of developed land, with an additional 1,250 acres under cultivation for its food needs. It has a permanent population of around 7,000 residents, consisting mainly of full-time volunteers (sevadars) and their families. During scheduled spiritual gatherings, this population can swell dramatically to accommodate between 200,000 and 500,000 visitors from around the world.

The colony's infrastructure is designed to manage these vast congregations and includes:

- The Satsang Hall: The focal point of the Dera is a massive open-sided shed used for discourses. With a covered area capable of seating approximately 500,000 people, it is one of the largest structures of its kind and is equipped with a modern sound system and large video screens.
- The Langar (Community Kitchen): A vast community kitchen provides free vegetarian meals to all residents and visitors. It is a large-scale, modern operation capable of feeding tens of thousands of people at a time, embodying the principles of equality and community service.
- Accommodation: A comprehensive system of free housing is available for visitors, ranging from large communal sheds to dormitories (sarais) and multi-story hostel complexes with private rooms, all managed by a computerised booking system.

=== Self-sufficiency and volunteer service ===
The Dera is largely self-sufficient, operating its own farms, workshops for manufacturing building materials, a water supply, and waste management systems. The entire operation—from construction and farming to sanitation and food service—is run by volunteers. This practice of selfless service, or seva, is a fundamental aspect of the spiritual path. It is performed by both residents and visiting followers, who contribute their labour as a form of devotion. The organisation is funded entirely through donations, and any necessities sold within the Dera are offered at subsidised, non-profit rates.

== Charitable activities ==
Radha Soami Satsang Beas engages in extensive social welfare programs, which are funded entirely by voluntary donations and run by volunteers (sevadars) as a form of selfless community service (seva). The organisation's charitable work is centred on healthcare, disaster relief, and community support.

=== Healthcare services ===
Through its affiliated societies, RSSB operates several charitable hospitals that provide free medical care to the public, particularly in underserved rural areas. All services are offered without regard to a patient's religion, caste, or economic status. Key facilities include the Maharaj Sawan Singh Charitable Hospital in Beas, a 260-bed multi-specialty hospital, and other hospitals in Haryana and Himachal Pradesh. The organisation also conducts free medical and dental camps in various locations to provide healthcare access to remote populations.

=== Disaster relief ===
RSSB has a long history of providing humanitarian aid during natural disasters. Volunteers are mobilised to supply essential aid, including food, water, shelter, and medical care, to affected communities. The organisation has been active in relief efforts following major earthquakes in Gujarat, Kashmir, and Nepal, as well as various floods, often focusing on long-term rehabilitation by constructing shelters and schools.

==== COVID-19 pandemic response ====
During the COVID-19 pandemic in India, RSSB played a significant role in supporting national and state relief efforts. The organisation offered its numerous centres across the country to be used as quarantine facilities and temporary COVID care centres. Notably, its center in South Delhi was converted into the 10,000-bed Sardar Patel COVID Care Centre, one of the largest such facilities in the world. Throughout the crisis, its volunteers prepared and distributed millions of free meals daily to migrant workers and other vulnerable populations affected by the lockdowns.

=== Community and educational services ===
- Langar (Free Community Kitchen): The langar at the Dera is a major, year-round charitable activity, providing free meals to hundreds of thousands of people and exemplifying the teachings of equality and service.
- Education: Under the RSSB Educational & Environmental Society, the organisation runs the Pathseekers School at the Dera. The school is affiliated with the CBSE and provides modern education primarily for the children of Dera residents and employees of the affiliated hospitals.
- Community awareness: The organisation regularly conducts blood donation camps and programs to raise awareness for organ donation among its members and the wider community.

== Publications and media ==
Radha Soami Satsang Beas produces a wide range of publications and multimedia content to disseminate its teachings globally. All materials are distributed on a non-profit basis and sold at cost to ensure they are widely accessible. The formal Publications Department was established in the mid-1970s under Charan Singh, which led to a significant expansion in the translation and distribution of spiritual literature.

The organisation's literature forms a comprehensive body of work on the Sant Mat philosophy. The core of its literary output consists of books authored by the spiritual Masters of the Beas lineage, collections of their discourses (satsangs), and transcripts of their question-and-answer sessions. These published discourses are central to the tradition, as they preserve and circulate the Master's interpretation of the path's core tenets. The publications also include translations of classic Sant Mat texts and introductory books for new seekers. This material is available in print and as e-books in over 35 languages and is sold at satsang centers and through the official online bookstore, Science of the Soul.

In addition to written texts, RSSB utilises audio and video media to convey the teachings. This includes recordings of discourses, question-and-answer sessions, and devotional hymns (shabads). Many print books are also produced as audiobooks, making the teachings accessible to a broader audience. The organisation also publishes a free periodical, Spiritual Link, containing excerpts from the teachings.

== Global presence and demographics ==
From its origins in Punjab, Radha Soami Satsang Beas has grown into a global organisation with an international following. The organisation has a presence in more than 90 countries, managed through a network of thousands of local satsang centres that serve as spiritual hubs for their communities.

The international structure is centrally guided from the Dera in Beas but administered locally. In countries with a large following, formal boards of management are established, and the Master appoints authorised representatives to conduct initiations on his behalf. This has allowed for the establishment of major centers that host regional gatherings across the world, including in the United States (Petaluma, California, and Fayetteville, North Carolina), the United Kingdom (Haynes Park), Australia, South Africa, and Canada, alongside a strong presence throughout Europe, Africa, the Asia-Pacific region, and Latin America.

The following of RSSB is diverse, a characteristic attributed to its non-sectarian and universal teachings. The philosophy is presented as a spiritual science compatible with any religion, and followers are not required to abandon their own cultural or religious identities. Consequently, the membership includes people from virtually all major world religions, nationalities, and socioeconomic backgrounds. Followers come from various walks of life, including farmers, artists, scientists, and business professionals, reflecting the universal accessibility of the path.

== Influence in politics ==
The organisation has traditionally maintained distance from politics and media. In the last decade, the current spiritual head has had several meetings with political figures from across party lines creating a question about the organisation's apolitical stance. In 2020, RSSB's Delhi centre was turned into a COVID-19 care centre. Kejriwal from the Aam Aadmi Party and Amit Shah from the Bhartiya Janta Party visited the Delhi centre. Amit Shah met the RSSB head again in 2022. In 2022, Narendra Modi spent an hour in Beas.

Ahead of the Punjab elections, in February 2026 the Beas head organised a public anti-drugs walk with leaders from Bharatiya Janata Party (BJP) and the Shiromani Akali Dal (SAD). Historically Dera Beas has maintained a neutral stand in politics. However, this walk did raise a political storm. Chief minister of Haryana Nayab Saini also met the Guru ahead of the polls.

In 2026 Dhillon visited Bikram Singh Majithia in jail. Majithia of SAD was arrested due to a corruption charge related to a disproportionate assets (DA) case. He had been arrested earlier too in connection with a 2021 Narcotic Drugs and Psychotropic Substances (NDPS) Act case. Bikram Singh Majithia's wife Ganieve Kaur is a distant relative of the dera head. Dhillon in an interview to the press said that all allegations on Majitha's are false.

== See also ==
- Julian Johnson
- Contemporary Sant Mat movements
- Gurus of Shabdism
