= Army Public School, Dagshai =

Location
- Dagshai Hills, Solan, Himachal Pradesh; India; 30.886°N 77.049°E

Information
- Type: Army boarding school
- Motto: Dedication to the Nation
- Established: 1 June 1986
- School district: Solan
- Staff: 50
- Grades: Juniors, Middles, Seniors
- Enrollment: 600
- Campus type: Residential
- Colour: Blue
- Affiliation: All India CBSE
- Founder: General K. Sunderji and General R. S. Dayal
- Houses: Nehru, Patel, Tagore, Subhash, Indira
- Headmaster: Sanjay Mishra
- Website: apsdagshai.org

Army Public School is a boarding school located in Dagshai, India. It lies on top of the Dagshai Hills. General K Sunderji and General R S Dayal established the school in 1986 under HQ Western Command. It is a co-educational residential School affiliated to the CBSE, New Delhi, and is a member of the Indian Public Schools' Conference.

The name Dagshai, according to a popular local legend was derived from Daag-e-Shahi. During the Moghul times a Daag-e-Shahi (royal mark) was put on the forehead of the criminals and sent packing to the then Dagshai village. This can also be seen on a rock edict in the school premises. The closest railway station is Kumarhatti located some two kilometers from Dagshai. Trains from and to Kalka operate on this track between Kalka and Shimla.

== History ==
The first batch of school had 78 boys and 11 girls. New students are admitted from classes 5th-12th grade on the basis of a written examination held all over India in Army schools. The school prepares the students of Class X for All India Secondary School Examination and those of Class-XII for the All India Senior Secondary School Examination. The principal of the School is Mrs Ritambra Ghai.

The school has constantly figured in the lists of best residential schools in India, owing to its discipline, low cost of education and the dedication of its students and teachers to be the best in educational as well as sports fields. The school is currently ranked 9th in the list of best boarding schools for its quality of education amongst others.

The current and old students of this school are called dapsians.

== Present day ==
The Army Public School, Dagshai, occupies an estate covering 40 acres of the Dagshai hills, at an altitude of 2100 metres above sea level. It is a member of the Indian Public Schools Conference (IPSC) and is involved in competitions organised by it such as sports and educational.

The school honors its original purpose by continuing to offer a reduction in fees for the children of military families. About seventy percent of the boarders are the sons and daughters of military personnel and its pupils. Its annual Founder's Day i.e. 1 June is celebrated with much fanfare amongst its students as well an old dapsians. A significant number of school-leavers continue to join the armed forces but there has been a decline in this tradition recently with a lot of students going for the civil way of life rather than the armed one.

Dapsians are divided into five houses called Tagore, Nehru, Patel, Subhash and Indira, named after Indian freedom fighters or prominent Indians. Indira house is for girls while Subhash house is for younger boys of 5th and 6th standard. The other three houses have students from 7th to 12th standard who compete with each other at activities such as Sports, cross country running, athletics and debating.

Trophies and other accolades won by the students are given to them on founders day on 1 June each year. The founders day is a big affair in the school calendar as it is attended by some high ranking Indian Army officials as well as its alumni and students.

Together with some other leading Indian schools, including the Delhi Public SChool, R.K. PURAM, Mayo College, Daly College, the Rashtriya Indian Military College Dehradun, The Doon School Dehradun and many others, Army Public School, Dagshai is a member of the Indian Public School Conference, an association of some seventy seven schools, including Sainik Schools and Military Schools.

== Alumni ==
- Jasdeep Singh Gill
- Kulraj Randhawa
- Rannvijay Singha
- Vidyut Jamwal
- Major Udai Singh
- Colonel Rahul Sareen
- Colonel Ravinder Cheema
- Colonel Jiten KK
- Brig Rahul Machhral, SM
- Col VJS NAT
- Col KV Singh
- COL Ajay Singh yadav Rigzen Dolker
- Diwakar Pundir
- Anuj Tandon
- Karan Bajaj
- Adv. Mohit Kundu
