= Jaimal Singh =

First Satguru of Radha Soami Satsang Beas

Personal life
- Born: July 1839 Ghuman, Amritsar district, Punjab, Sikh Empire
- Died: 29 December 1903 (age 64) Punjab Province, British India
- Other name: Baba Ji Maharaj (honorific used by devotees)
- Occupation: Army [Sikh Regiment No. 24 (up to 33 years)] and later Spiritual Leader of Radha Soami Satsang Beas sect
- Website: Official Website

Religious life
- Religion: Radha Soami

Senior posting
- Based in: pre-partition Punjab
- Post: Sant
- Period in office: 1889–1903
- Successor: Sawan Singh

Jaimal Singh (1839–1903) was an Indian spiritual leader. He became an initiate of Shiv Dayal Singh (Radha Soami). After his initiation, Jaimal Singh served in the British Indian Army as a sepoy (private) from the age of seventeen and attained the rank of havildar (sergeant). After retirement, he settled in a desolate and isolated spot outside the town of Beas (in undivided Punjab, now East Punjab) and began to spread the teaching of his guru Shiv Dayal Singh. The place grew into a colony which came to be called the "Dera Baba Jaimal Singh" ("the camp of Baba Jaimal Singh"), and which is now the world centre of the Radha Soami Satsang Beas organisation.

Singh was the first spiritual master and head of Radha Soami Satsang Beas until his death in 1903. Before his death he appointed Sawan Singh as his spiritual successor.

== Youth and education ==
Singh was born in July 1839 in the village of Ghuman, near Batala in Gurdaspur district, Punjab, Sikh Empire. His parents were Jodh Singh, a farmer, and Daya Kaur. His mother Daya Kaur was a devotee of the North Indian Sant Namdev, and at the age of four Singh started visiting the Ghuman shrine of Namdev.

At the age of five, Singh started his education with Khem Dass, a Vedantic sage. Within two years, Singh had become a good reader of the Guru Granth Sahib and also read the Dasam Granth.

At the age of 12, he came to understand that the Guru Granth Sāhib rejected pranayama (energy culture), hatha yoga (psycho-physiological development), tirtha yatra (pilgrimage), fasting, and rituals as means to finding the One God described by Guru Nanak. Singh came to the conclusion that he needed to find a master who taught the practice of the Anhad Shabad (Inner Sound).

He especially wanted a master who could explain the Guru Granth Sahib's reference to the Panch Shabd (Five Sounds). One such phrase is from Guru Nanak:

ghar meh ghar daykhā-ay day-ay so satgur purakh sujān.
pañch sabad dhunikār dhun tah bājai sabad nīsān.

The True Guru, the All-knowing, Primal Being shows us our true home within the home of the self.
The Five Primal Sounds resonate and resound within; the Primal Sound is revealed there, vibrating gloriously.

== Search and discipleship ==
Between the ages of 15 and 17, Singh undertook an arduous journey through North India on a lengthy quest for a teacher, having decided at age 14 that he needed to find a Master of the Panch Shabd (Five Sounds). In 1856, his travels culminated in Agra city at the feet of his master Shiv Dayal Singh who initiated him into the practice of the Five Sounds, named Surat Shabd Yoga.
