= Charan Singh (spiritual leader) =

Fourth Satguru of Radha Soami Satsang Beas

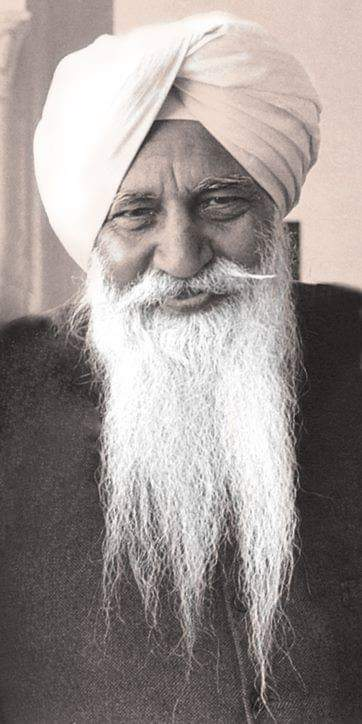

Fourth Satguru of Radha Soami Satsang Beas

Personal life
- Born: 12 December 1916 Moga district, Punjab
- Died: 1 June 1990 (aged 73) Beas, Punjab, India
- Spouse: Harjeet Kaur
- Education: Randhir College Kapurthala (F.A.); Gordon College Rawalpindi (B.A.); Punjab University Lahore (L.L.B.)
- Other name: Hazur Maharaj Ji
- Occupation: Lawyer (approx up to 5 years) and later spiritual leader of Radha Soami Satsang Beas sect

Religious life
- Religion: Sant Mat, Radha Soami

Senior posting
- Based in: Beas, Punjab, India
- Period in office: 1951–1990
- Predecessor: Jagat Singh
- Successor: Gurinder Singh
- Website: https://www.rssb.org/

Charan Singh (12 December 1916 – 1 June 1990), was the spiritual head of Radha Soami Satsang Beas, Dera Baba Jaimal Singh, after he was named successor by the preceding Beas guru Jagat Singh, in 1951. Charan Singh served as the guru for the Beas Dera for almost four decades, until his death from heart failure in 1990 at the age of 73. Before his appointment in 1951, he had practiced law in Hisar and Sirsa, India. He was an initiate of Sawan Singh's, who was his paternal grandfather and the predecessor of Jagat Singh. Charan Singh assigned the duties of his successor and Guru to his initiate and nephew Gurinder Singh.

== Early life and education ==
Singh was born in 1916 in his mother’s home in Moga, Punjab. His birth name was Harcharan Singh but was later changed to the Charan Singh. His father, Harbans Singh Grewal, was the youngest son of Sawan Singh, who was affectionately known as the Great Master. His mother's name was Mata Sham Kaur.

At the age of 22, Singh completed his B.A. degree from Gordon College, Rawalpindi, and went on to study law at Punjab University, Lahore. After receiving his LL.B. degree in 1942, he started to build his own practice as a lawyer in the town of Sirsa, near the family home. In 1944 Sawan Singh arranged his marriage to Harjeet Kaur, the daughter of Rao Bahadur Shiv Dhyan Singh.

== Spiritual path ==
By the time Singh was appointed as the satguru, the dera had grown, and many satsang centres had been established throughout India. His practical understanding of administrative matters allowed him to make changes to the administrative structure that would carry the organization smoothly into a fast-changing, modern world. In 1957, Singh placed all Dera assets into a Charitable Trust, the Radha Soami Satsang Beas Society. Singh himself helped frame the constitution and rules and regulations for the Society. His leadership in this matter created an administrative framework under which the Dera and its activities continue to be administered.

As the spiritual head of Radha Soami Satsang Beas, Charan Singh was noted for his succinct and clear explanations of the Sant Mat teachings, a reflection of his legal training and practice. He had many disciples from foreign countries as well as India, and would often give discourses and hold question-and-answer sessions with them, both at the Beas International guest house, as well as on his frequent overseas tours. Many of these sessions were published in books and as audio recordings, and offer a comprehensive understanding of the path of Sant Mat. Under his guidance, books on Sant Mat were published in almost every Indian language, as well as the main languages spoken globally such as French, Spanish, Dutch, German, Greek, Italian, Indonesian, and many others.

Most of the activities of the Society take place in the form of seva – voluntary service to the Lord through service to humanity – which is a key foundation of the teachings of the Beas masters. Charan Singh initiated the launching of a Medical Eye Camp, a network of charitable hospitals, disaster management projects, and free food distribution programmes, which have continued as his legacy.

== Vegetarianism ==
Singh insisted on a strict lacto-vegetarian diet for ethical reasons. The act of killing is considered to produce bad karma from those who slaughter the animal and those who buy and consume the products. Initiates are not allowed to eat eggs or "even an occasional plate of soup containing eggs, fish, fowl or meat or meat broth". In response to unfertilized eggs, Singh commented that the egg fertilized or not, is essentially a foetus and not compatible with a vegetarian diet. He warned that wavering from vegetarianism even minutely will lead to "misuse and thus defeat the purpose".

== Death and successor ==
On 1 June 1990, Singh died at Dera, Beas. He entrusted his authority and responsibility as patron of the Radha Soami Satsang Beas Society and the Maharaj Jagat Singh Medical Relief Society Beas to Gurinder Singh who, at 36 years of age, has taken on the same responsibilities that had been assumed by Charan Singh forty years earlier.

== Selected publications ==
- Spiritual Discourses (1974)
- Quest For Light (1977)
- Divine Light (1983)
- Light on Sant Mat (1985)
- Spiritual Heritage: A Transcription from Tape Recorded Talks of Maharaj Charan Singh (1985)
- Die to Live (1988)
