= Bhattiwal =

- Village
- Interactive map of Bhattiwal
- Coordinates: 31°42′22.84″N 75°23′44.50″E
- Country: India
- State: Punjab
- District: Gurdaspur
- Tehsil: Batala
- Region: Majha

Government
  - Type: Panchayat raj
  - Body: Gram panchayat

Languages
  - Official: Punjabi
- Time zone: UTC+5:30 (IST)
- Telephone: 01871
- ISO 3166 code: IN-PB
- Vehicle registration: PB-18
- Website: gurdaspur.nic.in

Bhattiwal is a village in Batala in Gurdaspur district of Punjab State, India. The village is administrated by Sarpanch an elected representative of the village.

In Bhattiwal the surname Randev (from the Jatt cast) is very common.

There are important gurdwaras of Bhagat Namdev ji

== See also ==
- List of villages in India
