= Kirpal Singh =

Indian guru (1894–1974)

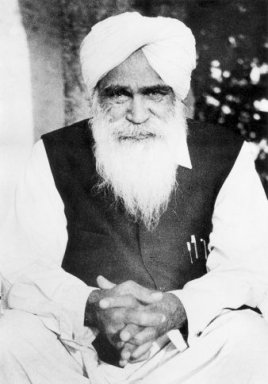
- Kirpal Singh in 1972
- Title: Sant

Personal life
- Born: 6 February 1894 Syed Kasran, Punjab, British Raj
- Died: 21 August 1974 (aged 80) New Delhi, Delhi, India
- Citizenship: British India, Republic of India
- Notable works: Man! Know Thyself; The Crown of Life
- Known for: Extensive reading of world scriptures; Founder, Ruhani Satsang; President, World Fellowship of Religions; Founder, Human Unity Conference
- Other name: Kirpal Singh Duggal
- Occupation: Accountant, Military Accounts Department

Religious life
- Religion: Sikhism
- Philosophy: Nirgun Bhakti
- Lineage: Uttarī Bhārat kī Sant Paramparā
- Initiation: Surat Shabd Yoga, Sant Mat; 1924; Dera Baba Jaimal Singh, Beās, Pañjāb, Indian Empire by Baba Sawan Singh

Religious career
- Based in: Delhi
- Predecessor: Baba Sawan Singh

Kirpal Singh (6 February 1894 – 21 August 1974) was a spiritual master (satguru) in the tradition of Radha Soami.

Kirpal Singh was born in Sayyad Kasran, Punjab, in what is now Pakistan. He lived in Lahore during the period of his discipleship and attained a high position in the bureaucracy as a deputy comptroller of military accounts.

He was the President of the World Fellowship of Religions, an organization recognized by UNESCO, which had representatives from all the main religions of the world. Beginning with the publication of Gurmat Sidhant, authored by him in the late 1930s and published under his Guru's name, during the period of his ministry he published many books and circulars that were translated into numerous languages.

The teaching of the Surat Shabd Yoga is a path of personal spiritual attainment under the guidance of a living spiritual master. The basic teachings consist in opening the inner eye or third eye to develop vision of inner light and inner sound. This is considered to be the power of the unmanifested Godhead coming into expression and is called Word in the Bible, and Naam, Shabd, Om, Kalma, and other names in the other scriptures. Kirpal Singh taught that the practice of meditation on the Divine Word, or the Yoga of the Sound Current (Surat Shabd Yoga) was at the spiritual base of all religions.

== Life ==
From youth, Kirpal Singh had visionary experience and foreknowledge of events. He sought guidance from various sufis, yogis and mystics, but never accepted any of them as a master, and continued his spiritual practice and prayers for the guidance of a living teacher. In 1917, he began to see a spiritual form that he believed was Guru Nanak, founder of the Sikh religion, or Sikhism. In 1924, he met Hazur Maharaj Sawan Singh Ji, the famous Saint of the Beas, in his Ashram on the banks of the Beas River, and in him recognized the luminous form he had seen during the seven previous years. Hazur initiated him into Surat Shabd Yoga, and from then on Kirpal Singh dedicated his life to the mission of his spiritual Master and to his practices, while married, with children and in a responsible government position. Baba Sawan Singh Ji Maharaj asked him to meditate six hours daily, a practice which he maintained throughout his discipleship, despite his life responsibilities.

From early the 1930s on, when Hazur was asked if he had a disciple who had made great progress, he cited Kirpal Singh. In the same years, on inspiration from his master, Kirpal began writing the "Gurmat Siddhant" ("The Philosophy of the Masters"), a two-volume spiritual work, in the Punjabi and Urdu languages. It was published, on Kirpal request, under the name of Hazur Maharaj Sawan Singh Ji. In the 1960s, it was published in English in five volumes. Ruhani Satsang published a number of books under Kirpal Singh's name that were essentially portions of Gurmat Sidhant.

On the morning of 12 October 1947, Hazur Maharaj Sawan Singh Ji entrusted his disciple Kirpal Singh with the work of continuing his spiritual mission. The next month, Hazur approved the project of the "Ruhani Satsang" (School of Spirituality or Science of the Soul) Kirpal presented to him. Hazur Maharaj Sawan Singh Ji died on 2 April 1948, following a brief illness.

After his master's passing, Kirpal went to Rishikesh at the foot of the Himalayan Mountains, where he spent the next five months in an almost continual state of samadhi, or absorption in God.

At the end of this period of intense meditation, Kirpal Singh received an inner command from his master: "Return to the world and bring my children back to me." He moved to Delhi, where people from Punjab were looking for refuge because of the division from Pakistan, and there began his spiritual and humanitarian mission.

Kirpal initiated over 80,000 followers

== Ruhani Satsang ==
In Delhi, Kirpal Singh founded his new school of spiritual research and realization, called Ruhani Satsang (School of Spirituality or Science of the Soul), which would go on to have branches in many nations of the world. In 1951 he built the Sawan Ashram, in the neighborhood of Shakti Nagar on the outskirts of the city, where his spiritual talks (satsangs) were soon followed by thousands of people.

He began to have visits from western disciples. The first was Rusel Jacque, whose account of his six months at the ashram in 1959 (Gurudev: the Lord of Compassion) encouraged others to make the journey. At the beginning of the sixties, an average 40 to 50 disciples stayed at the ashram from three weeks to six months.

== Vegetarianism ==
The vegetarian Sattvic diet was an important part of Singh's teachings. He recommended a simple lacto-vegetarian diet consisting of fruit, grains, nuts and vegetables with permitted dairy products for spiritual reasons. Meat, eggs and spices were strictly avoided as they were considered Rajsic and Tamsic foods. He argued against overfeeding.

== World Fellowship of Religions ==
In 1957, Singh was elected the first president of the World Fellowship of Religions, an organization recognized by UNESCO, comprising representatives from all the major world religions. He held that position until 1971, and presided over four World Conferences.

In 1962, he became the first non-Christian to receive the Order of Saint John of Jerusalem (Knights of Malta) for his spiritual and humanitarian work. On this occasion he received the congratulations of India's prime minister, Jawaharlal Nehru, and established a spiritual tie with him that continued with prime ministers Lal Bahadur Shastri and Indira Gandhi.

== World tour ==
=== First tour ===
Singh's mission continued to grow rapidly. In 1955, he made his first trip abroad to spread his teachings, and spent months in the United States and Europe. It was the first time an Indian spiritual master had visited the West. In those years, Eastern spiritual practices were generally unfamiliar to the West. Singh had hundreds of Westerners initiated and placed on the path of meditation, which he claimed led to contact with the Divine Light and Harmony.

In 1963, Singh made his second world tour, this time as president of the World Fellowship of Religions. He met with political leaders and other religious leaders, including Pope Paul VI and the Patriarch of the Eastern Orthodox Churches Atenagora I. At the same time, he continued to instruct new seekers on the path of the Way of the Masters (Sant Mat).

On 26 August 1972, Kirpal Singh conducted his third and final tour of the West, where he received and instructed more than 2000 new disciples of the Path of Spirituality.

== Final year ==
In Delhi in February 1974, Singh organized the World Conference on Unity of Man. More than 2000 delegates attended, including religious and political leaders from India and around the world. Over 100,000 people attended the conference in total.

At the Kumba Mela (Festival of Religions) in Haridwar on 2 April of the same year, Singh gathered sadhus (itinerant monks) and "saintly men" in the Conference of National Unity, with the aims of promoting cooperation, eliminating religious barriers, and bettering the economic status of India's poor.

In 1974 Kirpal Singh established the Unity of Man conference, which was intended as a platform to bring together both religious and political leaders towards finding common ground and improved relations. This conference, under the name, Human Unity Conference, continues to this day.

== Legacy and succession ==
Kirpal Singh died on 21 August 1974 at the age of eighty. His death caused an intense succession dispute amongst his followers. Kirpal was not expected to appoint a successor by will given his own mode of succession.

Darshan Singh was a successor. However, Russell Perkins, leader of the Sant Bani Ashram in the United States which had been responsible for Kirpal's English publishing, did not recognize Darshan, but instead supported Ajaib Singh. Arran Stephens, a well-known Canadian convert, also joined in supporting Ajaib, although he later rejected Ajaib and left the movement. Thakar Singh also claimed succession, as did Judith Lamblion. Reno Sirrine led the Ruhani Satsang organization in rejecting all successors.

There is also Pier Franco Marcenaro, who, after his Initiation in January 1968, was his Group Leader and Representative in Milan, Italy, and is today a recognized successor by many disciples organized in an association called "The School of Spirituality".

In 1963, Kirpal Singh had declared that he knew of no one competent to be his successor. Then He stated most forcefully: "Whoever may come up in the future, I tell you most definitely that he will NOT be a member of my family!"

These succession disputes ultimately led to the proliferation of satsangs without connection to any descendant of the Singh tradition. As of 2002, there were approximately 200,000 adherents of groups related to Kirpal Singh.

== Available teachings ==
Kirpal Singh wrote an extensive collection of books on spirituality, including The Crown of Life (a comparative study of various religions and yogas); Prayer, Its Nature and Technique; Spirituality: What It Is; Godman (on finding a spiritual teacher or guru), and The Wheel of Life (on karma).

PDF versions of Kirpal Singh's books are available free online., as are MP3 recordings of many of his talks in English and Hindi / Punjabi.

Books by Kirpal Singh

- The Coming Spiritual Revolution (compiled, edited and introduced by Russell Perkins) – New Hampshire, Sant Bani
- The Crown of Life: A Study in Yoga – Delhi: Ruhani Satsang, 1961; Franklin, New Hampshire: Sant Bani; Bowling Green, Virginia: Sawan Kirpal Publications, 1980 (ISBN 978-0-942735-77-2)
- The Philosophy of the Masters. R. D. Ahluwalia, 1963.
- Godman – Delhi: Ruhani Satsang; Franklin, New Hampshire: Sant Bani; Bowling Green, Virginia: Sawan Kirpal Publications (ISBN 978-0-942735-70-3)
- A Great Saint: Baba Jaimal Singh, His Life and Teachings – Delhi: Ruhani Satsang; Franklin, New Hampshire: Sant Bani (ISBN 978-0-942735-27-7)
- Heart to Heart Talks (2 volumes) – Delhi: Mr A.R. Manocha, 1975-6 (mentions Paul Twitchell)
- His Grace Lives On – USA: Ruhani Satsang (ISBN 978-0-942735-93-2)
- The Jap Ji: The Message of Guru Nanak – Delhi: Ruhani Satsang, 1959; Franklin, New Hampshire: Sant Bani; Bowling Green, Virginia: Sawan Kirpal Publications, 1981 (ISBN 978-0-942735-85-7)
- Life and Death (combined edition of The Wheel of Life and The Mystery of Death) – Franklin, New Hampshire: Sant Bani
- The Light of Kirpal – Franklin, New Hampshire: Sant Bani (ISBN 978-0-89142-033-0)
- Man! Know Thyself – Delhi: Ruhani Satsang; Bowling Green, Virginia: Sawan Kirpal Publications, 1983; Irvine, California: Ruhani Satsang Books (ISBN 978-0-942735-06-2)
- Morning Talks – Delhi: Ruhani Satsang, 1970; Franklin, New Hampshire: Sant Bani; Bowling Green, Virginia: Sawan Kirpal Publications (ISBN 978-0-942735-16-1)
- Naam or Word – Delhi: Ruhani Satsang, 1960; Franklin, New Hampshire: Sant Bani; Bowling Green, Virginia: Sawan Kirpal Publications, 1981 (ISBN 978-0-942735-94-9)
- The Night Is a Jungle and Other Discourses – Delhi: Ruhani Satsang; Franklin, New Hampshire: Sant Bani (ISBN 978-0-942735-18-5)
- Prayer: Its Nature and Technique – Delhi: Ruhani Satsang; Franklin, New Hampshire: Sant Bani; Bowling Green, Virginia: Sawan Kirpal Publications (ISBN 978-0-942735-50-5)
- Seven Paths to Perfection
- Spiritual Elixir – Delhi: Ruhani Satsang; Franklin, New Hampshire: Sant Bani, 1967 (ISBN 978-0-942735-02-4)
- Spirituality: What It Is – Delhi: Ruhani Satsang, 1959, 1964; Franklin, New Hampshire: Sant Bani; Bowling Green, Virginia: Sawan Kirpal Publications
- The Spiritual Path
- Surat Shabd Yoga: The Yoga of the Celestial Sound Current – Irvine, California: Ruhani Satsang Books; Blaine, Washington: Ruhani Satsang, 2006 (ISBN 0-942735-95-1)
- The Teachings of Kirpal Singh (edited by Ruth Seader) – Franklin, New Hampshire: Sant Bani, 1974–6; Bowling Green, Virginia: Sawan Kirpal Publications, 1981 (ISBN 978-0-942735-33-8)
- The Way of the Saints (edited by Russell Perkins) – Franklin, New Hampshire: Sant Bani, 1976, 1989 (ISBN 978-0-89142-026-2)
- The Wheel of Life and The Mystery of Death (ISBN 978-0-942735-80-2)
