= Beas City =

Beas
- City
- Interactive map of Beas
- Location in Punjab, India Beas (India)
- Coordinates: 31.51655°N 75.28897°E
- Country: India
- State: Punjab
- District: Amritsar

Languages
  - Official: Punjabi (Gurmukhi), Hindi
  - Regional: Punjabi, Hindi
- Time zone: UTC+5:30 (IST)
- PIN: 143201
- Vehicle registration: PB 17

Beas is a riverside city in the Amritsar district of the Indian state of Punjab, 43 km from Amritsar city, the district headquarters. It has a population of 55,295: 28,921 male and 26,374 female. Beas lies on the banks of the Beas River.

Beas town is mostly located in revenue boundary of Budha Theh with parts in villages Dholo Nangal and Wazir Bhullar. Beas falls in Amritsar district. The size of the area is about 68.75 square kilometer. Budha Theh is a census town in Baba Bakala tehsil of Amritsar district.

== Geography ==
Beas is centered (approx.) at 31°31′00″N 75°17′20″E. It is located on the G.T. Road (from Kolkata to Afghanistan), in the Amritsar district in Punjab state of India. The nearest city is Kapurthala (24 km or 15 mi) to the southwest. The holy and historical city of the Amritsar (41 km or 25 mi) lies to its northwest, and Jalandhar (38 km) is situated to its southeast.

== Radha Soami Satsang Beas ==
The headquarters of Radha Soami Satsang Beas is located just north of Beas town. The town is known as Dera Baba Jaimal Singh and is located in the east. Every year, millions of Radha Soami followers travel to Beas to attend satsangs (discourses) often held at the Dera for weeks at a time.
Furthermore, there is also the Maharaj Sawan Singh Charitable Hospital, which was constructed in the 1980s by the Maharaj Jagat Singh Medical Relief Society. Since its inauguration, it has served countless patients free of cost. It is located in the center of beas town on the G.T. Road.

== Transport ==
Air

The nearest airport is Sri Guru Ram Dass Jee International Airport located in Amritsar about 57 km away. Dera beas has its own little airport too.

Rail

The town of Beas is well connected through Beas Junction railway station to the major cities of Punjab and India. The station was rated as the cleanest and public friendly one in India in 2019 by NGO INTACT.

Road

National Highway 3 which was previously numbered as NH 1, passes through Beas town connecting it to the major cities of Punjab and India.

== See also ==
- INS Beas frigate
