= Surat Shabd Yoga =

Spiritual meditation

Surat Shabd Simran is a type of spiritual meditation in the Sant Mat tradition.

Surat Shabd Yoga literally means connecting (or union of) the consciousness to the sound. It refers to the state of meditation where the devotee (usually a human being) sits in silence and concentrates on the incoming sound that reaches his ears and the brain and he is able to hear that constantly without any kind of disturbance.

== Etymology ==
Surat is "attention" or "face", that is, an outward expression of the soul; Shabd or Shabda has multiple meanings including ‘sacred song’, ‘word’, ‘voice’, ‘hymn’, ‘verse’, or ‘sound current, ‘audible life stream’, and the ‘essence of the Absolute Supreme Being’. The Absolute Supreme Being is a dynamic force of creative energy sent out into the abyss of space at the dawn of the universe's manifestation, as sound vibrations. These vibrations continue and are sent forth through the ages, framing all things that constitute and inhabit the universe. Yoga is literally ‘union’, or ‘to yoke’. Etymologically, Surat Shabd Yoga means the ‘Union of the Soul with the Essence of the Absolute Supreme Being’.

First is simran, or the repetition of Lord's holy names. It brings back our scattered attention to the tisra til - the third eye (behind our eyes), which is the headquarters of our mind and soul, in the waking state, whence it has scattered.

Second is dhyan, or contemplation on the immortal form of the Master. This helps in keeping the attention fixed at that centre.

Third is bhajan, or listening to the Anahad Shabd or celestial music that is constantly reverberating within us. With the help of this divine melody, the soul ascends to higher regions and ultimately reaches the feet of the Lord.

Surat Shabda Yoga is also known as Sehaj Yoga – the path leading to Sehaj or equipoise, The Path of Light and Sound, The Path of the Sants or 'Saints', The Journey of Soul, and The Yoga of the Sound Current.

== Basic principles ==
Surat Shabda Yoga is for the discovery of True Self (Self-Realization), True Essence (Spirit-Realization), and True Divinity (God-Realization) while living in the human physical body. This involves reuniting in stages with what is called the "Essence of the Absolute Supreme Being", also known as the "Shabd or Word". Attaining this extent of self-realization is believed to result in jivan moksha/mukti, which is liberation/release from samsara and positivity in the cycle of karma and reincarnation. Initiation by a contemporary living Satguru (Sat - true, Guru - teacher) is considered a prerequisite for successful sadhana (spiritual exercises). The sadhanas include simran (repetition, particularly silent repetition of a mantra given at initiation), dhyan (concentration, viewing, or contemplation, particularly on the Inner Master), and bhajan (listening to the inner sounds of the Shabd). The mantra is Guru Manter. These are some verbal words that one gets from living masters and chants in mind, not with the mouth. As the language varies from culture to culture, Guru Manter or Mantra may also vary from culture to culture in spirituality. On the other hand, Naam or Word of God or Kalma is unspeakable, alive and no one can write it on paper. In the new testament "Hebrews 4:12" states, "For the Word of God is living and active. Sharper than any double-edged sword, it pierces even to dividing soul and spirit, joints and marrow. It judges the thoughts and intentions of the heart." Words which we write on paper are not alive and active. According to Scripture, the Word of God has existed since the beginning of the world, prior to any man-made language.

Surat Shabd Yoga arose in India in the last several hundred years, specifically in the Sikh tradition (Nanakpanthi) founded by Guru Nanak. The practice of meditation (Shabad), which is the central core practice of Surat Shabd Yoga, is derived from the ancient Hindu practice of nāda yoga. Nada yoga is expounded in various Hindu scriptures such as the Nadabindu Upanishad, an ancient text affiliated with the several thousands-year-old Rig Veda. The practice of nāda yoga within Hinduism has been widely affiliated within many yoga traditions including bhakti or devotional yoga, kundalini and tantric yogas, laya yoga, and raja yoga. Modern Hindu teachers still emphasizing nada yoga include Swami Sivananda, Swami Rama, Rammurti Mishra (Shri Brahmananda Sarasvati), Paramahansa Yogananda (Kriya Yoga Lineage), and many others. The practice of nāda yoga is an integral part of various other traditions as well, such as being a form of the advanced thogal practice in the Tibetan Dzogchen lineage, and is mentioned by H. P. Blavatsky, founder of the Theosophical Society in her book "The Voice of the Silence". The form of Surat Shabd Yoga, practiced by followers of Sant Mat and the Sikh tradition (nanakpanthi), is most commonly related to nāda yoga. Furthermore, nāda yoga resembles and combines elements from the Hindu practices of raja yoga, laya yoga, and bhakti yoga.

== Movements and masters ==
Adherents believe Surat Shabda Yoga has been expressed through the movements of many different masters. However, a basic principle of Surat Shabd Yoga's tradition is the requirement for an outer Living Master to initiate followers onto the Path. The movements whose historical Satgurus have died and their successors do not purport themselves to be Surat Shabd Yoga Satgurus, usually are not considered currently to be Surat Shabd Yoga movements, either by their own leaders or by movements with current Living Masters.

Satguru Maharshi Mehi Paramahansa Ji Maharaj is considered the movement leader in the 20th century. He came to an isolated cave of Kuppaghat, Bhagalpur (Bihar, India) and practiced Surat-Shabda Yoga from March 1933 - November 1934. He achieved self-realization and attained ultimate salvation during his practice. He wrote books "Moksha-Darshan (Philosophy of Salvation), "Satsang-Yoga", "Shri Gita-Yoga Prakash", "Raamcharit Maanas Saar-Satik", "Maharshi-Mehi-Padaawali" and "Maharshi-Mehi-Padawaali".

The Radha Soami movement of Surat Shabda Yoga was established by Shiv Dayal Singh (1818–1878) in 1861 and named "Radhasoami Satsang" circa 1866. Soamiji Maharaj, as he was known, presided over the satsang meetings for seventeen years at Panni Gali and Soami Bagh in Agra, India, until he died on June 15, 1878. Accounts of his guru and successors vary, although he gave verbal instructions on his last day as to how his followers should be cared for. According to Radha Soami Satsang Beas, his guru was Tulsi Sahib of Hathras. According to the successors Soami Bagh and Dayal Bagh, Tulsi Sahib was a contemporary guru of the same teachings; but being a natural born Satguru, Shiv Dayal Singh himself had no guru.

After his death, six immediate successors carried on Shiv Dayal Singh’s teachings, including Huzur Maharaj Rai Salig Ram of Peepal Mandi, Agra, and Babaji Maharaj Baba Jaimal Singh of Radha Soami Satsang Beas (RSSB). More information on living masters related to Shiv Dayal Singh's lineage can be found in the Contemporary Sant Mat movements article.

Sant Kirpal Singh, a contemporary Sant Mat guru, stated that "Naam" ("Word") has been described in many traditions through the use of several different terms. In his teachings, the following expressions are interpreted as being identical to "Naam":

- "Naad", "Akash Bani", and "Sruti" in the Vedas
- "Nada" and "Udgit" in the Upanishads
- "Logos" and "Word" in the New Testament
- "Tao" by Lao Zi
- "Music of the Spheres" by Pythagoras
- "Sraosha" by Zoraster
- "Kalma" and "Kalam-i-Qadim" in the Qur'an
- "Naam", "Akhand Kirtan", and "Sacha ('True') Shabd" by Guru Granth Sahib

The more recently promulgated Quan Yin Method of meditation espoused via the spiritual teachings of Supreme Master Ching Hai has notable similarities to Surat Shabd Yoga.

Eckankar, an American movement, has many links to Surat Shabd Yoga including terminology, although its American founder Paul Twitchell disassociated himself from his former teacher Kirpal Singh.

The Movement of Spiritual Inner Awareness, also founded in America in 1971 by John-Roger and now with students in thirty-two countries, also teaches a similar form of active meditation called spiritual exercises. This movement uses the Sound Current and ancient Sanskrit tones in order to traverse and return to the higher realms of Spirit and into God.

The MasterPath is another contemporary American movement of Surat Shabda Yoga. Gary Olsen, the current Living Master of this branch, contends that several historical figures are Sat Gurus of Surat Shabda Yoga as representatives for the eternal Inner Shabda Master. A few of these Living Masters of their times include Laozi, Jesus, Pythagoras, Socrates, Kabir, the Sufi Masters, and mystic poets, Hafez and Rumi, the Ten Sikh Gurus beginning with Guru Nanak, Tulsi Sahib, and the Radhasoami/Radha Soami and offshoot Masters, including Shiv Dayal Singh, Baba Sawan Singh, Baba Faqir Chand, and Sant Kirpal Singh.

The ten Sikh Satgurus (Nanak Panthis) discuss the inner sound and inner light a lot in their scriptures. The first Sikh Satguru was Guru Nanak, but his master (guru) was Waheguru. These masters teach these two techniques. There is a master, Satpal Maharaj, that teaches four techniques that include these two of inner light and inner music. Altogether He teaches inner light (sight), inner music (hearing), primordial vibration (sense of touch), and nectar (taste and smell).

These correspond to the five senses, and this is how a student turns them inward to experience what is inside of himself. See Vishnu with his four arms and they correspond to these. One hand is holding a circle (chakra) of light, one holding a conch shell for the inner sound (hold it to the ear and a sound is heard), one holding a lotus flower to refer to nectar, and finally the fourth hand is holding a metal club (mace) for the inner vibration (if you hit something with it, it vibrates like a tuning fork). Some people refer to this inner energy as the soul.

== The Line of Succession of sikhs ==
THE LINE OF SUCCESSION FROM KABIR TO PRESENT From Kabir to present, the Masters of the Divine Science of Light and Sound appear and manifest themselves as an uninterrupted line, through which they transmitted to each successor the one knowledge and the one Power. Subsequently, we can trace an
exact "family tree" from Kabir Sahib (1398-1518) to Sri Guru Nanak Dev Ji (1469-1539) and further as shown below:

ਹੁਕਮੁ ਪਛਾਨੈ ਸੁ ਏਕੋ ਜਾਨੈ ਬੰਦਾ ਕਹੀਐ ਸੋਈ॥੩॥ (GGSG-Page No.1350-3)...Saint Kabir
Translation: One who will recognize the Command (Hukam), will know One Lord, we call him the real man.

ਸਚਾ ਸਉਦਾ ਹਰਿ ਨਾਮੁ ਹੈ ਸਚਾ ਵਾਪਾਰਾ ਰਾਮ॥ (GGSG-Page No.570)
Translation: The True merchandise(ਸਚਾ ਸਉਦਾ) is the Lord`s Naam. Trader Raam is the truth.

Above line in the book "Guru Granth Sahib Ji" verifies that during the true merchandise (ਸਚਾ ਸਉਦਾ) when Guru Nanak Dev Ji fed the hungry saints and he got the Naam from them. Whereas in books when we read the history of Guru Nanak Dev Ji, we find no information regarding true merchandise of Word or Naam of God. This line also verifies that Guru Nanak Dev Ji also interacted with living SattGuru where from he got the Naam.

ਏਕੋ ਨਾਮੁ ਹੁਕਮੁ ਹੈ ਨਾਨਕ ਸਿਤਗੁਿਰ ਦੀਆ ਬੁਝਾਇ ਜੀਉ॥੫॥ (GGSG-Page No.72) ..Guru Nanak
Translation: The One "Naam" is the Lord's Command, O Nanak, the "True Guru(teacher)" helped me to guess the lamp (light).
(Here One Naam means One Word, and Hukam also addresses the Naam of God)

ਦੇਹੀ ਅੰਦਰਿ ਨਾਮੁ ਨਿਵਾਸੀ॥ (GGSG-Page No.1026)
Translation: The Naam or Word or Kalma, abides deep within the body.

This line demonstrates that the Naam of God is something present in the body. One will get it within his own home i.e body where the spirit lives. Body is the current home of the spirit. After Guru Nanak Dev Ji below are the nine SattGurus (i.e Teachers of truth) of the Sikhs who got the success in the history and lead the community of Sikhs:
Sri Guru Angad Dev Ji (1504-1552),
Sr Guru Amar Das Ji (1479-1574),
Sri Guru Ram Das Ji (1534-1581),
Sri Guru Arjan Dev Ji (1563-1606),
Sri Guru Har Gobind Sahib Ji (1595-1644),
Sri Guru Har Rai Sahib Ji (1630-1661),
Sri Guru Har Krishan Ji (1656-1664),
Sri Guru Teg Bahadur Ji (1621-1675)
and Sri Guru Gobind Singh Ji (1667-1708).

=== Variations in movements ===
Among the exponents of Surat Shabd Yoga and the commonly shared elements related to the basic principles, notable variations also exist. For example, the followers of the orthodox Sikh faith no longer lay emphasis on a contemporary living guru. Different Surat Shabd Yoga paths will vary in the names used to describe the Absolute Supreme Being (God), including Anami Purush (nameless power) and Radha Soami (lord of the soul); the presiding deities and divisions of the macrocosm; the number of outer initiations; the words given as mantras; and the initiation vows or the prerequisites that must be agreed to before being accepted as an initiate.
