= List of religious organizations =

This is a list of religious life by faith.

As it can be a matter of rebuttal as to whether an organization is in fact religious, organizations only appear on this list where the organization itself claims or has claimed to be a religious organization.

== Buddhist organizations ==
=== International ===
- International Buddhist Confederation
- International Network of Engaged Buddhists
- Sakyadhita International Association of Buddhist Women
- World Buddhist Forum
- World Buddhist Sangha Council
- World Buddhist Scout Brotherhood
- World Fellowship of Buddhists

=== Bangladesh ===
- Bangladesh Bauddha Kristi Prachar Sangha

=== Europe ===
- Buddhist Congregation Dharmaling (Slovenia)
- Buddhist Federation of Norway
- Buddhist Society (UK)
- Deutsche Buddhistische Union
- Diamond Way Buddhism
- European Buddhist Union
- Federación de Comunidades Budistas de España (Spain)
- Finnish Buddhist Union
- German Dharmaduta Society
- Italian Buddhist Union
- Network of Buddhist Organisations (UK)
- Swedish Buddhist Community
- Triratna Buddhist Community
- Union Bouddhiste de France

=== Hong Kong ===
- Hong Kong Buddhist Association

=== India ===
- Bengal Buddhist Association
- Buddhist Society of India

=== Japan ===
- Reiyūkai
- Risshō Kōsei Kai
- Ryomo Kyokai
- Soka Gakkai International

=== Ladakh ===
- Ladakh Buddhist Association
- Ladakh Nuns Association

=== Myanmar ===
- Buddha Sāsana Nuggaha
- International Meditation Centre
- Pa-Auk Society
- Young Men's Buddhist Association (Burma)

=== North Korea ===
- Korea Buddhist Federation

=== People's Republic of China ===
- Buddhist Association of China

=== Singapore ===
- Buddhist Research Society
- Singapore Buddhist Lodge
- Ti-Sarana Buddhist Association
- Vipassana Meditation Centre

=== South America ===
- South America Hongwanji Mission
- Questrynismo (Aztec)

=== South Korea ===
- Kwan Um School of Zen

=== Sri Lanka ===
- Buddhist Publication Society
- Maha Bodhi Society
- Mahamevnawa Buddhist Monastery
- Young Men's Buddhist Association

=== Taiwan ===
- Buddha's Light International Association
- Chung Tai Shan
- Dharma Drum Mountain
- Fo Guang Shan
- Tzu Chi

=== Thailand ===
- Dhamma Society Fund
- Sangha Supreme Council

=== United States ===
- American Zen Teachers Association
- Buddhist Churches of America
- Buddhist Global Relief
- Buddhist Peace Fellowship
- Buddhist Women's Association
- Cambridge Buddhist Association
- Dharma Realm Buddhist Association
- Foundation for the Preservation of the Mahayana Tradition
- Insight Meditation Society
- Plum Village Community of Engaged Buddhism
- Soto Zen Buddhist Association
- Young Buddhist Association
- Zen Peacemakers
- Zen Studies Society

=== Vietnam ===
- Vietnam Buddhist Sangha
- Vietnamese Buddhist Youth Association

== Christian organizations ==
=== Christian organizations by denominational family affiliation ===
==== Adventist ====
- Advent Christian Church
- Adventist Church of Promise
- Church of the Blessed Hope
- Church of God General Conference
- Creation Seventh Day Adventist Church
- General Association of Davidian Seventh-day Adventists
- General Conference Corporation of Seventh-day Adventists (Seventh-day Adventist Church)
  - List of Seventh-day Adventist colleges and universities
  - List of Seventh-day Adventist secondary schools
  - List of Seventh-day Adventist periodicals
  - Media ministries of the Seventh-day Adventist Church
- General Conference of the Church of God (Seventh-Day)
- International Missionary Society of Seventh-Day Adventist Church Reform Movement
- Sabbath Rest Advent Church
- SDARM General Conference (Adventist Reform Movement)
- United Sabbath-Day Adventist Church
- United Seventh-Day Brethren

==== Anglican ====
- List of Anglican dioceses
  - List of dioceses of the Anglican Church of Canada
  - List of dioceses of the Episcopal Church, United States
- List of Anglo-Catholic churches
- List of colleges and seminaries affiliated with the Episcopal Church
- List of Anglican devotional societies

==== Baptist ====
  - List of Baptist schools in the United States
  - List of Baptist colleges and universities in the United Kingdom
  - List of Baptist colleges and universities in the United States

==== Catholic ====
- List of Carthusian monasteries
- List of Roman Catholic missions in Africa
- Dioceses
  - List of Roman Catholic dioceses (alphabetical)
  - List of Roman Catholic dioceses (structured view)
  - List of Roman Catholic archdioceses
  - List of French dioceses in the 19th and 20th century
- Congregations
  - List of Roman Catholic churches in the Diocese of Charleston
  - List of parishes in the Roman Catholic Diocese of Fresno
  - List of parishes of the Roman Catholic Diocese of Honolulu
  - Parishes of the Apostolic Exarchate for Ukrainians in Great Britain
  - Parishes of the Apostolic Exarchate in Germany and Scandinavia for the Ukrainians
- Orders and societies
  - List of Ecclesial movements
    - Knights of Columbus
    - Knights of St. George
- Schools
  - List of Roman Catholic seminaries
  - List of Eastern Catholic seminaries
  - List of Catholic schools in the Philippines
  - Roman Catholic universities and colleges in the United States
  - List of independent Catholic schools in the United States
- Other
  - American Catholic Philosophical Association
  - Catholic Biblical Federation

==== Christian Scientists ====
- Church of Christ, Scientist
  - First Church of Christ, Scientist

==== Church of the East ====
- Dioceses of the Church of the East
  - Dioceses of the Church of the East to 1318
  - Dioceses of the Church of the East, 1318–1552
  - Dioceses of the Church of the East after 1552
- Ecclesiastical Provinces
  - Adiabene (East Syrian Ecclesiastical Province)
  - Beth Garmaï (East Syrian Ecclesiastical Province)
  - Beth Huzaye (East Syrian Ecclesiastical Province)
  - Maishan (East Syrian Ecclesiastical Province)
  - Nisibis (East Syrian Ecclesiastical Province)
  - Province of the Patriarch (East Syrian Ecclesiastical Province)
  - Fars (East Syrian Ecclesiastical Province)
  - Hulwan (East Syrian Ecclesiastical Province)
  - Merv (East Syrian Ecclesiastical Province)
  - Rai (East Syrian Ecclesiastical Province)
  - Salmas (Chaldean Archdiocese)
  - Shemsdin (East Syrian Ecclesiastical Province)

==== Eastern Orthodox ====
- Interparliamentary Assembly on Orthodoxy
- List of Eastern Orthodox dioceses and archdioceses
  - List of the dioceses of the Orthodox Church in America
- Congregations
  - Orthodox parishes in the United States
    - List of Eastern Orthodox parishes in Alaska
    - Eastern Orthodoxy in Hawaii

==== Evangelical ====
- List of evangelical seminaries and theological colleges

==== Lutheran ====
- List of Lutheran denominations
- List of Lutheran dioceses and archdioceses
- Nordic churches in London
- List of ELCA seminaries
- Seminaries of the Lutheran Church - Missouri Synod

==== Methodist ====
- List of African Methodist Episcopal Churches

==== Oriental Orthodox ====
- List of Coptic Orthodox Churches in the United States
- List of Coptic Orthodox Churches in Canada
- List of Eritrean Orthodox monasteries
List of Dioceses

Oriental Orthodox dioceses

- Seat of the Coptic Orthodox Pope of Alexandria
    - Coptic Diocese of Faras
  - Syriac Orthodox Church
    - Malabar Diocese (Malankara Orthodox Syrian Church)
  - Armenian Patriarch of Constantinople
    - Catholicos of Armenia
    - Holy See of Cilicia
  - Armenian Patriarch of Constantinople
  - Armenian Patriarchate of Jerusalem
  - Catholicos of the East and Malankara Metropolitan
    - Angamali West Orthodox Diocese
    - Angamaly Orthodox Diocese
    - Kolkata Orthodox Diocese
  - Syriac Orthodox Church
    - Dioceses of the Syriac Orthodox Church
    - Malankara Syriac Orthodox Church

==== Presbyterian ====
- List of Church of Scotland parishes

==== Protestant ====
- List of the largest Protestant churches of the world
- List of Protestant mission societies in Africa

==== Quaker ====
- List of Friends schools

==== Reformed (Calvinist) ====
- List of Calvinist educational institutions

==== Stone-Campbell movement ====
- List of universities and colleges affiliated with the Churches of Christ
- List of universities and colleges affiliated with the Christian churches and churches of Christ

==== Organizations of miscellaneous denominational families ====
- List of Messianic Jewish organizations
  - Chosen People Ministries
  - Jews for Jesus
  - Messianic Jewish Alliance of America
  - Union of Messianic Jewish Congregations

=== Christian organizations by purpose ===
==== Bible societies ====
List of bible societies

- American Bible Society
- Association of Theologically Trained Women of India
- Bible Society Australia
- Bible Society New Zealand
- Bible Society NSW
- Bible Society of India
- British and Foreign Bible Society
- Catholic Biblical Federation
- Deutsche Bibelgesellschaft
- Gideons International
- International Bible Society
- Japan Bible Society
- Norwegian Bible Society
- Pioneer Bible Translators
- Russian Bible Society
- Scottish Bible Society
- Society for Promoting Christian Knowledge
- Society of Biblical Literature
- Thailand Bible Society
- Ukrainian Bible Society
- United Bible Societies
- Wycliffe Bible Translators

==== Humanitarian aid ====
- World Vision International
- Caritas Internationalis
  - Caritas Africa
  - Caritas Asia
  - Caritas Europa
  - Caritas Latin America and Caribbean
  - Caritas Middle East and North Africa
  - Caritas Oceania

==== Congregations by country ====
Congregations by country
- List of churches in Taungoo, Burma
- Congregations in Canada
  - List of cathedrals in Canada
  - List of Ottawa churches
- List of cathedrals in India
- Congregations in France
  - List of basilicas in France
  - List of cathedrals in France
- List of cathedrals in Ireland
- Congregations in Italy
  - List of cathedrals in Italy
  - List of basilicas in Italy
  - List of churches in Florence
  - List of churches in Venice
  - List of churches in Malta
- List of cathedrals in New Zealand
- List of churches in Pakistan
- List of churches in Moscow, Russia
- List of churches in Sweden
- Congregations in the United Kingdom
  - List of collegiate churches in England
  - List of collegiate churches in Scotland
  - List of cathedrals in the United Kingdom
  - List of churches in Bristol
  - List of churches in Cheshire
  - List of churches in Gloucestershire
  - List of churches in Greater Manchester
  - List of churches in Hampshire
  - List of churches in Harrogate
  - List of churches in Kent
  - List of churches in Lincolnshire
  - List of churches in London
  - List of churches in Oxford
  - List of churches in Salford
- Congregations in the United States
  - List of churches that are National Historic Landmarks in the United States
  - List of churches in Philadelphia
  - List of cathedrals in the United States

==== Dioceses ====
- List of Anglican dioceses
- See List of religious organizations#Catholic
- See List of religious organizations#Church of the East
- List of Eastern Orthodox dioceses and archdioceses
- List of Lutheran dioceses and archdioceses
- See List of religious organizations#Oriental Orthodox

==== Mission organizations ====
- List of Christian mission hospitals
- List of Spanish missions
- Billy Graham Evangelistic Association
- Samaritan's Purse
- Team Expansion
- WEC International
- World Vision United States
- Youth With A Mission

==== Monasteries, abbeys, priories, and friaries ====
- List of monasteries, abbeys, and priories
Monasteries, abbeys, priories, and friaries by country
  - List of Christian religious houses in Austria
  - List of Christian religious houses in Belgium
  - List of Christian monasteries in Denmark
  - List of Christian religious houses in France
    - List of Benedictine monasteries in France
    - List of Cistercian monasteries in France
    - List of Premonstratensian monasteries in France
  - List of Christian religious houses in Germany
    - List of Christian religious houses in Brandenburg
    - List of Christian religious houses in Mecklenburg-Vorpommern
    - List of Christian religious houses in North Rhine-Westphalia
    - List of Christian religious houses in Saxony
    - List of Christian religious houses in Saxony-Anhalt
    - List of Christian religious houses in Schleswig-Holstein
    - List of Imperial abbeys
  - List of Christian religious houses in the Republic of Ireland
  - List of Christian monasteries in Norway
  - List of Christian monasteries in Sweden
  - List of Christian religious houses in Switzerland
  - List of Christian religious houses in Syria
  - Lists of Christian monasteries in the United Kingdom
    - List of abbeys and priories in England, (see also map link by county)
    - List of abbeys and priories in Scotland
    - List of monastic houses in Wales
    - List of abbeys and priories in Northern Ireland
    - List of abbeys and priories on the Isle of Man
    - List of monasteries dissolved by Henry VIII of England

==== Christian relief organizations ====
- International
  - Samaritan's Purse
  - World Relief
  - World Vision
  - The Salvation Army
  - Cross International
  - Caritas Internationalis
- Hospitals
  - List of Christian mission hospitals
  - List of Christian hospitals in China

==== Christian schools and colleges ====
- Association of Christian Universities and Colleges in Asia
- List of schools accredited by the Association of Theological Schools in the United States and Canada
- List of SVD schools

==== Christian trade unions and labor organizations ====
- Christian Trade Union Federation of Germany
- Christian Workers' Union
- French Confederation of Christian Workers
- Solidarity (South African trade union)
- World Confederation of Labour
- World Movement of Christian Workers
- Young Christian Workers

==== Miscellaneous Christian organizations ====
- List of parachurch organizations
  - Christian Vegetarian Association
  - Society of Christian Philosophers
  - Promise Keepers
  - Fellowship of Companies for Christ International

== Confucian organizations ==
- Holy Confucian Church
- Phoenix churches
- Supreme Council for the Confucian Religion in Indonesia
- Universal Church of the Way and its Virtue

== Hindu organizations ==
- Adi Brahmo Samaj and Sadharan Brahmo Samaj
  - Brahmo Conference Organisation
  - Rammohan College
  - World Brahmo Council
- American Meditation Institute
- Ananda Ashrama
- Ananda Marga Pracaraka Samgha
- Ananda World Brotherhood Colonies
- Arsha Vidya Gurukulam
- Art of Living Foundation
- Arya Samaj
  - Arya Pratinidhi Sabha of Fiji
  - D.A.V. College Managing Committee
- Bharat Sevashram Sangha
- Bochasanwasi Akshar Purushottam Swaminarayan Sanstha
- Brahma Kumaris
  - Adhyatmik Ishwariya Vishwa Vidyalaya
- Chinmaya Mission
- Devaswom boards in Kerala
- Divine Life Society
- Divine Light Mission
- Gaudiya Math
  - Gaudiya Mission
- Gita Press
- Himalayan Institute of Yoga Science and Philosophy
- Hindu Council of Russia
- Hindu Maha Sabha (Fiji)
- International Society for Krishna Consciousness
- International Swaminarayan Satsang Mandal
- International Swaminarayan Satsang Organisation
- International Vedanta Society
- Isha Foundation
- Italian Hindu Union
- Jagadguru Kripalu Parishat
  - Radha Madhav Dham
- Jagadguru Kripaluji Yog
- Kanchi Kamakoti Peetham
- Mata Amritanandamayi Math
- Narnarayan Dev Yuvak Mandal
- National Council of Hindu Temples
- Nikhil Manipuri Hindu Mahasabha
- Pakistan Hindu Council
- Pakistan Hindu Panchayat
- Parisada Hindu Dharma Indonesia
- Patanjali Yogpeeth
- Radha Soami Satsang Beas
- Radha Soami Satsang Sabha
- Radha Swami Satsang, Dinod
- Ramakrishna Math (a.k.a. Vedanta Society)
  - Ramakrishna-Vivekananda Center
  - Vedanta Society of New York
- Ramakrishna Mission
  - Swami Vivekananda Yoga Anusandhana Samsthana
- Saiva Siddhanta Church
- Sanatan Dharma Maha Sabha
- Santhigiri Ashram
- Sathya Sai Organization
- Satsang (Deoghar)
- Science of Identity Foundation
- Science of Spirituality (a.k.a. Sawan Kirpal Ruhani Mission)
- Self-Realization Fellowship
  - Yogoda Satsanga Society of India
- Siddha Yoga Dham Associates Foundation
- Sivananda Yoga Vedanta Centres
- Society of Abidance in Truth
- Sree Narayana Dharma Paripalana Yogam
  - Alwaye Advaita Ashram
  - Sree Narayana Trust
- Sri Aurobindo Ashram
  - Auroville Foundation
  - Sri Aurobindo International School, Hyderabad
- Sri Chinmoy Centres
- Sri Ramana Ashram
- Sri Sri Radha Govindaji Trust
- Sringeri Sharada Peetham
- Swaminarayan Mandir Vasna Sanstha
- Vishwa Madhwa Maha Parishat
- Vishwa Nirmala Dharma
- World Vaisnava Association

== Islamic organizations ==
=== International ===
- Ahl Al-Bayt World Assembly
- Barelvi movement
  - Dawat-e-Islami
  - Sunni Dawate Islami
  - World Islamic Mission
  - World Sunni Movement
- Deobandi movement
  - List of Deobandi organisations
  - Tablighi Jamaat
- International Islamic Council for Da'wah and Relief
- Jamaat-e-Islami
  - Bangladesh Jamaat-e-Islami
  - Hezbi Islami
  - Jamaat-e-Islami AJK
  - Jamaat-e-Islami Hind
  - Jamaat-e-Islami Kashmir
  - Jamaat-e-Islami Pakistan
  - UK Islamic Mission
- Society of the Muslim Brothers
  - International Union of Muslim Scholars
- Organisation of Islamic Cooperation
- World Assembly of Islamic Awakening
- The World Forum for Proximity of Islamic Schools of Thought

=== Afghanistan ===
- Taliban

=== Australia ===
- Australian Federation of Islamic Councils
- Australian National Imams Council
- Office of the Grand Mufti of Australia

=== Azerbaijan ===
- Religious Council of the Caucasus

=== Bangladesh ===
- Anjuman-i-Ulama-i-Bangala
- Bangladesh Jamaat-e-Islami
- Hefazat-e-Islam Bangladesh
- Islami Oikya Jote
- Islamic Foundation Bangladesh
- Bangladesh Anjumane Al Islah
- Bangladesh Anjumane Talamije Islamia

=== Bosnia and Herzegovina ===
- Islamic Community of Bosnia and Herzegovina

=== China ===
- Islamic Association of China

==== Hong Kong ====
- Chinese Muslim Cultural and Fraternal Association
- Hong Kong Islamic Youth Association
- Incorporated Trustees of the Islamic Community Fund of Hong Kong
- Islamic Cultural Association (Hong Kong)
- United Muslims Association of Hong Kong

==== Macau ====
- Islamic Association of Macau

=== Egypt ===
- Muslim Brotherhood

=== Great Britain ===
- Mosques & Imams National Advisory Board
- Islamic Forum of Europe
- Young Muslim Organisation
- Muslim Council of Britain
- British Muslim Forum
- Islamic Society of Britain
- Minhaj-ul-Quran UK
- Muslim Association of Britain
- Muslim Educational Trust
- Muslim Parliament of Great Britain
- Muslim Public Affairs Committee UK
- Sufi Muslim Council
- UK Islamic Mission
- World Islamic Mission

=== India ===
- All India Sunni Jem-iyyathul Ulama
- All India Muslim Students Federation
- All-India Muslim League
- Dakshina Kerala Jamiyyathul Ulama
- Haqqani Anjuman
- Indian Union Muslim League
- Jamaat-e-Islami Hind
- Jamiat Ulema-e-Hind
- Muslim Students Federation (Kerala unit)
- Muslim Students Federation (I. U. M. L.)
- Kerala Nadvathul Mujahideen
- Muslim Jamaat
- Samastha
- Samastha Kerala Jem-iyyathul Ulama (EK group)
- Samastha Kerala Sunni Students Federation
- Sunni Students Federation

=== Indonesia ===
- Al-Irshad Al-Islamiya
- Al-Mukmin Islamic school
- Alkhairaat
- Hidayatullah (Islamic organization)
- Indonesia Institute of Islamic Dawah
- Indonesian Association of Muslim Intellectuals
- Indonesian Islamic Propagation Council
- Indonesian Ulema Council
- International Center For Islam and Pluralism
- Islamic Defenders Front
- Jamiat Kheir
- Jaringan Islam Liberal
- Majelis Rasulullah
- Muhammadiyah
  - Aisyiyah
- Muslim Students' Association (Indonesia)
- Nahdlatul Ulama
  - Ansor Youth Movement
    - Banser
- Nahdlatul Wathan
- PERSIS (organization)
- Al-Rabithah al-Alawiyyah
- The Wahid Institute

=== Iran ===
- Islamic International Foundation of Cooperation

=== Kazakhstan ===
- Spiritual Administration of the Muslims of Kazakhstan

=== Malaysia ===
- National Council for Islamic Religious Affairs
  - Fatwa Committee of the National Council for Islamic Religious Affairs

=== Nigeria ===
- Jama'atu Nasril Islam
- Muslim Students Society of Nigeria
- Izala Society

=== Pakistan ===
- Tableeghi Jamat
- Tanzeem-e-Islami
- Dawat-e-Islami
- Jamaat-e-Islami Pakistan
- Minhaj-ul-Quran
- Jamaat-ul-Muslimeen

=== Russia ===
- Central Spiritual Administration of the Muslims of Russia
- Coordinating Center of North Caucasus Muslims
- Muftiate of the Republic of Dagestan
- Russian Council of Muftis
- Spiritual Administration of the Muslims of the Republic of Adygea and Krasnodar Krai
- Spiritual Administration of the Muslims of the Asian Part of Russia
- Spiritual Administration of the Muslims of the Republic of Bashkortostan
- Spiritual Administration of the Muslims of the Chechen Republic
- Spiritual Administration of the Muslims of the Republic of Ingushetia
- Spiritual Administration of the Muslims of the Kabardino-Balkarian Republic
- Spiritual Administration of the Muslims of the Karachay-Cherkess Republic
- Spiritual Administration of the Muslims of the Republic of North Ossetia–Alania
- Spiritual Administration of the Muslims of Russian Federation
- Spiritual Administration of the Muslims of the Republic of Tatarstan
- Spiritual Assembly of the Muslims of Russia

=== Saudi Arabia ===
- Council of Senior Scholars
- Permanent Committee for Scholarly Research and Ifta

=== Singapore ===
- Majlis Ugama Islam Singapura

=== Taiwan ===
- Chinese Islamic Cultural and Educational Foundation
- Chinese Muslim Association
- Chinese Muslim Youth League
- Taiwan Halal Integrity Development Association

=== Trinidad and Tobago ===
- Anjuman Sunnat-ul-Jamaat Association

=== Ukraine ===
- Spiritual Direction of the Muslims of Crimea (Kyiv)
- Spiritual Directorate of the Muslims of Crimea (Simferopol)
- Spiritual Directorate of Muslims of Ukraine
- Spiritual Administration of Muslims of Ukraine "Ummah"

=== Uzbekistan ===
- Muslim Board of Uzbekistan (replaced the Spiritual Administration of the Muslims of Central Asia and Kazakhstan)

== Jewish organizations ==
=== Jewish organizations by movement affiliation ===
==== Orthodox ====
===== Haredi (ultra-Orthodox) =====
- Edah HaChareidis
- Union of Orthodox Rabbis
- World Agudath Israel
  - Agudath Israel of America

====== Hasidic ======
- Chabad
  - Agudas Chasidei Chabad
  - North Eastern US Aleph Institute
  - Chabad.org
  - Colel Chabad
  - Federation of Jewish Communities of the CIS
  - Federation of Jewish Communities of Russia
  - Friendship Circle (organization)
  - Gan Israel
  - Rohr Jewish Learning Institute
  - Jewish Learning Network
  - Jewish Released Time
  - Jewish Relief Agency
  - Kehot Publication Society
  - Lubavitch Youth Organization
  - Merkos L'Inyonei Chinuch
  - Machneh Israel (Chabad)
  - N'shei Chabad
  - National Committee for the Furtherance of Jewish Education
  - Ohr Avner Foundation
  - Tzivos Hashem
  - Vaad Talmidei Hatmimim Haolami
- Satmar
  - Central Rabbinical Congress

====== Misnagdim ======
- Congress of the Jewish Religious Organizations and Associations in Russia

====== Modern Orthodox ======
- International Rabbinic Fellowship
- Khal Adath Jeshurun
- Orthodox Union
- Rabbinical Council of America

Religious Zionist

- Amana (organization)
- Arutz Sheva
- Bnei Akiva
- Center for Jewish–Christian Understanding and Cooperation
- Gush Emunim
- Makor Rishon
- Midrasha Zionit
- Mizrachi (religious Zionism)
  - Religious Zionists of America
- Ne'emanei Torah Va'Avodah
- The Temple Institute

==== Conservadox ====
- Union for Traditional Judaism
  - Institute of Traditional Judaism

==== Conservative ====
- Camp Ramah
- Fuchsberg Jerusalem Center for Conservative Judaism
- Jewish Theological Seminary of America
  - List College
- Rabbinical Assembly
- Schechter Institute of Jewish Studies
- United Synagogue of Conservative Judaism
  - United Synagogue Youth
    - Kadima (youth group)

==== Humanistic ====
- Society for Humanistic Judaism

==== Reconstructionist ====
- Jewish Reconstructionist Federation
- Reconstructionist Rabbinical Association
- Reconstructionist Rabbinical College

==== Reform ====
- American Council for Judaism
- World Union for Progressive Judaism
  - Communauté Juive Libérale
  - Israel Movement for Reform and Progressive Judaism
  - Liberal Jewish Movement of France
  - Liberal Judaism (United Kingdom)
  - Movement for Reform Judaism
  - Nederlands Verbond voor Progressief Jodendom
  - Netzer Olami
  - South African Union for Progressive Judaism (SAUPJ)
  - Union of Progressive Jews in Germany
  - Union for Progressive Judaism
  - Union for Reform Judaism

==== Non-denominational ====
- Academy for Jewish Religion (California)
- Academy for Jewish Religion (New York)
- Havurat Shalom
- High Council of B'nei Noah
- IKAR (Jewish congregation)
- International Federation of Rabbis
- Kabbalah Centre

=== Jewish organizations by purpose ===
==== Campus organizations ====
- Chabad on Campus International Foundation
- Hillel International

==== Outreach ====
- Aish HaTorah
- Association for Jewish Outreach Programs
- Chabad.org
- Gateways (organization)
- Kiruv Organization (Mizrachi)
- Oorah (organization)
- Project Genesis (organization)

==== Youth organizations ====
- Bnei Akiva
- Habonim Dror
- Hashomer Hatzair
- Netzer Olami
- Tzivos Hashem
- United Synagogue Youth
  - Kadima (youth group)

==== Miscellaneous Jewish organizations ====
- Chaverim (literally "Friends"), roadside assistance squads
- Chesed Shel Emes (literally "Kindness of Truth"), body recovery and burial assistance
- Misaskim (literally "People who Get Involved"), services for the care of the dead and the needs of mourners
- Shomrim (literally "Watchers"), neighborhood patrol
- ZAKA or "Zihuy Korbanot Ason" (literally, "Disaster Victim Identification") identification of victims of terrorist, accidents, or other disasters

== Meitei organizations ==
- Lainingthou Sanamahi Temple Board

== Pagan organizations ==
- Church of All Worlds
- Circle Sanctuary
- Covenant of the Goddess
- Covenant of Unitarian Universalist Pagans
- European Congress of Ethnic Religions
- Foundation for Traditional Religions
- Pagan Federation
- St. Priapus Church
- Unitarian Earth Spirit Network

=== Caucasian ===
- Council of Priests of Abkhazia

=== Baltic ===
- Romuva

=== Celtic ===
- Ar nDraiocht Fein
- Dun Ailline Druid Brotherhood
- Order of Bards, Ovates and Druids
- Reformed Druids of North America

=== Chinese ===
- Chinese Folk Temples' Management Association

=== Germanic ===
- Armanen-Orden
- Ásatrú Alliance
- Asatru Folk Assembly
- Ásatrúarfélagið
- Åsatrufellesskapet Bifrost
- Eldaring
- Forn Siðr — Ásatrú and Vanatrú Association in Denmark
- Germanische Glaubens-Gemeinschaft
- Gylfilites' Guild
- Heathen Front
- National Socialist Kindred
- Nordic Asa-Community
- Odin Brotherhood
- Odinic Rite
- Odinist Community of Spain – Ásatrú
- Samfälligheten för Nordisk Sed
- Swedish Forn Sed Assembly
- The Troth
- Verein für germanisches Heidentum
- Vigrid (Norway)
- The Odinic Rite Romania
- Asatru Rite Romania

=== Italic ===
- Pietas Comunità Gentile
- Nova Roma
- Roman Traditional Movement

=== Slavic ===
- Commonwealth of Pagan Communities of Siberia–Siberian Veche
- Native Polish Church
- Rodnover Confederation
- Rodzima Wiara
- Russian Public Movement "Course of Truth and Unity"
- Russian Public Movement of Renaissance–Golden Age
- Tezaurus Spiritual Union
- Union of Slavic Native Belief Communities

=== Turkic ===
- Aiyy Faith
- Tengir Ordo

=== Wiccan ===
- Aquarian Tabernacle Church
- Church and School of Wicca
- Church of Universal Eclectic Wicca
- Circle Sanctuary
- Covenant of the Goddess
- Doreen Valiente Foundation
- New Reformed Orthodox Order of the Golden Dawn
- Panthean temple
- The Rowan Tree Church
- Wiccan church
- Witch School

== Shinto organizations ==
- Association of Shinto Shrines

== Jain organizations ==
- Dakshin Bharat Jain Sabha
- Vishwa Jain Sangathan
- Digambar Jain Mahasabha
- JAINA

== Sikh organizations ==
- British Sikh Report
- Chief Khalsa Diwan
- City Sikhs
- Delhi Sikh Gurdwara Management Committee
- Gurudwara Khalsa Sabha, Matunga
- Gurdwara Sri Guru Singh Sabha
- Haryana Sikh Gurdwara Parbandhak Committee
- Kamber Darbar
- Khalsa Diwan Society Vancouver
- Nishkam SWAT
- Pakistan Sikh Council
- Pakistan Sikh Gurdwara Prabandhak Committee
- President of Shiromani Gurdwara Parbandhak Committee
- Rashtriya Sikh Sangat
- Sachkhoj Academy
- Shiromani Akali Dal
- Shiromani Gurdwara Parbandhak Committee
- Sikhs for Justice
- Tat Khalsa
- United Sikhs
- World Sikh Organization
- 3HO (Healthy, Happy, Holy Organization)

=== Sikh sects ===
Radha Soami

- Radha Soami Satsang Beas
- Radha Soami Satsang Sabha
- Radha Swami Satsang, Dinod
- Science of Spirituality
  - Sawan Kirpal Ruhani Mission

== Taoist organisations ==
- Chinese Taoist Association
- Fung Loy Kok Institute of Taoism
- Hong Kong Taoist Association
- Taoist Church of Italy

== Unitarian, Universalist, and Unitarian Universalist ==
- International Council of Unitarians and Universalists (dissolved in 2021)
- Australia and New Zealand Unitarian Universalist Association
- Canadian Unitarian Council
- Church of the Larger Fellowship
- Covenant of Unitarian Universalist Pagans
- Deutsche Unitarier Religionsgemeinschaft
- European Unitarian Universalists
- General Assembly of Unitarian and Free Christian Churches (Unitarian Christian Association; Unitarian Earth Spirit Network)
- Meadville Lombard Theological School
- Starr King School for the Ministry
- Southeast Unitarian Universalist Summer Institute
- Unitarian Church of Transylvania
- Unitarian Universalist Association
- Unitarian Universalist Buddhist Fellowship
- Unitarian Universalist Christian Fellowship
- Young Religious Unitarian Universalists (continental organization ended in 2008)

== Organizations of new religious movements ==
- Aetherius Society
- African Theological Archministry
- Ausar Auset Society
- Church of the Creator
- Church of Satan
- Eckankar
- Elan Vital, formerly Divine Light Mission
- Messiah Foundation International
  - Kalki Avatar Foundation
- Never Ending Gardens
- John Templeton Foundation
- Joy of Satan Ministries
- Temple of Set
- The Satanic Temple
- Universal Life Church

=== New Age organizations ===
- Association for Research and Enlightenment
- The Family
- Findhorn Foundation

=== Rosicrucian organizations ===
- Ancient Mystical Order Rosae Crucis
- Rosicrucian Fellowship

=== Theosophical organizations ===
- Lucis Trust
- New Acropolis
- Theosophical Society Adyar
- Theosophical Society Pasadena
- Theosophical Society Point Loma-Covina
- United Lodge of Theosophists

== Interreligious organizations ==
- Association for Consciousness Exploration
- Center for Religion, Ethics and Social Policy
- The Becket Fund for Religious Liberty
- Berkeley Psychic Institute
- European Congress of Ethnic Religions
- Institute on Religion in an Age of Science
- Interfaith Worker Justice
- National African Religion Congress
- Partners for Sacred Places
- Sea of Faith
- The World Peace Prayer Society

=== Inter-Abrahamic organizations ===
- Center for Jewish–Christian Understanding and Cooperation
- The Coexistence Trust
- Faith & Values Media
- International Catholic–Jewish Liaison Committee
- International Council of Christians and Jews
- International Fellowship of Christians and Jews
- Interreligious Coordinating Council in Israel
- Religious Coalition for Reproductive Choice

== See also ==
- List of religions and spiritual traditions
- Major religious groups
