= FTR =

FTR may refer to:

== Arts and entertainment ==
- FTR (professional wrestling), a wrestling team
- Forget The Rules, an Australian television show

== Transport and vehicles ==
- FTR (bus), a British rapid-transit bus system
- Finist'air, a French airline
- DRDO Floating Test Range, an Indian military ship
- Indian FTR, a standard motorcycle of the Indian Motorcycle marque
- FTR Moto, a British motorcycle parts manufacturer

== Other uses ==
- Fabriques de tabac réunies, a Swiss cigarette manufacturer
- Family Tracing and Reunification, during disasters
- Federal Taxpayer Registry (Spanish: Registro Federal de Contribuyentes), Mexican tax identification number
- Foundation for Traditional Religions, in Russia
- Financial transmission right, in electricity markets
- Formylmethanofuran—tetrahydromethanopterin N-formyltransferase
- Frontier Communications, an American telecommunications company
