= Droupgyu Wangmo =

French Tibetan Buddhist nun and prison chaplain

- Title: Lama

Personal life
- Born: Fabienne Guillaume Paris, France
- Occupation: Buddhist nun; prison chaplain

Religious life
- Religion: Buddhism
- School: Tibetan Buddhism
- Lineage: Karma Kagyu

Senior posting
- Teacher: Gendun Rinpoche

Droupgyu Wangmo (born Fabienne Guillaume) is a French Buddhist nun of the Karma Kagyu lineage of Tibetan Buddhism. She is known for her participation in long-term meditation retreats within the Dhagpo Kagyu monastic community in France and for her involvement in the development of Buddhist prison chaplaincy in the French correctional system.

She has also been recognized internationally for her contributions to Buddhist monastic life and social service, including being listed among the recipients of the Outstanding Women in Buddhism awards presented by the International Women's Meditation Center Foundation.

== Early life ==
Droupgyu Wangmo was born in Paris, France. She was raised in France and later pursued studies in the field of traditional Chinese medicine. During this period she practiced qigong, which introduced her to contemplative disciplines connected with Asian philosophical traditions.

Her early exposure to meditative practices through qigong contributed to a growing interest in spiritual questions concerning the nature of mind and suffering. This interest eventually led her to explore Buddhist teachings and meditation.

Wangmo first encountered Tibetan Buddhism during a visit to the Buddhist center Dhagpo Kagyu Ling in southwestern France, one of the principal centers of the Karma Kagyu tradition in Europe. There she took refuge in Buddhism and met teachers including Jamgon Kongtrul Rinpoche and meditation master Gendun Rinpoche.

The teachings she received at Dhagpo Kagyu Ling had a lasting influence on her spiritual development and contributed to her decision to pursue monastic training within the Karma Kagyu lineage

== Monastic training ==
In 1994 Wangmo entered the first of two traditional three-year meditation retreats at Dhagpo Kundreul Ling, a Karma Kagyu retreat center in central France. The retreat program combines intensive meditation practice with scriptural study and ritual training in accordance with the Karma Kagyu monastic tradition.

During these retreats practitioners typically undertake foundational practices (ngöndro) and advanced meditation methods such as Mahamudra. Wangmo completed the retreat curriculum under teachers associated with the Dhagpo Kagyu lineage founded by Gendun Rinpoche.

During this period she took monastic vows and received the name Karma Droupgyu Wangmo. After completing the retreats she continued to reside within the Dhagpo Kagyu monastic community, combining contemplative practice with teaching and administrative responsibilities.

== Prison chaplaincy ==
Wangmo later became involved in Buddhist chaplaincy in France. Working with the Union Bouddhiste de France (UBF), she helped organize Buddhist spiritual support for inmates in French prisons.

She subsequently served as the national Buddhist prison chaplain and coordinated a network of Buddhist chaplains who provide meditation instruction, pastoral care, and spiritual guidance to prisoners in several correctional institutions.

Her work contributed to the development of Buddhist chaplaincy within the French prison system and expanded opportunities for incarcerated individuals to engage with meditation and Buddhist teachings.

== Recognition ==
For her contributions to religious service and prison chaplaincy, Wangmo was appointed a Knight of the Ordre national du Mérite, a national honor of France.

In 2024 she was also recognized internationally as one of the recipients of the Outstanding Women in Buddhism award presented by the International Women's Meditation Center Foundation.

== Administrative activities ==
Wangmo has also participated in administrative roles connected with Buddhist and religious organizations in France.

Her biography and activities are also referenced in cultural and art-historical databases related to Himalayan and Tibetan Buddhist traditions.

== See also ==
- Women in Buddhism
- Karma Kagyu
- Union Bouddhiste de France
