= World Brahmo Council =

- Established: 1864 (162 years ago)
- Founded at: British India
- Type: Religious organisation
- Purpose: Protection of Brahmoism
- Headquarters: India
- Region served: Worldwide
- Members: 5
- Official languages: Bengali, Hindi, English
- Affiliations: Brahmoism
- Website: true.brahmosamaj.in
- Formerly called: Brahmo Representative Council

The World Brahmo Council is the new name for the "Brahmo Representative Council", which was founded in 1864. In 2009, the erstwhile Brahmo Representative Council had five nominated members consisting of one from Adi Brahmo Samaj, two from Adi Dharm, one each from Sadharan Brahmo Samaj South and North.

In 2007 the old registered Council was convened under the name "World Brahmo Council" by the Brahmo Conference Organisation "to protect Brahmoism's assets – especially its good name and theology" since many websites put up by Brahmos had lapsed and fallen into the hands of spammers and being used as doorways to pornographic sites. Headed by a Brahmo cyberlaw expert and after taking due legal recourse outside India, many websites were recovered to Brahmoism that year.
