= International Foundation =

The following organizations have been called International Foundation:

- al-Aqsa International Foundation, a charity with alleged ties to the Palestinian militant organization Hamas
- Benevolence International Foundation, a purported nonprofit charitable trust based in Saudi Arabia
- Gaddafi International Charity and Development Foundation, an international non-governmental organization (NGO) with headquarters in the Libyan capital Tripoli and offices in Chad, Germany, the Philippines, and Sudan
- Gandhi Memorial International Foundation, a.k.a. Mahatma Gandhi International Foundation, a controversial non-profit organization run by Yogesh K. Gandhi, born Yogesh Kothari, who claims to be related to Mahatma Gandhi
- International Foundation for Art Research, created a database that led to the Art Loss Register
- International Foundation for Civil Liberties, a non-profit organization and political pressure group established by Russian tycoon Boris Berezovsky
- International Foundation for Electoral Systems, provides assistance for elections in new and emerging democracies
- International Foundation for Gender Education, American non-profit transgender advocacy organization devoted to "overcoming the intolerance of transvestitism and transsexualism brought about by widespread ignorance"
- International Foundation for Human Rights and Tolerance, a human rights group affiliated with Scientology
- International Foundation for Protection Officers, a non-profit organization to address training and certification of security officers and their supervisors
- International Foundation for Science
- IslamIFC (Islamic International Foundation of Cooperation), a nonprofit, non-governmental organization that partners with North American Muslims, non-Muslims, and organizations to promote mutual understanding and cultural exchange
- Oasis International Foundation, a foundation to promote knowledge and understanding between Christians and Muslims, with focus on Christian minorities in Muslim countries
- Osho International Foundation, an organization that propagates the views of the Rajneesh movement, a religious movement founded by Indian guru and mystic Osho
- Reggio Children - Loris Malaguzzi Centre Foundation, to promote education and research
- Singapore International Foundation, a not-for-profit organization that seeks to nurture active global citizens and friends for Singapore
- Talif International, an international non-profit and charitable Foundation headquartered in Kannur, India
- The Fellowship (Christian organization) or The Family, a Christian political organization
