= Sticky Fingers Brownies =

Cannabis delivery business

Sticky Fingers Brownies was an underground marijuana brownie delivery business, established by Meridy Volz in San Francisco. It was an early example of a large-scale cannabis delivery service, patronized by recreational users in the 1970s. By the 1980s, the business shifted to provide medical cannabis relief to HIV/AIDS patients, becoming a part of the burgeoning medical marijuana movement. At its height, Sticky Fingers Brownies sold 10,000 brownies per month. The business was profiled in Home Baked, a memoir by Alia Volz, published in April 2020.

== History ==
In 1975, Meridy Volz (née Domnitz), an artist, moved to San Francisco from Milwaukee. She said, "San Francisco was like a land of promise: liberal and artistic and free." She described her look at the time as "I was a full tilt, full on boogie hippie... Big head of frizzy hair, no makeup, no bra, lots of jewelry, and a leather vest with fringe." She needed money as a young artist, so she joined a friend to sell coffee and baked goods at Fisherman's Wharf. At the time, the Fisherman's Wharf district had a range of performers and personalities. Robin Williams was a street performer, while Penn & Teller worked as magicians in the area. Volz and her friend found the most success selling marijuana brownies, stored in a Guatemalan pouch. Her friend decided to move to Europe, and she offered the business to Volz. To make a decision, Volz consulted the hexagrams of the I Ching. She explained, "I picked up the coins and I tossed a hexagram, and then asked, 'Is it correct to start to sell brownies?' And very quickly, my answer became clear that this was my destiny."

In 1976, Volz officially established Sticky Fingers Brownies. The name came from the fact that, when handling the brownies, one had sticky fingers. Volz ran the business and Barbara Hartman-Jenichen was the primary baker. The brownies were all baked in a "tiny Wedgewood oven." They used the castoff leaves from sinsemilla cannabis plants, grown outdoors in Humboldt and Mendocino counties. When baking the brownies, they found that, if they added less flour and cooked for less time, the brownies became more potent. This recipe became a signature part of their business. Later, Barbara left, and Carmen Vigil became the primary baker.

At some point, Volz became romantically involved with Doug Volz, who had dropped out of University California, Berkeley in order to study at Berkeley Psychic Institute. Meridy married Doug Volz, and he joined her in the business. The couple worked and operated out of a large warehouse in the Mission District. They were known to deliver brownies in flashy, attention-grabbing outfits. Doug later explained, “The way to be invisible in a situation is to stand out.” Meridy and Doug had a daughter, Alia, in 1977. They were known to push the baby stroller with bags of brownies hanging from the sides. By 1977, the business was distributing about 10,000 brownies per month. The brownies were often split into four separate doses by customers, and Volz never charged more than a couple of dollars per brownie.

Sticky Fingers Brownies delivered bulk orders to countercultural businesses, such as Castro Camera, Cafe Flore, the Castro Theatre, Falcon Studios, Double Rainbow Ice Cream, and the Village Deli. As described by Alia Volz: "My mom came up with this really innovative business plan where she sold exclusively to people on the job. So she would go around to boutiques and restaurants and real estate offices and even medical offices and only sell to the people who were working." Cleve Jones was a customer, out of his unofficial office at Village Deli. It was also rumored that columnist Herb Caen bought the brownies through a friend, as well as Sheriff Richard Hongisto. In 1979, Volz temporarily closed the business, because her I Ching hexagrams said there would be a drug bust. In his weekly column, Herb Caen wrote, "Fridays will never be the same.”

Meridy and Doug Volz were deeply interested in divination, tarot, astrology, and psychism. They believed that, if they followed the I Ching, they could be protected from police raids. However, during this period, there were drug busts in primarily African-American and Latino parts of the Bay Area, such as Bayview-Hunter's Point and West Oakland. Meanwhile, Volz and her primarily white clientele experienced minimal police issues. As Alia Volz, daughter of the founder later commented, "There's certainly racial privilege involved in the fact that my mom never got busted."

In the 1980s, Meridy and Doug moved the family to Willits in Mendocino County. However, they would regularly visit San Francisco to deliver brownies. By that time, HIV/AIDS had begun to ravage the LGBT community of San Francisco. Marijuana began to be seen as a therapeutic aid, which could help with pain and nausea relief. By the mid-1980s, Meridy had divorced Doug, and she moved back to San Francisco with her daughter. Many members of the Castro community, including Sylvester, sought out the cannabis-related aid from Sticky Finger Brownies, which did many home deliveries. As Alia Volz explains,

Nobody thought weed was going to cure AIDS. But it helped with the wasting syndrome, which manifested with a total loss of appetite and crushing nausea. Cannabis was good for that. It helped with insomnia, depression, pain. So people began to turn to cannabis to help feel a little better while this horrible, horrible thing was going on. And in the case of the wasting syndrome, it helped them eat. It helped them hang on longer. It became very important... And my mom, meanwhile, stayed underground. She didn't get busted. She didn't go to the press. But she worked throughout all of these years to get edibles to people who needed them.

In total, Sticky Fingers Brownies operated for about 25 years. Meridy Volz was never arrested during those years, although other marijuana distributors and activists, such as Brownie Mary, were arrested. She eventually decided to close her business when cannabis clubs became common in the San Francisco Bay Area, which decreased demand. Volz is now retired, and she lives in Desert Hot Springs, California. She paints and teaches art classes to seniors and teens.

== Portrayal in popular culture ==
In July 2016, the story of Meridy Volz was featured in the 47th episode of Criminal podcast.

In April 2020, Home Baked, the memoir of Alia Volz, was published by Houghton Mifflin Harcourt. For the book, she interviewed Dennis Peron (a friend and customer), Cleve Jones, and other prominent members of the LGBT and cannabis community.
