= List of Catholic missions in Africa =

This is a list of Roman Catholic missions in Africa.

- Augustinians of the Assumption
- Carmelites
- Catholic Medical Mission Board
- Catholic Missions of Africa Kenya
- Catholic Near East Welfare Association
- Catholic Relief Services
- Catholic World Missions
- Columban Missions
- Cross International Catholic Outreach
- Franciscan Missions
- Hospitaler Bros. St. John of God Missions
- International Catholic Migration Commission
- Jesuits
- Mary'’s Meals
- Mercy Corps
- Missionaries of Africa
- Missionaries of the Poor
- Missionary Oblates
- Missionary Sisters of Mary Immaculate
- Missionary Sisters of Our Lady of Africa
- Missionary Society of St. Paul
- Missionhurst
- Paris Evangelical Missionary Society, PEMS or, in French, Société des Missions Evangéliques de Paris
- Pontifical Mission Societies
- Salesian of Don Bosco Missions
- Society of African Missions
- Sudan Relief Fund

== See also ==
- Christianity in Africa
- List of Christian Missionaries
- List of converts to Christianity
- List of Protestant mission societies in Africa
- Mission (Christian)
- Timeline of Christian missions
