= Alia Volz =

American author

- Born: December 15, 1977; San Francisco, CA
- Notable works: Home Baked: My Mom, Marijuana, and the Stoning of San Francisco

Website
- aliavolz.com

Alia Volz (born December 15, 1977) is an American author. Her memoir Home Baked: My Mom, Marijuana, and the Stoning of San Francisco recounts her upbringing in San Francisco and the story of the Sticky Fingers Brownies marijuana brownie delivery business. It was a National Book Critics Circle Award Autobiography finalist in 2020.
