= Restoring Family Links =

Services provided by the Red Cross and Red Crescent movement

Restoring Family Links (RFL) is a program of the Red Cross and Red Crescent Movement, more specifically the International Committee of the Red Cross (ICRC) and National Red Cross and Red Crescent Societies involving activities that aim to prevent separation and disappearance, look for missing persons, restore and maintain contact between family members and clarify the fate of persons reported missing. The activities are carried out by the components of the RFL is sometimes also referred to as family tracing.

The ICRC and National Red Cross and Red Crescent Societies form together a global network, the Family Links Network. This network works across international borders, present with staff and volunteers at grass-roots level worldwide, to locate people and put them back into contact with their relatives, observing of the principles of the International Red Cross and Red Crescent Movement.

The most common situations in which the Family Links Network takes action are when loss of contact is caused by armed conflict or other situations of violence, natural or man-made disasters, migration, or other humanitarian circumstances—such as enabling detainees to maintain contact with their families while in prison. RFL services are provided free of charge.

== History ==
The ICRC's work to restore family links goes back to 1870 and the Franco-Prussian War. The institution obtained lists of French prisoners held by German forces, which were used to inform families about the fate and whereabouts of the soldiers.

During the formation of the Red Cross, the Red Cross Movement's founder, Henry Dunant, wrote of taking a message from dying soldier Claudius Mazuet to his parents in A Memory of Solferino. A similar effort was undertaken in the Balkans in 1912. Here the ICRC set up an agency to help families send packages to family members held prisoners.

During the First World War, in accordance with the mandate it had received from the 4th International Conference of the Red Cross in 1887, the ICRC set up the International Agency of Prisoners of War. By the end of the war it had handled over 7 million records.

During the Second World War the ICRC created the Central Prisoners of War Agency, now the Central Tracing Agency in Geneva. The Agency gathered and recorded data received from governments about prisoners of war. The information was used to respond to enquiries from families who were looking for news about their loved ones. By the end of 1946, the Agency had received and forwarded more than twenty million letters and cards addressed to prisoners of war and interned civilians.

Since then, tracing people separated by conflict, disaster and migration has become a core element of the Red Cross and Red Crescent work. In 2012, the ICRC together with the National Red Cross and Red Crescent Societies handled more than 279,000 family messages, facilitated 227,500 phone calls, registered over 3,500 separated children and reunited more than 2,300 children with their families.

== About ==
Depending on the context, Restoring Family Links services include the following:

- looking for individuals on behalf of their family;
- restoring and maintaining family contact;
- registering and keeping track of individuals so as to prevent their disappearance and to inform their families of their whereabouts;
- reuniting and repatriating family members;
- helping the authorities clarify what has happened to persons unaccounted for;
- collecting, managing and forwarding information on the dead.

Services are offered under thorough guidelines described in manuals for caseworkers and other volunteers and staff. Availability depends on global and local conditions, and may change in keeping with current events.

The Family Links website familylinks.icrc.org, managed by the ICRC in cooperation with National Red Cross and Red Crescent Societies, describes the locally available Restoring Family Links services in more than 150 countries and provides contact details of the Red Cross and Red Crescent in each country.

=== Looking for family members ===
Looking for missing persons usually involves several steps, starting with a person putting forward a request (Tracing Request) to a National Society or the ICRC. The Tracing Request gathers information which might be helpful to find the sought person, and is often obtained via a personal interview with the enquirer. The information in the request is compared to various data depending on the situation, such as lists of persons detained, lists of persons registered as receiving, or having received, treatment in hospital, information received where there is a telephone hotline, lists of dead or people who are safe and well.

The ICRC or the National Society will use all possible means to search for the person, including going to the last known address, contacting neighbours of the sought person, visiting displaced people and refugee camps, consulting institutions, the authorities or other organizations, broadcasting names of sought persons through the media etc. When a large-scale emergency occurs, online tracing is also possible. Online tracing services have been used since 1996 in connection with various conflicts and disasters, to publish lists of names and information on:

- people who are safe and well;
- hospital patients;
- people who are looking for relatives;
- sought persons or those who are dead;
- addressees of Red Cross messages who are difficult to reach.

Individuals can access these lists directly on the webpage to look for the names of their family members. They can also publish their details on the webpage such as their name and location when they are safe and well, or the name of a sought relative with a request for news.

=== Restoring contact ===
Restoring contact between family members, when their location is known, is done via various means, such as short letters called Red Cross Messages (RCMs), normal telephones or satellite phones.

Technological developments have led to a decrease in the use of RCMs in favour of telephones. The total number of calls made for RFL purposes increased from 3,958 to 210,096 between 2008 and 2012.

However, in some contexts such as for instance the Democratic Republic of Congo, phone and postal services can be limited, and the Red Cross message are sometimes brought personally by Red Cross volunteers, often on bicycles over very long distances to remote villages across the country.

=== Reuniting families ===
The national authorities have the primary responsibility for reuniting separated families following conflict, disaster migration or other situations of humanitarian need. National Societies and the ICRC may assist in family reunification if this is possible and if security conditions allow.

For refugees, it is generally the United Nations High Commissioner for Refugees (UNHCR), the International Organization for Migration (IOM) and/or the relevant embassies that help with family reunification. They work together with National Red Cross and Red Crescent Societies and the ICRC, if necessary.

In the case of the family reunification for unaccompanied and separated children, the Family Links network collaborates with UNICEF.

=== Missing persons and their families ===
In cases where family contact cannot be restored, the ICRC continues its efforts to clarify the fate and whereabouts of the missing person, but is also supporting the families of missing persons with other needs.

The ICRC's work on the missing historically consisted of a few core activities, primarily dissemination of the rules of international humanitarian law (IHL), which require that states work to prevent disappearances, and bilateral interventions requesting parties to the conflict to search for and provide information, after separation, in accordance with IHL.

In recent years, the organization has developed a more holistic and multidisciplinary approach for the families of missing persons aiming long-term support mechanisms for families of the missing. The main goal of this approach is to help people rebuild their social lives and find emotional well-being.

=== Related services ===
In some circumstances, the ICRC or National Societies may also help with other services. The ICRC, for example, can issue a travel document. An ICRC Travel Document is issued to meet the specific humanitarian needs of asylum seekers, refugees, vulnerable migrants, displaced or stateless persons who, due to the lack of appropriate identity papers, cannot return to their country of origin or of habitual residence or go to a country willing to receive them, either permanently or for temporary asylum. The ICRC Travel Document was created in 1945 to help tens of thousands of concentration camp survivors, former prisoners of war, deportees, forced labourers and other stranded civilians who had no valid travel documents. It is valid only for a one-way travel, and dependent on the receiving country issuing a visa, if required.

Other documents issued by the ICRC include, among others, attestations of arrestation or detention, or information to the public via the ICRC archives.

The public can request information from the ICRC archives related to World War II cases.

== Legal provisions related to Restoring Family Links ==
In situations of armed conflicts, receiving news about the fate of family members, family reunification, and clarifying the fate of the missing is a right under international law. The four Geneva Conventions and their additional protocols state, for example, that governments should take all possible steps to facilitate the reunification of separated families.

The ICRC has a special role to play with regards to International Humanitarian Law such as

- Forwarding family news; regarding in particular the right of prisoners of war and internees to send and receive letters and cards (Geneva Convention (GC) III, art.71 and GC IV, art.107), and that of individuals to receive news from relatives (GC IV, art.25). The Conventions describe what form correspondence may take, how its content is to be checked and in which circumstances it is exempt from postal charges. They also define Parties' obligations with regard to the forwarding of personal effects.
- Tracing missing persons; regarding in particular the right of families to know their relatives' fate (Additional Protocol (AP) I, art.32-34) and Parties' obligation to provide all necessary particulars for the identification of protected persons when deceased and details on the whereabouts of their graves (GC III, art.120 and GC IV, art.130).
- Family reunification; in particular, measures for the evacuation of children (AP I, art.78), the reunion of dispersed families (GC IV, art.26 and AP I, art.74) and the transfer or repatriation of prisoners or other protected persons (GC III, art.119; GC IV, art.128, 134 and 135).

== Role of the National Societies and the ICRC in Restoring family links ==
The RFL activities of the various components of the International Red Cross and Red Crescent Movement, in particular the ICRC and the National Societies, are drawn from the Geneva Conventions and their Additional Protocols, the Movement's Statutes, and the resolutions of the International Conference of the Red Cross and Red Crescent and those of the Council of Delegates.

=== National Societies ===
National Societies act as auxiliaries to the authorities in their respective country and embody the principles of the Movement.

Each National Society responds to humanitarian needs in their local context by a range of activities. Regarding RFL, this implies the search for family members, restoring contact between family members and, if possible, helping to reunite families. These activities may extend well beyond the end of a conflict or a natural disaster. National Societies cooperate with each other, with the ICRC and with the International Federation on activities related to RFL.

=== The ICRC in RFL ===
Through its delegations, the ICRC carries out direct action to help separated families whenever required and possible. An extensive, long-term field presence and close cooperation with National Societies place the ICRC close to beneficiaries.

The ICRC is responsible for ensuring the operation of the Central Tracing Agency (CTA) as provided for in the Geneva Conventions. The CTA acts as coordinator and technical adviser to National Societies, ICRC delegations and governments on RFL. It helps strengthen the capacity of National Societies in RFL and coordinates these activities with the organisational development and disaster preparedness support provided by the International Federation.
