= Southeast Unitarian Universalist Summer Institute =

- Abbreviation: SUUSI
- Formation: 1950
- Type: religious organization, summer camp
- Purpose: To provide a one-week experience evoking the best within us, in concert with Unitarian Universalist principles.
- Location: Cullowhee, NC on the campus of Western Carolina University
- Affiliations: Council of Unitarian Camps and Conferences
- Website: https://www.suusi.org

Southeast Unitarian Universalist Summer Institute (SUUSI) is an intergenerational community of approximately 1,000 people who gather each July. They describe themselves as a Unitarian Universalist (UU) summer camp. People attending SUUSI predominantly abide by the teachings of Unitarian Universalism, but many participants belong to other denominations or faiths. Attendees range in age from newborn to elderly.

== Mission ==
The mission of SUUSI is to provide a one-week experience evoking the best within us, in concert with Unitarian Universalist principles. SUUSI offers the opportunity to share an intergenerational environment of love, personal freedom, ethics, and joy in an intentional, nonjudgmental community.

== History ==
In early 1950, some thirty-five individuals gathered "to share in joyful community" at Lake Waccamaw, North Carolina. Since 1990 it took place on the campus of Virginia Tech, in Blacksburg, but in 2008 it returned to the college campus of Radford University in Radford, Virginia, where it had been held previously. In 2016 SUUSI moved to the campus of Western Carolina University in Cullowhee. In 2023, SUUSI returned to Radford University, Virginia.

== Activities ==
=== Spirituality ===
Many people attend SUUSI for its spiritual impact. Daily programming includes minister-led morning talks as well as evening worship services.

=== Workshops ===
Taught entirely by volunteers, SUUSI workshops cover a range of topics, including art, history, science, technology, politics, religion and culture.

=== Nature ===
Many participants take nature trips to experience the local environment in all its biodiversity. These trips may focus on local trails, caves, rivers or terrain; likewise, they may focus on specific wildflowers, trees, animals, insects, etc. SUUSI nature trips practice a Leave No Trace (LNT) outdoor ethics.

=== Nightlife ===
SUUSI's evening programming includes nightly performances and events. Typical offerings include cabarets, talent shows, dance venues (restricted by age), a coffeehouse lounge and movie nights. SUUSI frequently attracts professional-level entertainers for nightly performance.

== Governance ==
SUUSI is an independent, incorporated, not-for-profit organization governed by its bylaws and policy manual. SUUSI has a 14-member Board of Trustees, of which 11 are voting members. The Board chooses the Director of the Institute and approves the operating budget. Board positions are both elected and appointed. Unitarian Universalist churches are organized into regional districts. Several SUUSI Board positions are appointed by the three southeastern UU district boards. At large and youth representatives are elected at SUUSI. SUUSI is a member of the Council of Unitarian Universalist Camps and Conferences.

== Operations ==
The Core Staff is composed of the Director and staff leaders who coordinate the numerous departments and activities associated with this one-week Institute and camp. Departments include Communications, Nurture (previously Denominational Affairs), Equipment, Locations, Nature, Nightlife, Registration/Housing, Age-Group Programming (including Youth, Middlers, Teens, Young Adults and Middlers), Treasurer, and Workshops. In addition, many SUUSI attendees complete the totally volunteer staff needed to manage all the camp activities. All SUUSI staff members report to a Core Staff member, ultimately reporting to the Director, who in turn reports to the above-mentioned board.

== See also ==
- Unitarian Universalist Association
