= Child displacement =

Act of separation of children from their parents

Child displacement is the complete removal or separation of children from their parents and immediate family or settings in which they have initially been reared. Displaced children includes varying categories of children who experience separation from their families and social settings due to several varied reasons. These populations include children separated from their parents, refugees, children sent to boarding schools, internally displaced persons or IDPs, and asylum seekers. Thus child displacement refers to a broad range of factors due to which children are removed from their parents and social setting. This include persecution, war, armed conflict and disruption and separation for varied reasons.

According to UNHCR (United Nations High Commissioner for Refugees), as of 2002, there were approximately 22 million displaced children in the world, several of whom are displaced for a very long time spanning years. Children in worst affected areas in armed conflict or disruption face an average of 6 to 7 years of displacement.

The internationally accepted and acknowledged definition of a "child" is anyone who is under the age of 18 regardless of any context.

== Forms ==
- Internal Displacement – involves relocation of children from areas or geographical locations caught in strife during civil war or armed conflicts. Currently there are about 13.5 million internally displaced children around the world.
- Planned Displacement – includes relocation of children away from their parents by Government as per policy e.g.: American Indian Boarding schools, removal from non custodial parent because of divorce proceedings, separation due to boarding schools, relocation of children with relatives (kinship care) for economic or social reasons, removal of children from family by law enforcement for judicial reasons. Purposeful displacement includes relocation of children from areas of conflict in order to avoid recruitment into war.
- Large-scale Displacement – involves refugees, asylum seekers, and child soldiers

== Psychological effects of disruption in parent–child relationships ==
Psychologists and social-behavioral scientists agree that children thrive better both psychologically and developmentally in two-parent families. John Bowlby (1969) stated that there is a sensitive period that was sensitive to the development of attachment, during which attachment is easily formed between the child and its parents. Early research on adoptions gives support to this view, though scholars state that the sensitive period is actually quite extensive. This might imply that children need longer period of interaction with their parents than previously thought.

=== Effects on attachment development ===
The development of attachment occurs as a result of the process of reciprocal interaction between parent and the child. This reciprocal interaction helps the child to discriminate its parents from others and helps develop emotional relationships with its parents. Infant-parent attachment helps to develop psychological security, self-confidence and enables the development of trust in other humans. The amount of time spend together is not the only factor that influences the development of attachments. Some threshold level of interaction is also needed for attachment to develop. A threshold level of interaction is required to establish attachments, and regular opportunities for interaction are crucial. Children in both single-parent and two-parent families seem to be better adjusted when they enjoy warm and affirmative interactions with two parents who are actively involved. Empirical literature shows that children need regular interaction with attachment figures in order to maintain relationships. Extended separation of the child from either of the parent is detrimental as it hinders the development of attachment and relationship between the child and the parent. It is because of this reason that it becomes extremely difficult to re-establish relationship between child and parents once it is disrupted. For this reason it is best to avoid such disruptions. A child's relationship with its parents has significant influence on the nature of social, psychological and emotional development of the child. Empirical research also shows that disruption in relationship between child and its parents has adverse effects on a child's development. Those children who are hindered from having stable and regular interaction and meaningful relationship with either of the parent are at a higher potential of psychological risk. Thus children are more likely and able to attain their psychological potential when they are able to have healthy and regular relationship with both their parents.

The ideal situation of relationship between children and parents is one in which there is everyday interaction between the child and its parents. This includes interaction in various family and social contexts like play, basic care, limit setting, putting to bed etc. Everyday activities promotes and maintains the development of trust and helps to strengthen and deepen parent–child relationships.

=== Divorce and separation from non-custodial parent ===
In terms of divorce and separation adverse effects have been noted due to severed father-child relationship. Therefore, in terms of separation due to divorce it is important to maintain regular interaction between child and both parents. It is therefore unfortunate that in contemporary practice relationship is not fostered between the child and the non custodial parent in divorce proceedings. So when it is beneficial, children face potential risk due to removal from or disappearance of their non custodial fathers. This risk is added on with the other baggage of problems that occurs due to divorce including financial burden and less social support. For children separation from parents is stressful and painful.

=== Long-term impact of separation of child from its parents ===
The NICHD Study of Early Child Care was designed to assess the long-term outcomes of non parental care giving. Non Parental care giving involved both relatives (kinship care) and non relatives (Day care). The NICHD study was based on Uri Bronfenbrenner's ecological theory (1979). Analysis of the effects of family and child care revealed that the characteristics of the family and the nature and quality of the mothers relationship with the child was a significantly better predictor of children's outcome. Prolonged separations from parents have profound disruptive influence on children's development. Such prolonged separations include separations due to death, institutionalization which entails sending a child to live in an institution or setting without parents, divorce and desertion of the child by parent and hospitalization or prolonged absence due to illness. Prolonged exposure to poor institutional care could lead to despair, apathy, and deficits in social responsiveness. According to Rutter (1979), it is the failure to develop secure attachment with parents that leads to problems in social responsiveness. Institutionalization is extreme form of separation of the child from its parents. In their study of children in the Bucharest Early Intervention Project (BEIP), Smyke et al. (2010) found that children who remained institutionalized had higher levels of insecure-other attachment than children in a foster care condition. Children placed in foster care exhibited higher levels of secure-attachment. Additionally, Smyke et al. (2010) found that children who were placed into the foster care condition prior to 24 months of age were more likely to display secure attachment at the 42-month follow-up.

==== Emotional abuse ====
Children also experience significant harm due to neglect, and emotional child abuse can manifest through rejection, intimidation, or isolation of the child.

==== Sleeper effect ====
With the view that children develop through adolescence by building on prior periods and that some effects of early experiences during child rearing might manifest later on in what is called as "Sleeper effect". It may be seen that effects of child rearing may be seen even later.

== See also ==
- Emotional abandonment
- Native American boarding schools
- Restoring Family Links
- Trump administration family separation policy
- UNHCR
