= Covenant of Unitarian Universalist Pagans =

Religious organization in the United States

- Abbreviation: CUUPS
- Formation: 1985
- Type: Religious organization
- Purpose: Serve Unitarian Universalist community who identify with Paganism or Neopaganism
- Headquarters: Cincinnati, Ohio, US
- Location: United States
- Affiliations: Unitarian Universalist Association
- Website: cuups.org

The Covenant of Unitarian Universalist Pagans (abbr: CUUPS) is an independent affiliate of Unitarian Universalists who identify with the precepts of classical or contemporary Paganism: celebrating the sacred circle of life and guiding people to live in harmony with the rhythms of nature. CUUPS members foster the development of "liturgical materials based on earth- and nature-centered religious and spiritual perspectives" as well as encourage "greater use of music, dance, visual arts, poetry, story, and creative ritual in Unitarian Universalist worship and celebration." Many members of CUUPS embrace the cycle of seasons and beauty of all life forms found in nature. Unlike many mainline religious sects, Unitarian Universalists and Pagans both value the "sacredness in the present world rather than on an afterlife." CUUPS is a community open to all Unitarian Universalist members and those who support the tenets.

== History ==
The history of Unitarian Universalist Paganism started ten years before the founding of CUUPS. In 1977, the Unitarian Universalist general assembly passed the Women and Religion Resolution as a commitment to responding to concerns about patriarchal norms within the association. Some members were searching for a more goddess-based alternative to the traditional, masculine deity. The first Unitarian Universalist Pagan worship service was held in 1980 in East Lansing, Michigan.

In 1985, CUUPS was formed at the UUA General Assembly in Atlanta, Georgia. It was chartered by the UUA in 1987 and incorporated as a not for profit organization in 1997. Thanks to the UUP, a Sixth Source was adopted by the UU General Assembly in 1995. This Sixth Source encompasses: "Spiritual teachings of earth-centered traditions which celebrate the sacred circle of life and instruct us to live in harmony with the rhythms of nature."

Ecofeminist and neopagan Starhawk has been a pivotal advocate for CUUPS. She was influential in the Unitarian Universalist Association to include nature-centered traditions among their sources of faith. As an author and contributor to thirteen books, Starhawk has broadened Pagan theology. She led numerous workshops for, and was an active member of CUUPS.

CUUPS was an independent affiliate of the Unitarian Universalist Association until 2007, then a related organization, and as of 2015 a Covenanting Community of the UUA. There are now over 110 chapters of CUUPS.

== Bylaws ==
The Bylaws of CUUPS include its affiliation with the UUA, statement of purpose, membership requirements, information on the board of trustees, financial administration, rules for amendments, and rules. The board consists of between three and thirteen members, with a three-year term, must meet quarterly, and the president may not serve more than two terms consecutively. The bylaws were approved in 2014, with revisions last approved in 2017.

== Purpose ==
According to Article III of the bylaws, the exact purpose of CUUPS is to promote "the practice and understanding of Pagan and Earth-centered spirituality within the Unitarian Universalist Association, enabling networking among Pagan-identified Unitarian Universalists, providing for the outreach of Unitarian Universalism to the broader Pagan community, providing educational materials on Paganism and Earth-centered spirituality for Unitarian Universalist congregations and for the general public, promoting interfaith dialogue, encouraging the development of theological and liturgical materials based on Pagan and Earth-centered religious and spiritual perspectives, encouraging greater use of music, dance, visual arts, poetry, story and creative ritual in Unitarian Universalist worship and celebration, providing a place or places for gathering and for worship, and fostering healing relationships with the Earth and all of the Earth's children."

The CUUPS mission is to collaborate with the UU six sources and seven principles, with particular focus on the sixth source. CUUPS functions as a networking community of UU Pagans and other nature-based spiritualities. While not directly related to Wicca or other explicit Pagan paths, it does embrace them within its ministerial tradition. Members and friends receive the online CUUPS Bulletin, which reports continental and local chapter activities and explores contemporary Paganism. The organization maintains ties to the UK-based Unitarian Earth Spirit Network, which serves a similar role of representing contemporary Pagan spirituality in the British Unitarian community.

== Principles ==
The following is an affirmed covenant from Unitarian Universalist Associations:

- The inherent worth and dignity of every person.
- Justice, equity and compassion in human relations.
- Acceptance of one another and encouragement to spiritual growth in our congregations.
- Free and responsible search for truth and meaning
- The right of conscience and the use of the democratic process within our congregations and in society at large.
- The goal of world community with peace, liberty, and justice for all.
- Respect for the interdependent web of all existence of which we are a part. "The living tradition we share draws from many sources:
- Direct experience of that transcending mystery and wonder, affirmed in all cultures, which moves us to a renewal of the spirit and an openness to the forces which create and uphold life
- Words and deeds of prophetic women and men which challenge us to confront powers and structures of evil with justice, compassion, and the transforming power of love
- Wisdom from the world's religions which inspires us in our ethical and spiritual life.
- Jewish and Christian teachings which call us to respond to God's love by loving our neighbors as ourselves.
- Humanist teachings which counsel us to heed the guidance of reason and the results of science, and warn us against idolatries of the mind and spirit.
- Spiritual teachings of Earth-centered traditions which celebrate the sacred circle of life and instruct us to live in harmony with the rhythms of nature
