= Unitarian Earth Spirit Network =

- The official logo of the UESN, based upon the flaming chalice motif and featuring a tree.
- Abbreviation: UESN
- Formation: 1990
- Type: religious organisation
- Purpose: To serve the Nature / Earth / Creation centred religious voice within British Unitarianism.
- Location: United Kingdom
- Key people: Rev Peter Roberts
- Affiliations: General Assembly of Unitarian and Free Christian Churches
- Website: ukunitarians.org.uk/earthspirit/
- Formerly called: Unitarian Pagan Network, Unitarian New Age Network

The Unitarian Earth Spirit Network (UESN) is an association of Unitarian Universalists based in the U.K. that seeks to represent a Nature/Earth/Creation centred religious voice within the church. It was assisted by Jo Rogers as Secretary/Treasurer. The UESN provides a forum for this group and became a recognised, credible part of the British Unitarian movement.

== History ==
The UESN was founded in 1990 by Rev. Peter Roberts. It began as a part of the British Unitarian sect known as the "Unitarian Pagan Network." This name was eventually changed because some members were unhappy with the negative associations they had for the term 'pagan'. For a while, it was known as the "Unitarian New Age Network" until the group settled on their current name, "Unitarian Earth Spirit Network."

== Affiliations ==
In addition to its links to the main British Unitarian community, the organisation maintains ties to the U.S.-based Covenant of Unitarian Universalist Pagans, which serves a similar role of representing contemporary pagan spirituality in the American Unitarian community.

UESN publishes a quarterly newsletter called File, which members receive with an annual subscription.

== See also ==
- Modern paganism in the United Kingdom
