= Fellowship of Companies for Christ International =

Fellowship of Companies for Christ International (FCCI) is an American organization of Christian business people, founded in 1977 as Fellowship of Companies for Christ in Atlanta, Georgia.

== Overview ==
The FCCI is an organization dedicated to advancing the Kingdom of God through business, with a special focus on integrating faith principles into corporate management. Over the years, the FCCI has evolved into a platform for executives interested in integrating biblical principles into their business practices. The organization offers a variety of resources and events to promote discussion on the interface between faith and business. The FCCI promotes the establishment of communities and networks among Christian businesspeople to support the dissemination of values and principles they represent.

FCCI views business as a method to connect with individuals globally, aligning with Christian values. FCCI is part of a larger movement that encompasses a range of companies from Fortune 500 to proprietorships, advocating for the allowance of faith expression within the workplace in compliance with Title 7 of the US Federal Law. It's estimated by FCCI that there are around 10,000 workplace study and prayer groups.

In 2024, FCCI introduced the first AI assistant dedicated to Christian business leadership under the name of Aida by FCCI. Aida is designed to help Christian business leaders with answers to questions on demand. Questions like:

- What does stewardship mean in Christian business?
- How can I make business decisions that honor God?
- How do I balance faith and profitability in my business?

FCCI's 5-Stage Transformational Journey is a framework designed to help Christian business leaders integrate their faith into their work effectively. Here’s a brief overview of each stage:

1. Standing Up in Your Calling: Recognizing and embracing God’s unique calling in your life and business, it encourages personal reflection and stewardship of resources.
2. Stepping Forward in Faith: Encourages bold steps based on faith, acknowledging that God owns the business and you are a steward of it. Aligning business goals with biblical principles is essential.
3. Positioning for Excellence: Focuses on establishing a culture of excellence within your organization, setting high standards, and striving for quality in all endeavors.
4. Maximizing Kingdom Impact: Aims to create a lasting impact in the community and beyond, emphasizing unity among believers and serving others with your resources.
5. Multiplying Others: Involves developing and mentoring the next generation of leaders, encouraging knowledge sharing, and creating a legacy for God’s Kingdom.
