= List of Protestant mission societies in Africa =

This is a list of Christian missions in Africa.

- 4africa
- Africa Inland Mission
- Algiers Mission Band
- Anglican Frontier Missions
- Apostolic Faith Mission of South Africa
- Basel Mission
- Church Mission Society
- Cowley Fathers
- International Missionaries for Christ
- London Missionary Society
- Mission Africa
- Mission Aviation Fellowship
- Missionary Bishop
- Rhenish Missionary Society
- Society for the Propagation of the Gospel in Foreign Parts
- Sudan Interior Mission
- Heart of Africa Mission
- Zambezi Industrial Mission

== See also ==
- Christianity in Africa
- List of Christian missionaries
- List of converts to Christianity
- List of Roman Catholic missions in Africa
- Mission (Christian)
- Timeline of Christian missions
