= Sadharan Brahmo Samaj =

Religious organization in Kolkata, India

The Sadharan Brahmo Samaj
- Bengali: সাধারণ ব্রহ্ম সমাজ
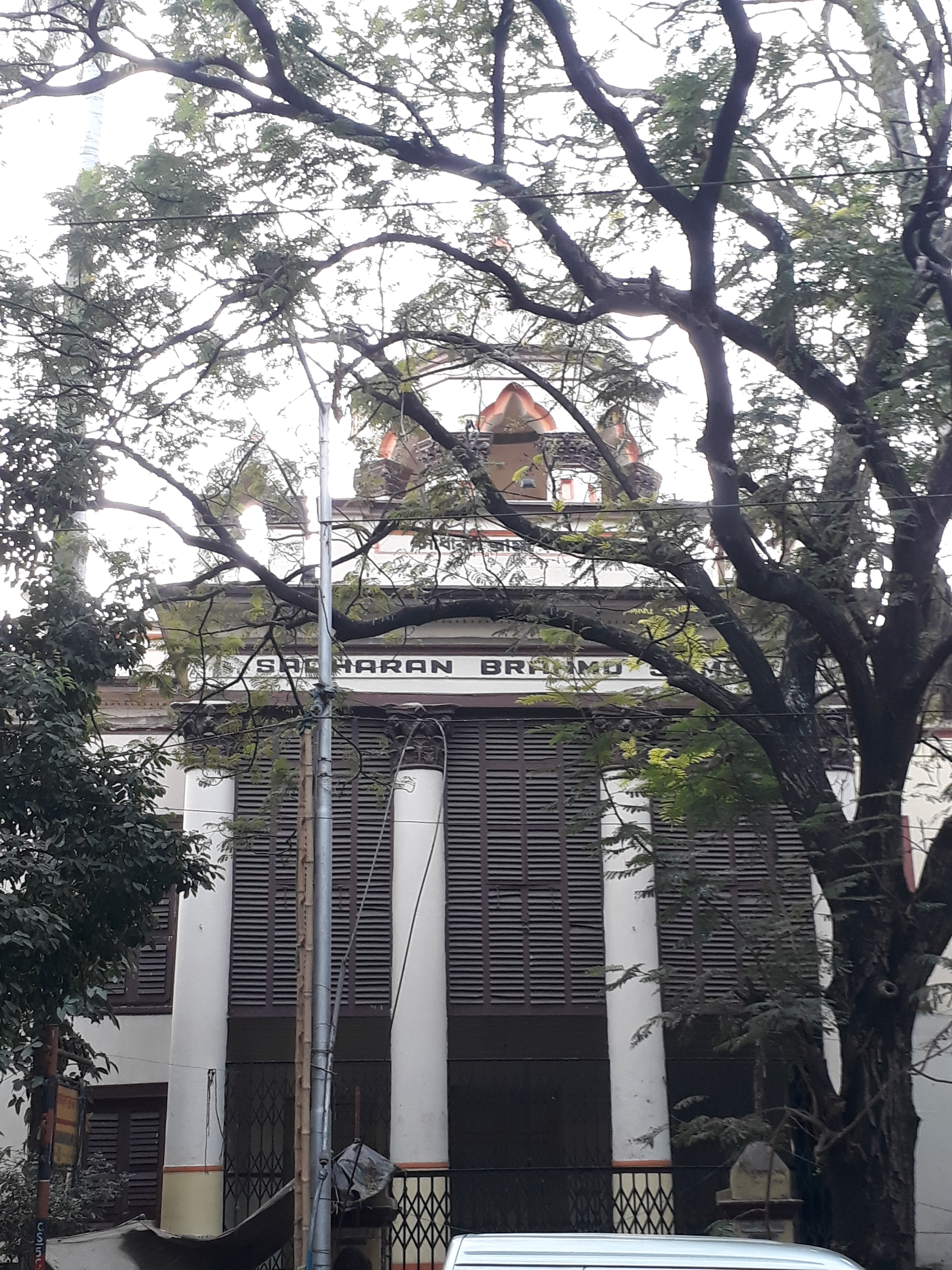
- Sadharan Brahmo Samaj building, Bidhan Sarani, Kolkata
- Predecessor: Brahmo Samaj
- Established: 15 May 1878 (148 years ago)
- Founders: Ananda Mohan Bose, Umesh Chandra Dutta, Sivnath Sastri
- Founded at: Calcutta, British India
- Type: Religious organisation
- Purpose: Educational, Philanthropic, Religious studies, Spirituality
- Headquarters: Kolkata, West Bengal, India
- Official languages: Bengali, English
- Main organ: Governing Body & Council Body
- Affiliations: Brahmoism
- Website: thesadharanbrahmosamaj.org

The Sadharan Brahmo Samaj or Universal Brahmo Samaj is a division of Brahmoism formed as a result of schisms in the Brahmo Samaj first in 1866 and then another in 1878.

Due to ideological differences, Keshab Chandra Sen, one of Brahmo Samaj's key leaders, formed a separate organisation called the Bramho Samaj of India in 1866. The new society was most influential in the struggle for social reform by encouraging education of women, campaigning for the remarriage of widows and for legislation to prevent child marriages.

When Sen arranged for his daughter to marry the Prince of Cooch Behar, both parties were well under age. He was thus violating his own reformist principles, and many of his followers rebelled, forming a third samaj – Sadharan Brahmo Samaj, on May 15, 1878, at the Town Hall in Kolkata. Ananda Mohan Bose, Shibchandra Deb and Umeshchandra Datta were the key leaders of it. Debendranath Tagore was actively involved with the organisation. The Sadharan Brahmo Samaj gradually reverted to the teaching of the Upanishads and carried on the work of social reform.
