= National African Religion Congress =

The National African Religion Congress (NARC) is an organization based in Philadelphia, Pennsylvania. Formed by Gro Mambo Angela Novanyon Idizol in 1998, the organization aims to seek tolerance for African religions, as well as creating credentialing standards for priests and priestesses and working on legal issues of concern to such practitioners, such as having the legal power to perform marriages. NARC also publishes a Directory of Priests and Priestesses, and has organized conferences drawing practitioners of African-based religion from around the world.
