= Sudan Relief Fund =

Humanitarian nonprofit organization

Sudan Relief Fund (SRF) is a U.S.-based nonprofit organization that provides humanitarian and development assistance in South Sudan and the Nuba Mountains region of Sudan.

== History ==
The organization began operations in 1998.

It was previously known as the Bishop Gassis Sudan Relief Fund.

In 2013, National Catholic Reporter reported on a legal dispute involving Bishop Macram Max Gassis and the organization, including his removal from the board and the charity's renaming to Sudan Relief Fund.

== Activities ==
According to EWTN News and Catholic News Agency, Sudan Relief Fund has focused on humanitarian aid, infrastructure improvement, and development in South Sudan and the Nuba Mountains, working with local Catholic dioceses and supporting projects including Mother of Mercy Hospital.

EWTN News reported in 2023 that the organization also built and continued to support the Catholic University of South Sudan, and described its work as combining immediate relief, such as food and medicine, with longer-term institutional development.

In 2020, ACI Africa reported that SRF was evaluating projects in Sudan and South Sudan and quoted local church leaders describing the group's support for diocesan hospitals, peace interventions in Western Equatoria, St. Paul's National Major Seminary, and work in the Diocese of El Obeid.

In 2024, Angelus News reported that the Diocese of Malakal, with help from partners including the U.S.-based Sudan Relief Fund, was providing daily rations for refugees returning from Sudan to South Sudan during the famine and displacement crisis.

In 2025, Radio Tamazuj reported that Sudan Relief Fund USA partnered with the Western Equatoria State government and the Catholic Diocese of Tambura-Yambio to open the Graham Pediatric Center at St. Theresa Mission Hospital in Nzara County, South Sudan.

== Public profile ==
In 2019, Time profiled Bishop Eduardo Hiiboro Kussala and noted that he was in New York City raising money for Sudan Relief Fund while discussing efforts to bring peace to South Sudan.

National Catholic Reporter reported that Bishop Gassis had appeared numerous times on the Catholic television network EWTN, commenting on conditions in Sudan and asking viewers to donate to the fund.

== Organization ==
ProPublica Nonprofit Explorer lists the legal entity as Sudan Relief Fund Inc, based in Washington, D.C., with tax-exempt status since April 1999 and EIN 52-2148976.

Publicly available filings indexed by ProPublica include Form 990 returns for multiple tax years.
