= Chinese Folk Temples' Management Association =

The Chinese Folk Temples' Management Association (中国民间寺庙文化管理协会 Zhōngguó mínjiān sìmiào wénhuà guǎnlǐ xiéhuì) is an organisation for the registration, standardisation and administration of the folk religious temples of China; such temples are considered the primary carriers of traditional culture. It was formally established at the end of 2015, with the approval of the government of China, with the purpose of creating a "Harmonious Society" realising the "Chinese Dream" with Chinese characteristics (gods). In its function, the organisation may be compared to Japan's Association of Shinto Shrines.

The association has links with the Chinese Water-Wind Philosophy Association (中国风水家协会 Zhōngguó fēngshuǐ jiā xiéhuì) and with the Chinese Yijing Philosophy Association (中国易经哲学家协会 Zhōngguó Yìjīng zhéxué jiā xiéhuì). The association was founded in Henan province, and is responsible towards the Ministry of Culture. In other areas of China, different measures for the administration of folk religious temples have been taken in the 2010s; for instance, in Zhejiang province 34,880 folk religious temples, mediated by a variety of local associations, have come under the aegis of the Bureau of Folk Faith of the provincial Bureau of Ethnic and Religious Affairs.

== See also ==
- Religion in China
- Chinese Buddhist Association
- Chinese Taoist Association
- Holy Confucian Church
