= Federación de Comunidades Budistas de España =

Federación de Entidades Budistas de España
- Formation: 1992
- Members: 25 member organisations
- Official language: Spanish
- Secretary General: Ana Ramiro Nieto
- President: Luis Morente Leal
- Affiliations: EBU

The Unión Budista de España, Federación de Entidades Budistas de España (UBE-FEBE), formerly known as the Federación de Comunidades Budistas de España, is a religious federation constituted under the protection of the L.O. 7/1980 of 5 July, on Religious Freedom, which brings together the different Buddhist entities, both traditional and modern, present in Spain. Those Buddhist religious entities with at least three years of seniority, registered in the Registry of Religious Entities of the Ministry of the Presidency, and admitted by the UBE Council, can join the federation.

The federation has been operating since 1991 as the official representation of Buddhism in Spain towards the public authorities and society. Its current president is Luis Morente Leal, and previous presidents have been Florencio Serrano Prior, Antonio Mínguez Reguera, Miguel Ángel Rodríguez Tarno and Enrique Caputo Rivera.

In October 2007, following a request made by the federation, the Ministry of Justice granted Buddhism the status of well-established religion in Spain.

On the 3rd of December 2018, the extraordinary council of the then Federation of Buddhist Communities of Spain, meeting in Madrid, decided to change its name in its statutes to Unión Budista de España, Federación de Entidades Budistas de España (UBE-FEBE).

This organisation sits on the Advisory Commission for Religious Freedom of the Ministry of the Presidency, as well as on the board of trustees of the public Foundation Pluralism and Coexistence. Internationally, it is a member of the European Buddhist Union.

Initially made up of five communities, the UBE-FEBE currently brings together most of the main Buddhist entities in Spain. From these entities depend, in addition, a large number of practice centres.

The organisational structure, functions and other data of the UBE-FEBE can be consulted in its Statutes, through the federation's website.
