= Dakshina Kerala Jamiyyathul Ulama =

Principal Sunni-Shafi'i scholarly body in central and southern Kerala

- Formation: 26 June 1955; 71 years ago
- Founder: Raeesul Ulama M Shihabudeen Moulavi PK Younus Moulavi Umarkutty Moulavi Fareed Moulavi
- Founded at: Jonakappuram, Kollam
- Type: Islam Sunni
- Legal status: Running
- Headquarters: Jonakappuram, Kollam, Kerala
- Region served: India
- President: KP Aboobackar Hasrath
- General Secretary: Thodiyur Muhammed Kunju Moulavi

Dakshina Kerala Jami-yyathul Ulama is the principal Sunni-Shafi'i and Hanafi scholarly body in southern Kerala. The council administers mosques, institutes of higher religious learning and madrasas in southern Kerala districts of Alappuzha, Kottayam, Idukki, Pathanamthitta, Kollam, Ernakulam and Trivandrum.

It was established at Jonakappuram kochu palli, Kollam on 26 June 1955 as "Travancore-Cochin Jamiyyathul Ulama". The body also supervises the Kerala Muslim Jama-ath Federation.

== Wings ==
- Dekshina Kerala Islam Matha Vidhyabhasa Board (DKIMVB)
- DKIMV Examination Board http://exams.dakshinakerala.com/
- Dekshina Kerala Lajnathul Muallimeen (DKLM)
- Kerala Muslim Jamath Federation (KMJF)
- Kerala Muslim Yuvajana Federation (KMYF)
- Dekshina Kerala Islamic Students Federation (DKISF)
- Raeezul Ulama publishing Buero
- Annaseem
- Al Busthan Magazine

== Institutions and establishments ==
- Jamia Mannaniya, Varkkala
- Mannaniya Banath Yatheemkhana, Mukkunnam, kadakkal
- Umarul Farooq Yatheemkhana, Kollam
- Thahfeelul Quran College
- Mannaniya College of Arts & Science, Pangode
- Mannaniya Public School
- Mannaniya Islamic Academy
- Mannaniya Arabic College
- Mannaniya Masjid
- Fathima Masjid, Kollam
- Mannaniya Auditorium

== History ==
The elements of the Kerala Jamiyyathul Ulama or the Samastha Kerala Jamiyyathul Ulama did not exist in the southern regions like Travancore. On 22 June 1955, a meeting of some scholars was convened in Kollam as a result of the advice of Qutwabi Musliyar and Pangil Ahmedkutty Musliyar, the leaders of Samastha, that it was better to form another organization of scholars there to overcome this deficiency. A temporary committee was formed with M Shihabuddin Moulavi as the convener. As a result of their efforts, a large convention was held on 2 August at the VJT Hall in Thiruvananthapuram, one-and-a-half months later, bringing together most of the scholars from the southern direction. It was here that the third Ulama organisation in Kerala was formed. P.K. Yunus Moulavi was the president, Umarkutty Moulavi was secretary and M. Shihabuddin Moulavi was the vice-president, and a working committee was formed with OBT Fareed Moulavi as treasurer. The organisation was also renamed as Dakshina Kerala Jamiyyathul Ulama.

The ideal and style of functioning of the Dakshina Kerala Jamiyyathul Ulama was the same as that of the Samastha Kerala Jamiyyathul Ulama. Their attitude towards the Mujahid and Jamaat factions was no different from that of Samastha. Like other Ulama organisations, the Dakshina Kerala Jamiyya Ulama has been making valuable contributions in the field of religious education. The South Kerala Islamic Religious Education Board is one of its parent organizations.

== DKIMV Board ==
'Dakshina' educational activities were started in association with Lajnathul Islamia Association, which was based in Aluva. Lajnath merged with the Dakshina Kerala Islamic Religious Education Board and a new committee headed by Alavikkunji Moulavi started functioning. There are many madrasas in south Kerala affiliated to this education board. There are about 1600 madrasas and more than 4800 teachers under the Dakshina Kerala Islamic Religious Education Board. The board, which unified the curriculum in madrasas and suggested exemplary changes in the curriculum and teaching training, made promising reforms in the madrassa system. Lajnat-ul-Muallimeen is an organisation working under 'Dakshina' for teacher training and their welfare work. A welfare fund is also functioning under it to provide financial assistance to madrassa teachers. DKIMV Board General secretary: Kadakkal Abdul Azeez Moulavi

== Kerala Muslim Yuvajana Federation ==
The Dakshina Kerala Muslim Yuvajana Federation is another subsidiary organisation of 'Dakshina'. The main aim of this organization is to channel the talent and energy of young people towards doing good deeds. Apart from religious awareness, social issues are also actively discussed through this organization. The organization conducts libraries, nursery schools, and discussion conferences. It is a remarkable achievement that due to the efforts of the Dakshina Kerala Jamiyyathul Ulama, the Jamaats in the south have been brought under a unified organization. Thereby consolidating the leadership of the Jamaat into an organization that was strong enough to address the common issues of the community. This organization was formed by the conference of 'Dakshina' held at Karbala in Kollam.

== Kerala Muslim Jamaath Federation ==
In 1981, the Kerala Muslim Jama'ath Federation was established under the leadership of Kadakkal Abdul Aziz Moulavi. The federation's strong leadership has taken the initiative and is looking for solutions to communal issues. The South Kerala Jamiyyathul Ulama has not hesitated to say that they are against family planning and the civil code, even though it can be criticized as conservative. Dakshina has exercised all its ability to systematically get the demands of the community to be recognised by the authorities in an organized manner in an attempt to get benefits based on the Mandal Commission report and against the attempt to deprive a large section of Muslims of the benefit of reservation by creating a distinction of Muslim mappila.

== Mannaniya Islamic University ==
The contribution of South Kerala Jamiyyathul Ulama in the field of higher education is also invaluable. Only the Mannania Islamic University, which is famously run in Varkala, is enough to assess their achievements in this field. Mannaniyya is known as the higher educational institution of religious studies. Though established in 1986, today as a result of the efforts of the governing board of the university, an Arabic college, a hifd college, a boarding madrasa and an orphanage that provides training to memorize the Quran are functioning beautifully. The syllabus and curriculum here have been arranged on the pattern of Bakhiyathu Swalihath of Vellore.
