= Cross International =

US-based non-profit organization

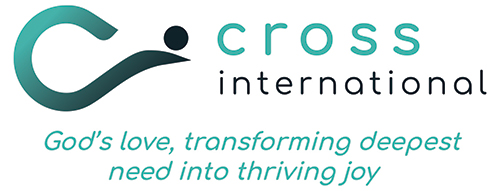
- Founded: 2001
- Type: 501(c)(3) non-profit organization
- Location: Pompano Beach, Florida
- Region served: Over 36 developing countries throughout Latin America, the Caribbean, Africa, and Asia.
- Key people: Kelly Miller, President
- Website: www.crossinternational.org

Cross International is a Christian charity focused on alleviating poverty primarily in Latin America, Africa and the Caribbean. Headquartered in Pompano Beach, Florida, it is a 501(c)(3) organization.

Cross supplies food, water, shelter, medical care, educational support and self-help resources through a network of Christian churches and ministries overseas.

== Countries of operation ==
- Afghanistan
- Belize
- Bolivia
- Democratic Republic of the Congo
- Dominican Republic
- Ecuador
- Ethiopia
- Ghana
- Grenada
- Guatemala
- Guyana
- Haiti
- Honduras
- Kenya
- Malawi
- Nicaragua
- Nigeria
- Peru
- St. Martin
- Trinidad and Tobago
- Uganda
- Zambia
- Zimbabwe
