= Sri Aurobindo International School, Hyderabad =

Location
- Sri Aurobindo Marg, Osmania University Road, 2-2-4/1, Vidyanagar, Near Vidyanagar Railway Bridge, Hyderabad, Telangana, 500044; India

Information
- Established: 1967
- Founder: Prof.V.Madhusudhan Reddy
- Website: http://sriaurobindointernationalschool.org/

Sri Aurobindo International School, Hyderabad is a school located in Hyderabad, Telangana. The main campus is located in Vidyanagar, Osmania University road and its affiliated to ICSE board, it offers education from Nursery to 10+2, their other campus which is located in Jangaon which is around 90 KMS from Uppal(Hyderabad). This Jangaon campus is residential school where class IV to Class IX is offered and its affiliated to CBSE board. The school is well-known for not requiring students to wear uniforms because they value the uniqueness of each child. The school is named in honor of philosopher Sri Aurobindo.

== Prefectorial system ==
Each year, a centralized prefectorial body is set up to ensure proper functioning of the school body. The board consists of the School President and School Captain, with a deputy Vice-Captain to assist. They lead a group of prefects, including high post holders like the school sports secretaries, the house captains and captains of other activities, along with the other prefects. The students of class 10 hold the majority of the posts.

All posts except for the post of the school captain and the school president are elected directly by high school students. Together, the post holders make up the Students' Council.

The school has four houses or sub-groups: Perfection (white), Power (red), Harmony (pink), and Wisdom (yellow). Students are divided into these houses and participate in Inter House competitions.

== Founder ==
The school was founded Prof. V. Madhusudhan Reddy (1925 – 1996). In December 1964, sanctioned and blessed by The Mother, Prof. Reddy established The Institute of Human Study in Hyderabad.

== Facilities ==
The total area of the school is 15000 sq. m. The school has two blocks: the Primary school block, and the High school block. Together these also house the following: the principal's and vice-principal's offices, staff room, assembly courtyard and classrooms, as well as laboratories for computer science and the natural sciences.

== Extracurricular Activities ==
Students have options of extracurricular activities to choose from, such as music (vocal and instrumental), dance, theatre, arts, craft, home science, fashion designing, pottery, and various languages, including German, French and Sanskrit. Basketball, chess, swimming, tennis, karate, and badminton are offered as after-school activities.

The school has a basketball team actively takes part in ICSE meets and other interschool competitions.

== See also ==
- Auroville
- Integral education
- Mirra Alfassa "The Mother"
- Sri Aurobindo
- Sri Aurobindo Ashram
