= Team Expansion =

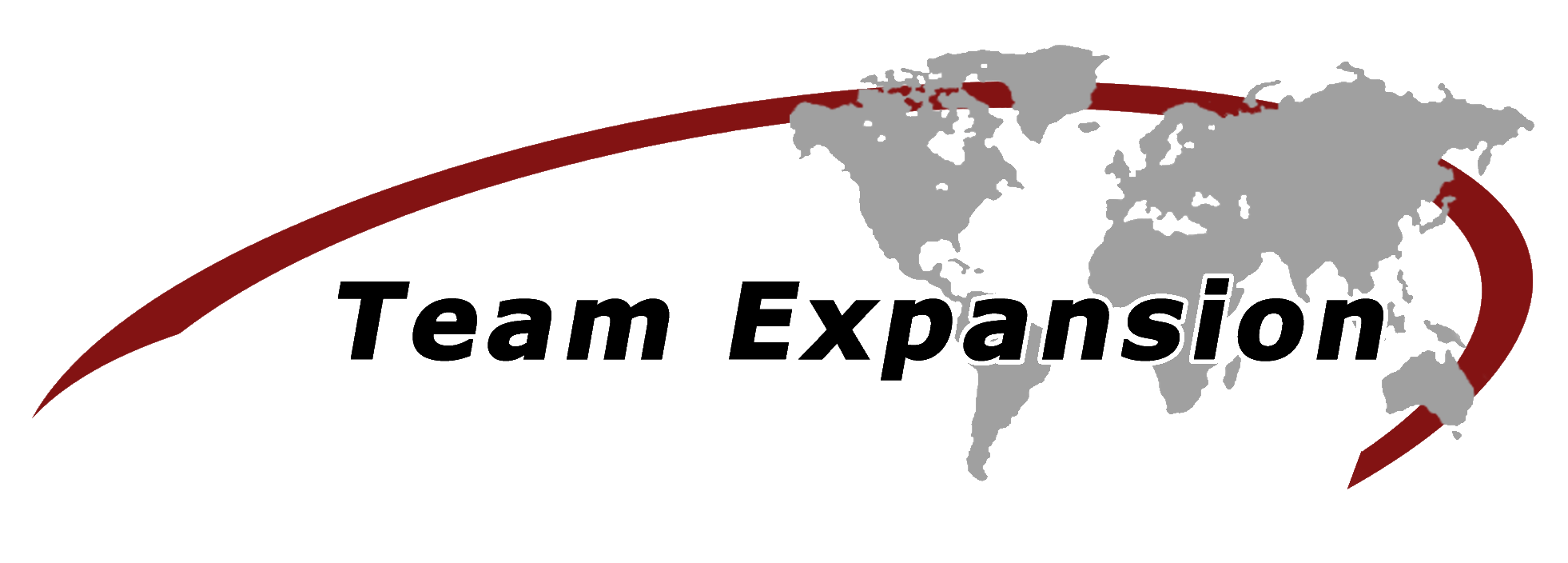
- Founded: 1978
- Founder: Doug & Penny Lucas
- Type: Christian Missions Agency
- Purpose: Church planting, missionary work
- Location: Louisville, Kentucky
- Key people: Doug Lucas
- Website: www.teamexpansion.org

Team Expansion is a non-profit, 501(c)(3) charitable organization that establishes churches around the world in places not well served by the Christian faith. Many Team Expansion workers are associated with the Restoration Movement of churches, but as an agency, Team Expansion is non-denominational.

== History ==
Team Expansion began as a prayer movement on the campus of what was Kentucky Christian University in 1978. In 1982, five missionaries headed to Montevideo, Uruguay to start the very first Team Expansion work. In 1983, International Services – the stateside support team for all international workers – was launched and headquartered first in the basement of Doug and Penny Lucas' home in Covington, then later in the home rented by John and Becky Bliffen in Cincinnati, Ohio and then in 1984 on the campus of Cincinnati Bible College, now known as Cincinnati Christian University.

Between 1985 and 1996, Team Expansion launched multiple new teams, including Venezuela, Ukraine, Ireland, and Tanzania. In 1997, the leadership of Southeast Christian Church invited Team Expansion to move its headquarters to Louisville. In June 1997, there were 120 full-time missionaries working around the world with 22 different people groups. Teams continued to go into some of the most difficult places, including Bosnia and Kosovo.

In 2001, there were 199 full-time missionaries, including three brand new works in Italy, Japan, and Louisville, Kentucky, where the workers are focused on a sizable Hispanic population. By 2002, more than 8,000 people had been baptized and more than 110 churches had been established around the world.

In 2019, Team Expansion reported 6,673 new baptisms and a total attendance of 48,538 around the world. With 20-25% of the reports available for 2020, Team Expansion had seen 5,584 new baptisms, 1,628 new “simple churches,” and 29,892 total average worship attendance.

== Partnerships and projects ==
Team Expansion participates with the International Conference on Missions (formerly National Missionary Convention) especially with the Unleashed for the Unreached exhibit. Several Team Expansion leaders were involved in the decision to create the Restoration Revolution 10-year movement toward missions. Team Expansion participated in Light the Fire, a missional prayer initiative born out of the Restoration Revolution movement.

Team Expansion works extensively with the Kairos Course, a course designed to see the whole Church mobilized for cross-cultural mission to the world's least-reached peoples. Team Expansion also works with the "Jonathan Project," which seeks and trains men and women who have characteristics like the biblical character, Jonathan, as evidenced in 1 Samuel 14. Many people from Team Expansion are using the tools and resources from the Zúme Disciple Making Movement.

== Home office ==
Prayer Center & Atrium at Emerald Hills in Louisville

Emerald Hills is Team Expansion's campus for prayer, retreat and learning. The campus' 61 acres outside of Louisville house Team Expansion's Prayer Center and Atrium facility. Discovery School of the Outdoors (DSOTO), an experiential outdoor learning program, is conducted in the low- and high-ropes course at Emerald Hills. Also staged at Emerald Hills is Brigada Online, a growing collection of web- and email-based resources. Nearly 10,000 individuals have subscribed to the service, which publishes a weekly newsletter, "Brigada Today," as well as a website.
