= Gylfilites' Guild =

Germanic Heathen sect

Founder
- Wolfgang Kantelberg

Regions with significant populations
- Germany

Religions
- Paganism

The Gylfilites' Guild (German: Gylfiliten-Gilde), also known by the adherents' or movement's names the Gylfilites or Gylfilitism, is a Germanic Heathen sect of Ariosophical-Armanic orientation based in Krefeld, North Rhine-Westphalia, which gathered public attention in 1976. The sect published the magazine named Odrörir, the name of the mead of poetry. Since the 1990s the group has gone underground.

== History ==
The Gylfilites were founded in 1976 by Wolfgang Kantelberg, titled Brother Wali (Bruder Wali), as a splinter group of the larger Germanic organisation Goden. Kantelberg was in the years 1960s a member of the National Democratic Party of Germany, which he later abandoned for instead joining the Volkssozialistische Bewegung Deutschlands/Partei der Arbeit. For the Gylfilite group, Kantelberg developed a secret language based on ancient forms of German speech naming it Diutisk (actually an ancient form of Deutsch, "Teutonic").

== Features ==
The Gylfilites are named after the mythical Scandinavian king Gylfi and describe themselves as a religious organisation aligned "according to the teachings of the Eddas". It is a Germanic Neopagan group with Blood and Soil and National Socialist ideas. Adolf Hitler is revered as a saint who prevented a communist world dictatorship, and together with Arminius and the namesake Gylfi he is considered a battle-slain in Valhalla. The community holds an idea of the German people similar to that of nationalist organisations pre-dating 1933. The Judeo-Christian tradition with its monotheism and its egalitarianism is categorically rejected.

== Classification ==
Stefan von Hoyningen-Huene categorises Gylfilitism as a movement influenced by the völkisch movement, Ariosophy and the Deutschglaube (German ethnic religion), combining Germanic beliefs such as the Ragnarök with Buddhist elements. Hugo Stamm assigns Gylfilitism to the neopagan religious milieu.

== Bibliography ==
- Rainer Fromm: Am rechten Rand. Lexikon des Rechtsradikalismus. Schüren Presseverlag, Marburg 1993, ISBN 3-89472-080-8, S. 101 ff.: „Gylfiliten“.

== Documentation ==
- Martin Papirowski, Klaus Schellschmidt: Aus der Serie „Esoterik heute“: Wotans Wiederkehr. Mundus, 1990 (45 min)
