= United Sikhs =

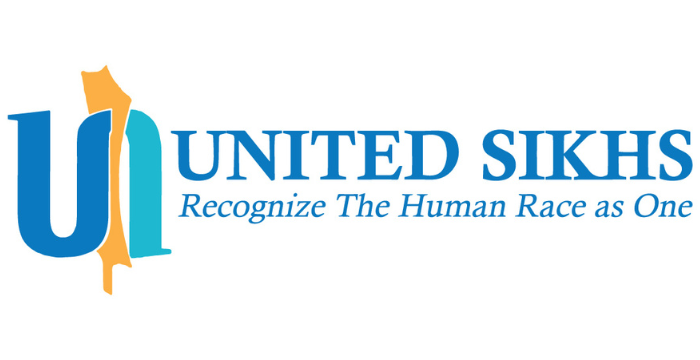
UNITED SIKHS

UNITED SIKHS is a civil and human rights, humanitarian aid non profit organization and disaster relief non-governmental organization which is also a United Nations affiliated group. The concept of UNITED SIKHS was conceived in 1999 by three Sikh Americans. It is international in scope and aims to help people regardless of color, race, gender, nationality or creed.

UNITED SIKHS led a campaign to have U.S. Census Bureau recognize Sikhs as a separate ethnicity, which was successful on January 6, 2020. As a result, Sikhs are regarded as different from Asian Indian category.
