= List of Baptist colleges and universities in the United Kingdom =

This is a list of Baptist colleges and universities in the United Kingdom:

- Bristol Baptist College
- Irish Baptist College
- Northern Baptist College
- North Wales Baptist College
- Regent's Park College, Oxford
- Scottish Baptist College
- South Wales Baptist College
- Spurgeon's Baptist College
