= European Buddhist Union =

Buddhist umbrella organization

- Abbreviation: EBU
- Formation: 1975; 50 years ago
- Founder: Paul Arnold
- Founded at: London, United Kingdom
- Headquarters: Brussels, Belgium
- Website: europeanbuddhism.org

The European Buddhist Union (EBU) is the umbrella organization of Buddhist communities and national Buddhist unions in Europe. The EBU is open to all schools and traditions of Buddhism in Europe wishing to unite on the basis of Buddhist teachings and work together in spiritual friendship and respect for diversity. According to the 'EBU Statement of Mission and Vision' the aims are to facilitate international exchange and promote spiritual friendship amongst European Buddhists, to support social action and ideas motivated by Buddhist values, and to amplify the voice of Buddhism in Europe and worldwide.

== History of the EBU ==
The EBU was founded in London in 1975, at the initiative of Judge Paul Arnold. The first Annual General Meeting (AGM) was held the same year in Paris. Towards the end of the Cold War meetings were held on both sides of the Iron Curtain. At present there are almost 50 member organisations from 16 European countries. Over the years, the EBU got engaged in various European and international organisations.

== Representation of European Buddhists ==
In 2010, there were around 1.8 million Buddhists across Europe, east and west. The only region on the European continent where Buddhism is the majority religion is the Republic of Kalmykia in the European part of the Russian Federation.

Most Buddhist National Unions are member of the EBU. However, Baumann states,

Organizations of Buddhists who have immigrated from Asia (for example, Vietnamese, Cambodian, or Laotian Buddhists) or of Nichiren traditions are not members of the EBU. Thus, the EBU is almost exclusively a representational organization of convert Buddhists, although some migrant Buddhist organizations are affiliated with national unions.

Today the political authorities of most European countries have come to some form of official recognition of Buddhism.

=== Participation in international organisations ===
In 2008 the EBU obtained official participatory status with the Council of Europe in Strasbourg and participates in the Council of Europe's Conference of International Non-Governmental Organisations. In June 2014, Michel Aguilar (representative of the EBU to the Council of Europe) got elected chair of the Human Rights Committee for a three-year term of office. The Human Rights Committee brings together some 160 NGOs. Topics that are currently on the agenda include: the protection of human rights defenders, media and human rights, religion and human rights, children and human rights, the Social Charter, economic and social rights.

The EBU has been a regular partner in dialogue between the European Union and European bodies concerned with religion and belief. The EBU is a founding member of the European Network of Religion and Belief, a network of European confessional and non-confessional organisations who want to combat discrimination and promote mutual understanding in the field of religion and belief, working within the framework of the EU Charter of Fundamental Rights.

The EBU is also a member of the World Fellowship of Buddhists (2000) and the International Buddhist Confederation (2014).

== Current members ==
There are currently 50 organizations affiliated with the EBU.

=== Regional members ===
- Asociación Hispana de Buddhismo (Spain)
- Asociación Nalanda (Spain)
- Benchen Karma Kamtsang Association (Poland)
- Buddhist Mission Hungary – Church of the Arya Maitreya Mandala (Hungary)
- Buddhistische Gemeinschaft Salzburg (Austria)
- Centro Zen L’Arco (Italy)
- Comunidad Budista Soto Zen (Spain)
- Dharmaloka chan budistička zajednica (Croatia)
- Haus Tao (Switzerland)
- Jai-Bhim Network (Hungary)
- Jodo Shinshu Deutschland (Germany)
- Maitreya Foundation Roma (Italy)
- Mandala Milano – Centro Studi Tibetani (Italy)
- Mandala Samten Ling – Centro Studi Tibetani (Italy)
- Monastero Zen Enso-ji IL Cerchio (Italy)
- Reiyukai France (France)
- Rimay (France)
- Sakya Tashi Ling (Spain)
- Sangha Activa – Sakya Thekchog Düde (Spain)
- StoneWater Zen Centre (UK)
- The Gate of the Dharma Ecumenical Buddhist Foundation (Hungary)
- The Order of Buddhist Contemplatives (UK)
- Tibetisches Zentrum Hamburg (Germany)

=== National Union members ===
- Boeddhistische Unie Nederland (BUN) (Netherlands)
- Buddhist Federation of Norway (Norway)
- Buddhist Union of Belgium (BUB-UBB) (Belgium)
- Deutsche Buddhistische Union (DBU) (Germany)
- Federación de Comunidades Budistas de España (FCBE) (Spain)
- Network of Buddhist Organisations – UK (UK)
- Österreichische Buddhistische Religionsgesellschaft (Austria)
- Polish Buddhist Union (Poland)
- Portuguese Buddhist Union (UBP) (Portugal)
- Suomen Buddhalainen Unioni (SBU) (Finland)
- Swedish Buddhist Community (SBC) (Sweden)
- Swiss Buddhist Union (SBU-USB-UBS) (Switzerland)
- Union Bouddhiste de France (UBF) (France)
- Unione Buddhista Italiana (UBI) (Italy)

=== International members ===
- Amida Trust (UK)
- Buddhist Congregation Dharmaling (Slovenia)
- Dechen Buddhist Community (UK)
- Dhagpo Kagyu Ling (France)
- Diamond Way Buddhism – Buddhistischer Dachverband Diamantweg (Germany)
- Dzogchen Community Europe (Italy)
- FPMT Europe (Netherlands)
- RIGPA (France)
- Sakyadhita (France)
- Shambhala Europe (Germany)
- The Triratna Buddhist Order and Community (UK)
- Western Chan Fellowship (UK)
- Yun Hwa Sangha Europe (Germany)

== See also ==
- Buddhism in Europe
- Buddhism in the West
- Buddhism in Kalmykia
