= Deutsche Buddhistische Union =

German Buddhist Union

Deutsche Buddhistische Union ("German Buddhist Union", abbreviation: DBU) is a German national umbrella organisation for Buddhist associations registered in Germany. DBU has estimated that there are 250 000 Buddhists in Europe and the religion is growing. But it is unclear what percentage of Buddhists in Germany are members of the DBU. In contrast to the source above, the Religious Studies Media and Information Service (REMID) cites a total of 300 000 Buddhists in Germany for 2024, many of whom, according to the DBU, are not organized in groups or associations. Hans-Günter Wagner assumes that 5% of German Buddhists are members of the DBU. In particular, only a few Buddhists of Asian origin in Germany are represented in the DBU. As of June 2021 DBU has 62 member organizations.

DBU was founded in 1955 by Buddhists from Berlin, Munich and Hamburg. At first the union was called "German Buddhist Society" (German: Deutsche Buddhistische Gesellschaft).The name was changed in 1958. As of 1981 DBU has been recognized as a non-profit organization. Since 1985, the association has published a magazine, initially called “Lotosblätter” (Lotus Leaves), later renamed “Buddhismus aktuell” (Buddhism Today). In 2008, the "German Buddhist Order Community (DBO)", an association of Buddhist monks and nuns, was founded. The DBO is an association affiliated with the DBU. DBU is a member of the European Buddhist Union. The union is also closely associated with the Network of Buddhist Women in Europe.

For decades, there were heated debates within the DBU about the membership of Ole Nydahl, head of the largest Tibetan Buddhist DBU community, “Diamond Way Buddhism.” Nydahl was repeatedly accused of making racist and islamophobic statements. Criticism of him came from both inside and outside the DBU. As early as 1996, the spokesperson for the DBU's executive board, Regina Leisner, imposed a publication ban on articles written by Nydahl in the association's magazine, a ban on appearances at DBU events, and disapproved of his behavior. Leisner left organized Buddhism at the end of the 1990s. Nevertheless, the Diamond Way Buddhism remained the DBU community with the largest membership. Public criticism was repeatedly voiced regarding the DBU's silence and failure to respond to Nydahl's continued racist and misanthropic statements. It was not until 2018 that the question of expulsion was put on the agenda within the DBU, which the Diamond Way community then preempted by leaving the association. As a result, the DBU lost about one-third of its members.

In addition to the membership of Buddhist communities, it is now also possible to become an individual associate member (without membership rights or contribution obligations).The institution is therefore no longer purely an umbrella organization, as it was when it was founded. According to the current statutes dated June 24, 2023, member communities must consist of at least ten persons.

== Critique of DBU ==
In an article in the magazine “Ursache\Wirkung” (Cause\Effect), religious scholar Hendrik Hortz analyzes a case of sexual abuse at the “Buddhist Meditation and Study Center TTC” in Hamburg, a Tibetan Buddhist member community of the DBU. Among other things, he criticizes the conflicting roles of the DBU's contact point for sexual abuse, represented by Mrs. Dorothea Nett, who was also the second chair of the Karma Kagyu community, to which Lama Dawa, the alleged perpetrator of the abuse, also belongs. Hortz critically notes that the association's ethical code of conduct, which is based solely on voluntary compliance and does not provide for any sanctions against perpetrators and their communities, had no effect in this case. The lama continues to be active in his community as a religious teacher.

== See also ==
- Buddhism in Germany
- European Buddhist Union
