= World Sunni Movement =

Sunni Islamic organization

- বিশ্ব সুন্নী আন্দোলন
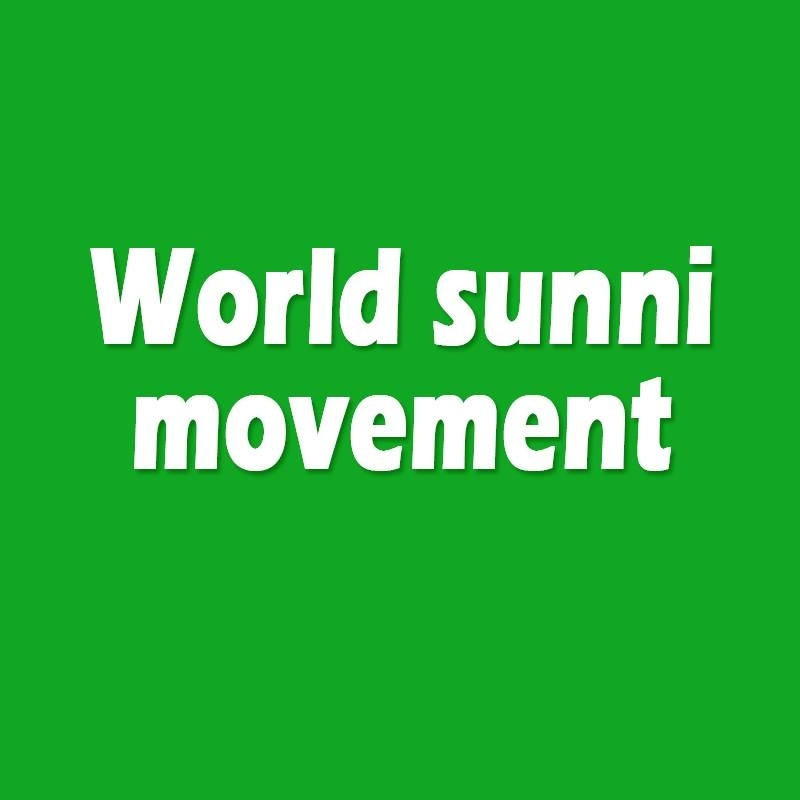
- World Sunni Movement
- Formation: 1979
- Founder: Syed Imam Hayat
- Founded at: Dhaka, Bangladesh
- Type: Sunni Islamic Organization
- Headquarters: Dhaka, Bangladesh
- Chief Advisor: Syed Mohammad Saifur Rahman
- Secretary General: Sheikh Raihan Rahbar

World Sunni Movement (Bengali: বিশ্ব সুন্নী আন্দোলন) is a Sunni Islamic religious organization in Bangladesh. It was founded in 1979 in Bangladesh by Syed Imam Hayat. In addition to Bangladesh, the World Sunni Movement is active in the United States, the United Kingdom, France, Italy, Portugal, Spain, and Greece,

== Calendar ==
=== Eid-e-Azam ===
The organization celebrates Eid-e-Azam or Eid-ul-Milad-Un-Nabi, which means Greatest Joy in Hijri year, the 12th day of Rabi al-Awwal.

=== Eid-e-Meraj-un-nabi ===
According to Islam, in Hijri year, 26th Rajab the Islamic prophet Mohammad directly and physically met with God heavenly which is called Miraj or ascension to heaven. The World Sunni Movement celebrates Eid-e-Merajunnabi on this day

=== Martyr Day ===
10th al-Muharram of Hijri year the organization celebrates The National Martyr Day commemorating the death of Husayn ibn Ali.

=== Dark Day ===
World Sunni Movement celebrates Dark Day on 23 September, the anniversary of the day 1932, Ibn Saud established the Kingdom of Saudi Arabia. The royal House of Saud demolished most of the old the Islamic heritage such as mosques, Jannat al-Baqi, Jannat al-Mu'alla, the tomb of companions of Muhammad, etc.

They condemned and protested terrorist attacks including the 2017 London bridge attack, November 2015 Paris attacks, and the 2019 Sri Lanka Easter bombings. They also protest perceived offenses against their religious feelings.

== See also ==
- Isra and Mi'raj
