= Formylmethanofuran—tetrahydromethanopterin N-formyltransferase =

formylmethanofuran-tetrahydromethanopterin N-formyltransferase
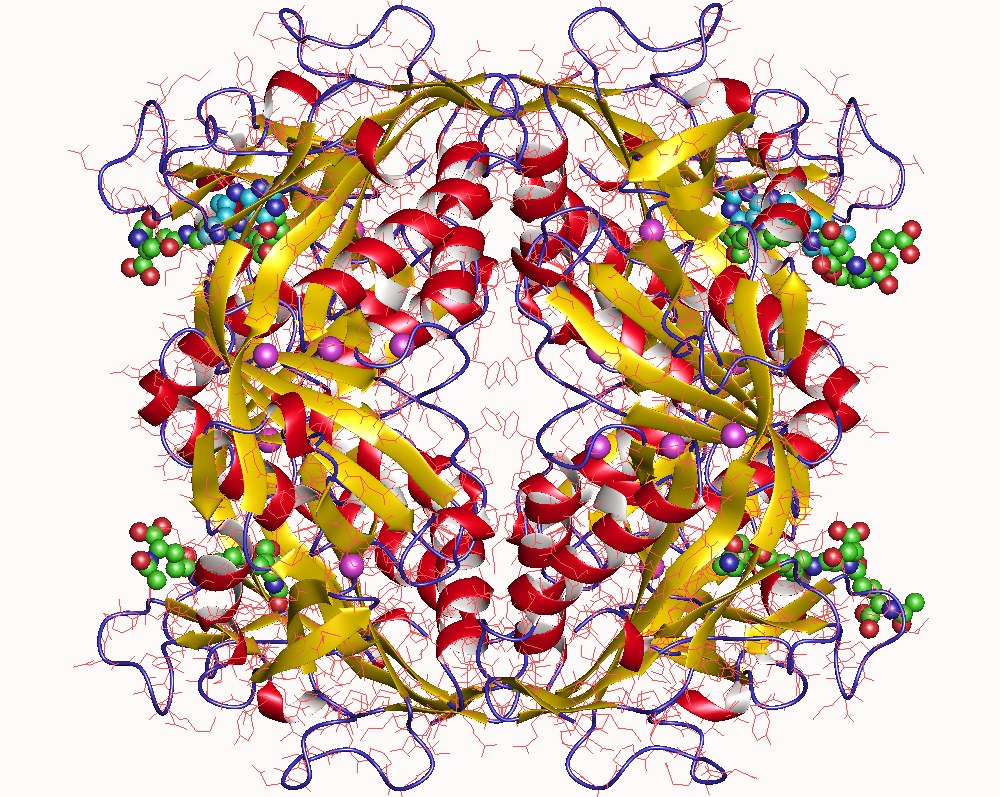
- formylmethanofuran-THMPT-formyltransferase tetramer, Methanopyrus kandleri

Identifiers
- EC no.: 2.3.1.101
- CAS no.: 105669-83-8

Databases
- BRENDA: enzyme data
- ExPASy: NiceZyme view
- KEGG: enzyme entry
- MetaCyc: metabolic pathway
- Rhea: reactions
- PDB structures: RCSB PDB PDBe PDBsum
- Gene Ontology: AmiGO / QuickGO
Search
- PMC: articles
- PubMed: articles
- NCBI: proteins

FTR
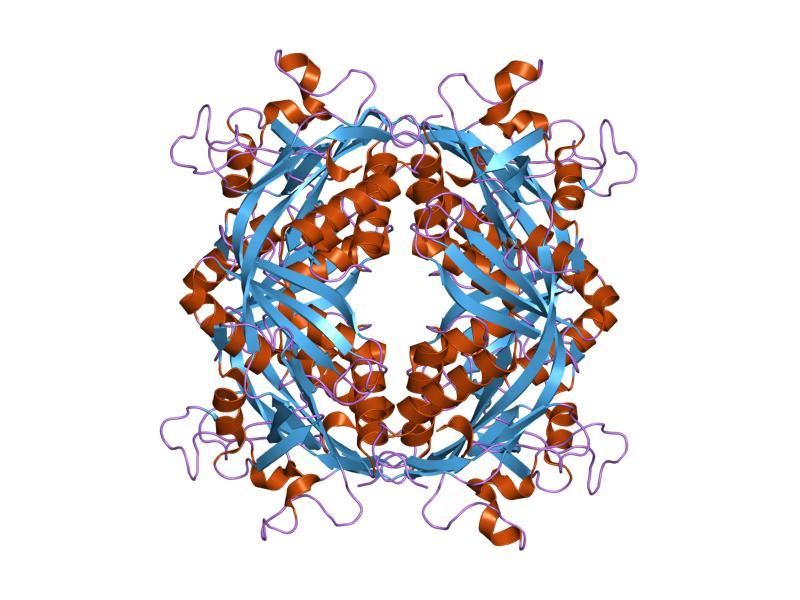
- formylmethanofuran:tetrahydromethanopterin fromyltransferase from methanosarcina barkeri

Identifiers
- Symbol: FTR
- Pfam: PF01913
- InterPro: IPR022667
- SCOP2: 1ftr / SCOPe / SUPFAM
- TCDB: 9.A.17
Available protein structures:
- PDB: IPR022667 PF01913 (ECOD; PDBsum)
- AlphaFold: IPR022667; PF01913

FTR, proximal lobe
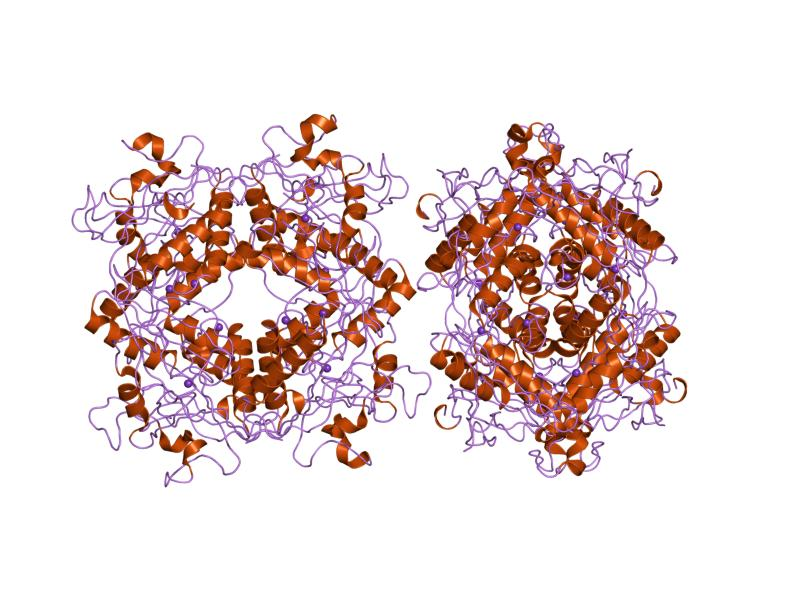
- formylmethanofuran:tetrahydromethanopterin formyltransferase from archaeoglobus fulgidus

Identifiers
- Symbol: FTR_C
- Pfam: PF02741
- InterPro: IPR002770
- SCOP2: 1ftr / SCOPe / SUPFAM
Available protein structures:
- PDB: IPR002770 PF02741 (ECOD; PDBsum)
- AlphaFold: IPR002770; PF02741

In enzymology, a formylmethanofuran-tetrahydromethanopterin N-formyltransferase (EC 2.3.1.101) is an enzyme that catalyzes the chemical reaction

formylmethanofuran + 5,6,7,8-tetrahydromethanopterin $\rightleftharpoons$ methanofuran + 5-formyl-5,6,7,8-tetrahydromethanopterin

Thus, the two substrates of this enzyme are formylmethanofuran and 5,6,7,8-tetrahydromethanopterin, whereas its two products are methanofuran and 5-formyl-5,6,7,8-tetrahydromethanopterin.

This enzyme belongs to the family of transferases, specifically those acyltransferases transferring groups other than aminoacyl groups. The systematic name of this enzyme class is formylmethanofuran:5,6,7,8-tetrahydromethanopterin 5-formyltransferase. Other names in common use include formylmethanofuran-tetrahydromethanopterin formyltransferase, formylmethanofuran:tetrahydromethanopterin formyltransferase, N-formylmethanofuran(CHO-MFR):tetrahydromethanopterin(H4MPT), formyltransferase, FTR, formylmethanofuran:5,6,7,8-tetrahydromethanopterin, and N5-formyltransferase. This enzyme participates in folate biosynthesis.

Ftr from the thermophilic methanogen Methanopyrus kandleri (which has an optimum growth temperature 98 degrees C) is a hyperthermophilic enzyme that is absolutely dependent on the presence of lyotropic salts for activity and thermostability. The crystal structure of Ftr, determined to a reveals a homotetramer composed essentially of two dimers. Each subunit is subdivided into two tightly associated lobes both consisting of a predominantly antiparallel beta sheet flanked by alpha helices forming an alpha/beta sandwich structure. The approximate location of the active site was detected in a region close to the dimer interface. Ftr from the mesophilic methanogen Methanosarcina barkeri and the sulphate-reducing archaeon Archaeoglobus fulgidus have a similar structure.

In the methylotrophic bacterium Methylobacterium extorquens, Ftr interacts with three other polypeptides to form an Ftr/hydrolase complex which catalyses the hydrolysis of formyl-tetrahydromethanopterin to formate during growth on C1 substrates.

== Structural studies ==
As of late 2007, 5 structures have been solved for this class of enzymes, with PDB accession codes PDB: 1FTR, PDB: 1M5H, PDB: 1M5S, PDB: 2FHJ, and PDB: 2FHK.
