= Family Tracing and Reunification =

Disaster response process

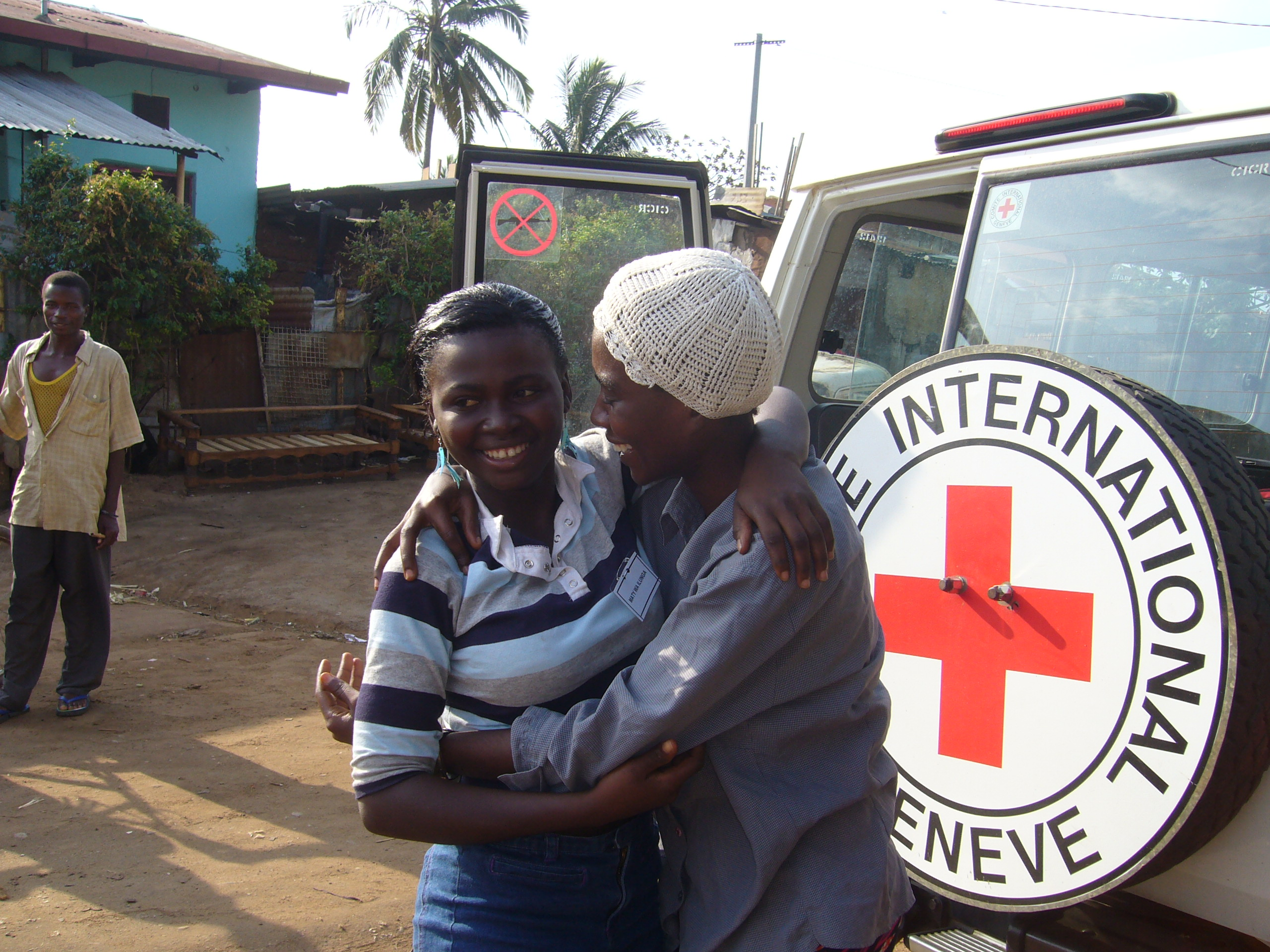
International NGOs work to reunite separated family members

Family Tracing and Reunification (known as FTR) is a process whereby disaster response teams locate separated family members and reunite them following natural and human catastrophes. During major crises, children can become separated from their families for a wide range of reasons, and government disaster relief agencies as well as NGOs have developed inter-agency procedures to return children, and other vulnerable people, to their families.

== Mobile technology ==
UNICEF has developed a tool called RapidFTR that uses smartphones to register and monitor children who have become separated during a natural disaster or conflict, with a view to reunifying children with their parents. While the tool has been assessed as having some benefits, it has reportedly encountered significant challenges relating to relevance of the design and heavy dependence on internet in contexts with limited access. The RapidFTR platform showed some promise and was used to track displaced children after Typhoon Haiyan in the Philippines, but has been phased out in the more sizable South Sudan response in favour of more contextually suitable methods of registering separated families and managing related data.

== See also ==
- Restoring Family Links
