= Network of Buddhist Organisations =

British ecumenical body

The Network of Buddhist Organisations is a British ecumenical body founded in 1993.

== Development ==
The Network of Buddhist Organisations was formed at a time when Buddhism had become consolidated in Britain, with a membership scattered over a large number of different bodies. They varied from traditional interpretations of the teaching dependent on Eastern monastics to popular and influential groups classified as New Religious Movements. The NBO's stated intent was to promote greater openness to dialogue and increased co-operation between the many different Buddhist organisations.

As its policy met with success, the Network also turned its attention to dialogue and co-operation with other faiths and to taking part in consultation with government and other public bodies, including the Charity Commission and the Equality and Human Rights Commission. Nationally, it plays an active role in the work of the Religious Education Council, the Inter Faith Network UK and internationally in the European Buddhist Union.

Another aspect of NBO's work has been the series of conferences and events it has helped organise on topics centred upon the application of Buddhist teaching to the modern world. Noteworthy among these have been the UK-wide Buddhist arts festival, "A Lotus in Flower", in 2005; the 2006 conference, "The Dharma Revolution: 50 Years On", on Ambedkarite (Indian) Buddhism; the 2007 Eco-Dharma conference held in Birmingham; the 2008 "British Buddhist Landscape" conference held at Taplow Court, covering many aspects of Buddhist social practice and experience in Britain; and the 2009 arts conference, "Buddha Mind, Creative Mind", also held at Taplow Court. The last of these resulted in the formation of the Dharma Arts group, an association of Buddhist artists. Again in Birmingham, a day seminar for Buddhists working with schools was organised by Clear Vision Trust in association with NBO as part of Celebrating RE month in March 2011.

During the run-up to the 2011 census, the NBO, in common with many other organisations, ran a public campaign for adherents to identify themselves in the box indicating religious affiliation in order to gain enhanced official recognition. In 2012 the Network co-ordinated the Buddhist contribution to the Government's multi-faith initiative, A Year of Service. This involved a day of action on July 3 with care for the environment as its focus, and was publicised under the name Earthkind. The response was so positive that subsequently it was decided to hold an annual Buddhist Action Month each June (BAM) with participating organisations choosing their own theme.

== Criticism ==
The Network's openness to dialogue with groups that some orthodox Buddhists regard as controversial has brought it a certain amount of criticism. Although veteran author Ken Jones has praised NBO for its work, he sees certain dangers for it as well: "The Network of Buddhist Organisations is performing an invaluable role in opening up dialogue and bringing potential antagonists together in common concerns. Much useful communication takes place off the record, though the Network remains vulnerable to sectarianism."

The risk of sectarianism of which he speaks came to the fore in 1998, when the New Kadampa Tradition applied for membership not long after its members had been involved in demonstrations against the Dalai Lama concerning the Dorje Shugden controversy. Several NBO members considered the conduct of the NKT incongruous with the Network's aims. When the NKT's application was accepted, some groups therefore left the NBO including approximately 30% of its Tibetan Buddhist members.

The NBO posted a document on their website in response to the relevant Parliamentary Questions that referred to it.

== Code of conduct ==
In early 2009, the NBO launched a code of conduct for its members. The code had previously been publicised and discussed by the membership in 2008. The NBO code is based upon the five Buddhist Precepts which members are asked to affirm their support for and to undertake that their members would not "defame other Buddhist organisations or teachers in public or via the media," and that every effort should be made to resolve any disagreements within organisations, or with other organisations or groups, "through internal processes or through private discussion and mediation."

== Members ==
=== Voting members ===
- FPMT UK
- SGI UK
- Triratna Buddhist Order & Community
- Order of Buddhist Contemplatives
- Western Chan Fellowship
- Amida Trust
- Jamyang Buddhist Centre Leeds
- Buddhist Healthcare Chaplaincy Group
- Lumbini Nepalese Buddha Dharma Society (UK)

=== Associate members ===
- London Shambhala Centre
- Sangha House
- La Verita Studios Ltd
- Buddhist Group of Kendal
- Wild Goose Zen Sangha
- I.B.P.S. UK (Fo Guan Shan)
- Stonewater Zen Sangha
- The Shrimila Trust (Awakened Heart)
- Zenways
- Open Heart
- Satipanya Buddhist Trust
