= Foundation for Traditional Religions =

The Foundation for Traditional Religions (acronym: FTR; in Russian: Фонд Традиционных Религий, ФТР) is an organisation for the protection and promotion of "traditional religions" in Russia, namely Rodnovery (Slavic Native Faith), other modern Paganisms, and Siberian shamanisms. It was founded in 2019 by Evgeny Alekseyevich Nechkasov, leader of the Siberian Heathen community Svarte Aske. The Foundation ceased operations in March 2022, as new media laws in Russia made it impossible and unsafe for the FTR to continue operating in the country.

== Red Feed ==
The FTR runs the "Red Feed" (Красная лента), a monitor registering cases of persecution, attacks on, conflicts with Rodnovers, other Pagans, and adherents of indigenous religions in Russia, as well as acts of vandalism against their altars, shrines and temples. The Red Feed also tracks "unlawful anti-extremist measures or cases involving unqualified and biased experts" and "defamatory publications and statements which fall under Articles 282 and 148 of the Criminal Code of the Russian Federation" often used against Paganism and indigenous religions by agencies of the Russian Orthodox Church.

== Personae non gratae ==
The FTR supports only "traditionalist Paganisms" and "indigenous religions", and it rejects as personae non gratae a variety of doctrines and authors that it regards as untraditional, including Anastasianism, Sylenkoism, Ynglism-Levashovism and other currents within Slavic Rodnovery; Ariosophy-Armanism, Rökkatru-Thursatru-Lokianism and other currents within Germanic Heathenism; Wicca and Thelema; and Satanism.

== See also ==
- Rodnovery
- Modern Paganism
- Siberian shamanism and Tengrism
