= Islamic International Foundation of Cooperation =

Islamic organization of Iran

IslamIFC
- Founded: 1990
- Founder: H. R. Matin
- Type: Non-profit and NGO
- Headquarters: Qom, Iran
- Region served: Worldwide
- Website: www.islamifc.org

The Islamic International Foundation of Cooperation (IslamIFC) is a nonprofit, non-governmental organization that partners with North American Muslims, non-Muslims and organizations. It promotes peace, mutual understanding and cultural exchange. This organization supports business ventures in order to finance cultural and educational activities. The IslamIFC is the parent organization that includes the OnlineIslamicStudies.com, Al-Mahdi Program, SalaamBooks, ElmeMonir.com, Risaalaat.org, and the 21st February Books. This organization was established in 1990 by some experts in Islamic Studies in the Iranian city of Qom.

== Educational and cultural programs ==
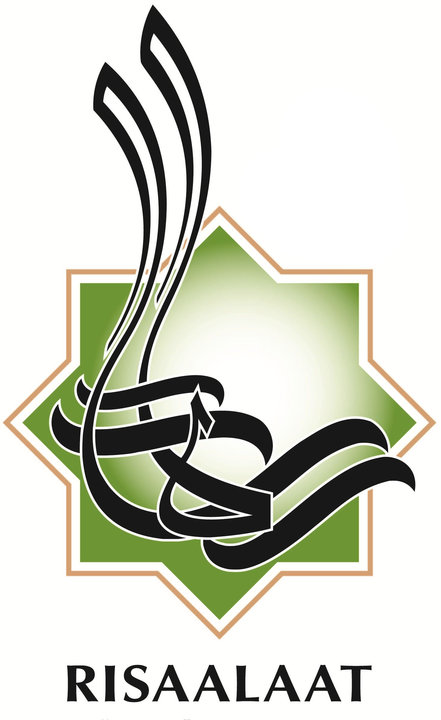
Logo of Risaalaat Educational & Cultural Programs

In 1998, while a student at Hawza Ilmiyah seminary in Qom, Hashim Ali Alauddeen a University of California at Berkeley, graduate in Islamic Studies along with Hujjatul Islam Hamid Matin Maneesh helped IslamIFC to establish its international wing: Al-Mahdi Program (Al-Mahdi Camp) and Risaalaat Educational Program to help Muslims of North America learn Islam, establish cultural exchange and make ziyarat "visitation" to the shrines of the eighth Imam Ali al-Rida, in Mashad, Fatima Masoomeh in Qom. He also taught Islamic studies to the groups and arrange for them to meet with Islamic scholars and encourage them take to take short-term of Islamic courses in Qom.

== Online Islamic Studies Services ==
In 2013, IslamIFC established the OnlineIslamicStudies as an information and education network that provides an online outlet for the production and publishing of the Islamic thoughts and ideas. Members and Students can listen to podcasts, read texts, and make suggestions for adding new information. The network is designed to encourage users to participate in an interactive learning through discussion, blogging, Q&A, and other educational services. OnlineIslamicStudies.com (OIS.Education) is an educational website based on IOSIE (Integrated Online Services for Information Exchange and Education) as a learning management system (LMS), started in 2007 by IslamIFC.

In 2016, IslamIFC launched ElmeMoninr.com as the Persian version of OnlineIslamicStudies.

== Publications ==
Since 2004, IslamIFC has been managing a cooperative effort between writers, translators, editors and Islamic scholars, and has published a series of books on Islamic subjects for children and some books on Irfaan.
