= Berkeley Psychic Institute =

American religious school (1973-)

The Berkeley Psychic Institute (BPI) is a school for spiritual development, founded in 1973 by Lewis S. Bostwick in Berkeley, California and is also the workshop of the seminary of the Church of the Divine Man. The institute claims to have taught thousands of people to read auras and study channeling, one of the most popular classes being The Clairvoyant Training Program. The institute has contributed progressive ideas to the interfaith movement and has also contributed to a growth in number of enlightenment schools and metaphysical institutions. After Lewis' death in 1995, his wife, Vr. Rt. Rev Dr. Susan Hull Bostwick, assumed leadership of the institute and the church. After she retired, VRR DawnRose Thistlethwaite became the current leader of the institute and the church.

There are three Berkeley Psychic Institutes in Northern California, one location in Tokyo, Japan, as well as several other groups throughout the world begun by former students. It has also spawned the Déjà Vu Publishing Company, responsible for the production of the Psychic Reader Magazine, as well as special events, psychic entertainment and spiritual tours.

Rev. Rani August has served as Director of the Berkeley Psychic Institute's flagship location in Berkeley, California, since 2021.

Rev. Robyn Slavich serves as Director of the Berkeley Psychic Institute in Sacramento, California.

Rev. Dominic serves as Director of the Berkeley Psychic Institute in Santa Rosa, California.

Rev. Daiki serves as Director of the Berkeley Psychic Institute in Tokyo, Japan.

== Notable members ==
- Patrick McAnaney author of Dear Psychic
- Helen Palmer, author of Enneagram of Personality-related books
- Jose Stevens, author of The Michael Teachings-related books

== Affiliations ==
- Church of Divine Man
- Psychic Reader Magazine
- Déjà Vu Publishing Company
