= Union Bouddhiste de France =

- Formation: 28 June 1986
- Founder: Jacques Martin Vaskou
- Headquarters: Grande Pagode; Route de la Ceinture du Lac Daumesnil; 75012 Paris
- Members: 98 member organisations
- Official language: French
- Affiliations: EBU
- Website: https://www.bouddhisme-france.org

Union Bouddhiste de France ("Buddhist Union of France", abbreviation: UBF) is the national umbrella organisation for French Buddhist organisations. It is the representative of the French Buddhists (estimated to be 400 000 in 2008) to the officially secular French republic.

The union was founded in 1986 by Jacques Martin Vaskou. As of September 2021 the union consists of 98 member organisations that operate in the Metropolitan France.

The union is a member of the European Buddhist Union.
