= Religious organization =

Organization that supports the practice of a religion

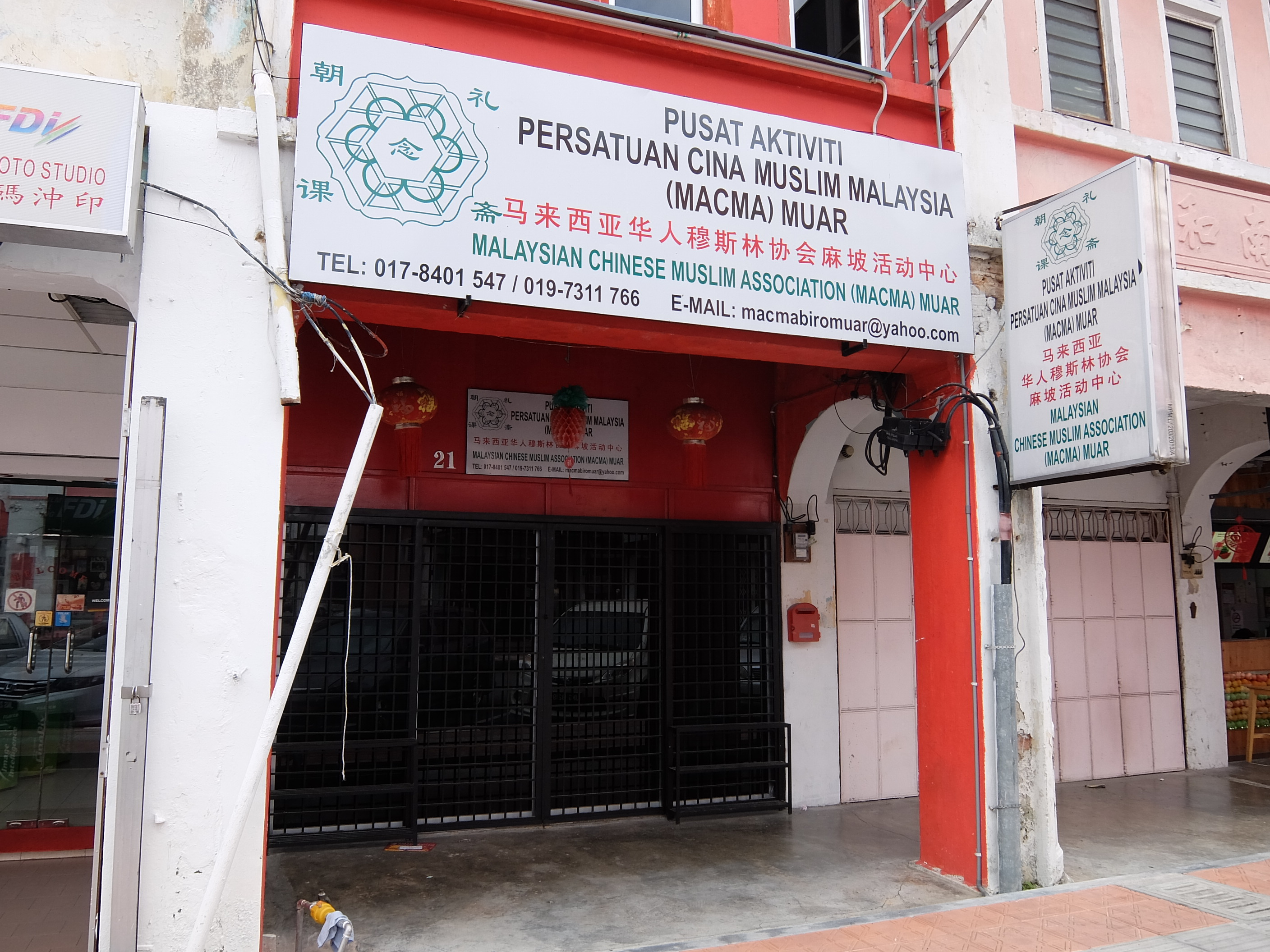
An Islamic religious organization in Johor, Malaysia.

Religious activities generally need some infrastructure to be conducted. For this reason, there generally exist religion-supporting organizations, which are some form of organization that manages:

- the upkeep of places of worship, such as mosques, churches, temples, synagogues, chapels and other buildings or meeting places.
- the payment of salaries to religious leaders, such as Roman Catholic priests, Hindu priests, Protestant ministers, imams and rabbis.

In addition, such organizations usually have other responsibilities, such as the formation, nomination or appointment of religious leaders, the establishment of a corpus of doctrine, the disciplining of leaders and followers with respect to religious law, and the determination of qualification for membership.

== Legal status ==
=== Public organizations ===
Some countries run the activities of one or more religions as part of their government, or as external organizations closely supported by the government. See state religion.

=== Private organizations ===
In some countries, the government is prohibited by law from establishing or supporting religions by separation of church and state, though there may be exceptions to such rules. Religions are thus necessarily supported by private organizations, generally funded by those who attend their services.

==== France ====
The French Republic is constitutionally laïque (roughly, secular). It is prohibited by a 1905 statute for the state to subsidize or recognize any religion, or to pay stipends; for historical reasons, this statute does not apply to the Alsace-Moselle area (where four religions are state-subsidized under the local law), to French Guiana (Catholic priests are employed by the local government, although this situation is likely to change) and to military chaplains (as of 2005, there are indications that the statute of religious services to the military will be changed).

Religious organizations are not required to register, but may if they wish to apply for tax-exempt status or to gain official recognition. The French government defines two categories under which religious groups may register: associations cultuelles (associations of worship, which are exempt from taxes) and associations culturelles (cultural associations, which are not exempt from all taxes). Associations in these two categories are subject to certain management and financial disclosure requirements. An association of worship may organize only religious activities, defined as liturgical services and practices. A cultural association may engage in a profit-making activity. Although a cultural association is not exempt from taxes, it may receive government subsidies for its cultural and educational operations, such as schools. Religious groups normally register under both of these categories; the Mormons, for example, run strictly religious activities through their association of worship and operate a school under their cultural association.

Under the 1905 statute, religious groups must apply with the local prefecture to be recognized as an association of worship and receive tax-exempt status. The prefecture reviews the submitted documentation regarding the association's purpose for existence. To qualify, the group's purpose must be solely the practice of some form of religious ritual. Printing publications, employing a board president, or running a school may disqualify a group from receiving tax-exempt status. A common method is to run such activities in another financially separate association ("cultural association" or other similar denomination).

According to the 1905 law, associations of worship are not taxed on the donations that they receive. However, the prefecture may decide to review a group's status if the association receives a large donation or legacy that comes to the attention of the tax authorities. If the prefecture determines that the association is not in fact in conformity with the 1905 law, its status may be changed, and it may be required to pay taxes at a rate of 60 per cent on present and past donations.

According to the 100 Catholic associations that are tax-exempt; a representative of the Ministry of Interior reports that the number of non-tax-exempt Catholic associations is too numerous to estimate accurately. More than 50 associations of the Jehovah's Witnesses have tax-free status.

==== United States ====
In the United States, a faith-based organization (FBO) is an organization that has its mission based on a faith system. The U.S. IRS designates tax exemptions for those legal entities that qualify. To be a legal entity in America each organization must file the required documents in the U.S. states in which they operate.

=== Croatia ===
The legal status of religious organizations (religious communities in Croatia) is determined by the Law on the Legal Status of Religious Communities. The Ministry of Justice and Administration keeps records in which all religious communities in Croatia are registered.

In Croatia, religious communities are non-profit legal entities. The Croatian government established the Commission for Relations with Religious Communities in order to regulate legal relations between the state and religious organizations.

In Croatia, religious communities have the right to establish religious schools and preschool education institutions, and in accordance with the contract between the religious community and the Government of the Republic of Croatia.

Religious communities have the right to organize religious education classes in public primary and secondary schools, in accordance with the contract between the religious community and the Government of the Republic of Croatia and at the request of the student's parents.

Every religious community has the right to pastoral care of their believers who are in health and social welfare institutions, as well as in penitentiaries and prisons, in accordance with the contract between the religious community and the Government of the Republic of Croatia.

Religious communities can acquire funds through income from their property, from the profits of commercial companies, by providing religious services, by inheritance and by gifts, from voluntary contributions, through charitable, educational and other generally useful activities.

Religious communities in Croatia can receive funds from the state and local budgets under special conditions, depending on their contribution to the national culture and in accordance with the generally beneficial activities of the religious community.

In Croatia, religious communities do not pay tax on real estate transactions, and tax on contributions made by citizens. Also, religious communities do not pay customs duties and taxes on items they receive from foreign religious communities.

The basic conditions for registering a new religious community in Croatia are that the religious community has at least 500 believers and proof that the newly founded religious community has existed as an association for at least 5 years before submitting the application.

== See also ==
- Faith-based organization
- List of religious organizations

== Sources ==
- International Religious Freedom Report 2004, US Department of State
