= Hindu denominations =

Hindu denominations, sampradayas, traditions, movements, and sects are traditions and sub-traditions within Hinduism centered on one or more gods or goddesses, such as Vishnu, Shiva, Shakti, and so on. The term sampradaya (Sanskrit: सम्प्रदाय, IAST: sampradāya) is used for branches with a particular founder-guru with a particular philosophy.

Hinduism has no central doctrinal authority, and many practising Hindus do not claim to belong to any particular denomination or tradition. Four major traditions are, however, used in scholarly studies: Vaishnavism, Shaivism, Shaktism and Smartism. These are sometimes referred to as the denominations of Hinduism, and they differ in the primary deity at the centre of each tradition.

A notable feature of Hindu denominations is that they do not deny other concepts of the divine or deity, and often celebrate the other as henotheistic equivalents. The denominations of Hinduism, states Julius Lipner, are unlike those found in major religions of the world, because Hindu denominations are fuzzy, with individuals practising more than one, and he suggests the term "Hindu polycentrism".

Although Hinduism contains many denominations and philosophies, it is linked by shared concepts, recognisable rituals, cosmology, shared textual resources, pilgrimage to sacred sites and the questioning of authority.

== Etymology ==
The word Hindu is an exonym. This word Hindu is derived from the Indo-Aryan and Sanskrit word Sindhu, which means "a large body of water", covering "river, ocean". It was used as the name of the Indus River and also referred to its tributaries. The actual term 'Hindu' first occurs, states Gavin Flood, as "a Persian geographical term for the people who lived beyond the river Indus (Sanskrit: Sindhu)". Hindus are persons who regard themselves as culturally, ethnically, or religiously adhering to aspects of Hinduism. Historically, the term has also been used as a geographical, cultural, and later religious identifier for people living in the Indian subcontinent. In the 18th century, European merchants and colonists began to refer to the followers of Indian religions collectively as Hindus until about the mid-20th century. Hindus subscribe to a diversity of ideas on spirituality and traditions, but have no ecclesiastical order, no unquestionable religious authorities, no governing body, no prophet(s), nor any binding holy book; Hindus can choose to be polytheistic, pantheistic, monotheistic, monistic, agnostic, atheistic or humanist.

== Overview of Denominations ==
Hinduism, as it is commonly known, can be subdivided into a number of major currents. Of the historical division into six darsanas (philosophies), two schools, Vedanta and Yoga, are currently the most prominent. Classified by primary deity or deities, four major modern Hindu currents are Vaishnavism (Vishnu), Shaivism (Shiva), Shaktism (Shakti) and Smartism (five deities treated as the same). These deity-centered denominations feature a synthesis of various philosophies such as Samkhya, Yoga and Vedanta, as well as shared spiritual concepts such as moksha, dharma, karma, samsara, ethical precepts such as ahimsa, texts (Upanishads, Puranas, Mahabharata, Agamas), ritual grammar, and rites of passage.

=== Six generic types (McDaniel) ===
June McDaniel's analysis of emotion (2007) distinguishes six generic types of Hinduism, among many minor ones, in an attempt to accommodate a variety of views on a rather complex subject:

- Folk Hinduism, based on local traditions and cults of local deities and extending back to prehistoric times, or at least prior to written Vedas.
- Shrauta or "Vedic" Hinduism as practised by traditionalist brahmins (Shrautins).
- Vedantic Hinduism, including Advaita Vedanta (Smartism), based on the philosophical approach of the Upanishads.
- Yogic Hinduism, especially the sect based on the Yoga Sutras of Patanjali.
- "Dharmic" Hinduism or "daily morality", based on karma and upon societal norms such as vivāha (Hindu marriage customs).
- Bhakti or devotional Hinduism, which involves worship of deities.

=== Sampradaya ===
In Hinduism, a sampradaya (Sanskrit: सम्प्रदाय, IAST: sampradāya) (Note: Quoted in Böhtlingk's Sanskrit-Sanskrit dictionary, entry Sampradaya.) is a denomination. These are teaching traditions with autonomous practices and monastic centers, with a guru lineage, with ideas developed and transmitted, redefined and reviewed by each successive generation of followers. A particular guru lineage is called parampara. By receiving diksha (initiation) into the parampara of a living guru, one belongs to its proper sampradaya.

== Number of adherents ==
Demographics of major traditions within Hinduism (World Religion Database, As of 2020)
Tradition	Followers
Vaishnavism	399,526,000
Shaivism	385,423,000
Shaktism	305,643,000
Neo-Hinduism	20,300,000
Reform Hinduism	5,200,000
Cumulative	1,116,092,000

There are no census data available on demographic history or trends for the traditions within Hinduism.

Estimates vary on the relative number of adherents in the different traditions of Hinduism. According to a 2020 estimate by The World Religion Database (WRD), hosted at Boston University’s Institute on Culture, Religion and World Affairs (CURA), the Vaishnavism tradition is the largest group with about 399 million Hindus, followed by Shaivism with 385 million Hindus, Shaktism with 305 million Hindus and other traditions including Neo-Hinduism and Reform Hinduism with 25 million Hindus. In contrast, according to Jones and Ryan, Shaivism is the largest tradition of Hinduism.

Shaivism and Shaktism traditions are difficult to separate, as many Shaiva Hindus revere the goddess Shakti regularly. The denominations of Hinduism, states Julius J. Lipner, are unlike those found in major religions of the world, because Hindu denominations are fuzzy with individuals revering gods and goddesses polycentrically, with many Shaiva and Vaishnava adherents recognizing Sri (Lakshmi), Parvati, Saraswati, and other aspects of the goddess Devi. Similarly, Shakta Hindus revere Shiva and goddesses such as Parvati (such as Durga, Radha, Sita, and others) and Saraswati, who are important in Shaiva and Vaishnava traditions.

== Main denominations ==
=== Vaishnavism ===
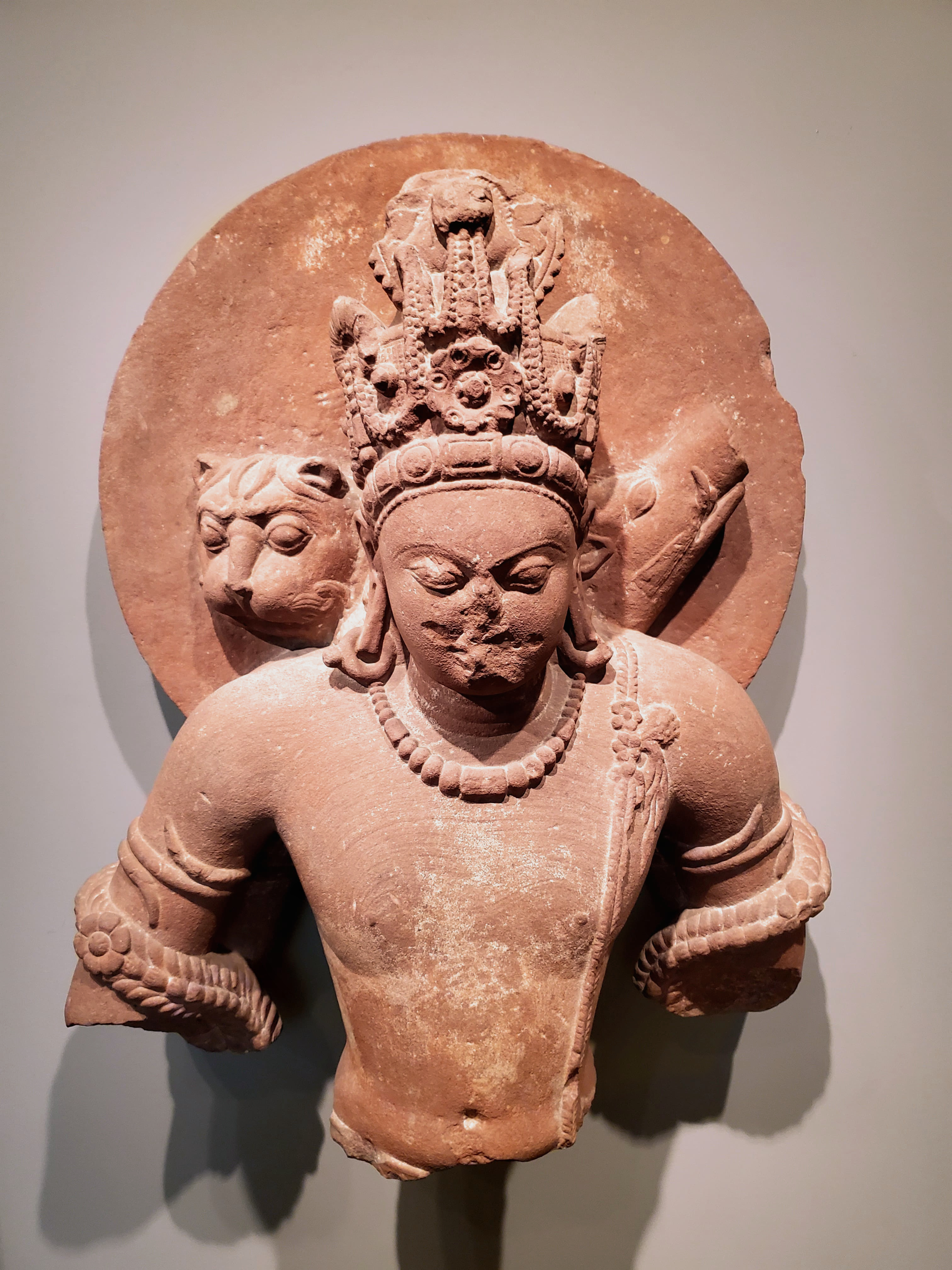
Vaishnavism focuses on Vishnu or one of his avatars, such as his form as a human, lion, or boar.

Vaishnavism is a devotional stream of Hinduism that worships the god Vishnu as the Supreme Lord (Svayam Bhagavan). In addition to Vishnu, adherents worship Vishnu's ten incarnations (i.e., the Dashavatara). The two most-worshipped incarnations of Vishnu are Krishna—especially within Krishnaism—and Rama, whose stories are told in the Mahabharata and the Ramayana, respectively. The adherents of Vaishnavism are generally non-ascetic, monastic, and devoted to meditative practice and ecstatic chanting. Vaishnavism is characterised by diverse adherence to a number of saints, temples, and scriptures. Among historical Vishnuism are the Bhagavata, Pancharatra, and Vaikhanasa traditions.

The major extant Vaishnava sampradayas include:

- Sri Vaishnavism, which is associated with the worship of the divine couple Lakshmi Narayana. Adherents of the tradition subscribe to the philosophy of Vishishtadvaita. Its principal acharyas are Ramanujacharya and Vedanta Desikan.
  - Vadakalai (a.k.a. "the northern school"), which is based on the teachings of Vedanta Desikan.
  - Tenkalai (a.k.a. "the southern school"), which is based on the teachings of Manavala Mamunigal. The Alvars, the Tamil poet-saints of the Bhakti movement, belonged to and are revered in this tradition.
- Ramanandi Sampradaya (a.k.a. the Ramayat Sampradaya or the Ramavat Sampradaya), which adheres to the teachings of the Advaita scholar Ramananda. It is the largest monastic group within Hinduism and in Asia, with Vaishnava monks known as Ramanandis, Vairagis or Bairagis.
- Brahma Sampradaya, which adheres to the teachings of Dvaita Vedanta philosopher Madhvacharya. The term "Brahma" (not to be confused with Brahma, the deity) refers to the Supreme Being (i.e., Vishnu), who is revered as the Para Brahman. Its contemporary forms are Haridasa and Sadh Vaishnavism.
- Gaudiya Vaishnavism (a.k.a. Chaitanya Sampradaya), which adheres to the teachings of Chaitanya Mahaprabhu and has a number of branches:
  - Brahmanic traditional lineages
    - Sri Caitanya Prema Samsthana
  - Gaudiya Math reform lineages
    - Gaudiya Mission
    - Gaudiya Vedanta Samiti
    - International Society for Krishna Consciousness (ISKCON; a.k.a. the Hare Krishna movement)
    - ISKCON Revival Movement
    - Science of Identity Foundation
    - Sri Caitanya Sangha
    - Sri Chaitanya Saraswat Math
    - Sri Sri Radha Govindaji Trust
    - World Vaisnava Association
  - Manipuri Vaishnavism, a regional form of Gaudiya Vaishnavism
- Nimbarka Sampradaya (a.k.a. Kumara Sampradaya), which adheres to the teachings of Nimbarkacharya. This tradition is associated with the Four Kumaras,
- Rudra Sampradaya, whose principal acharya is Vallabhacharya, the founder of the Pushtimarg tradition.
- Warkari Sampradaya, which adheres to the teachings of prominent bhakti saints of Maharashtra like Namadeva, Jnaneshwara, Eknath, Tukaram as well as Changadeva, Muktabai, Gora Kumbhar, Savata Mali, Narahari Sonar, Janabai, Sena Nhavi and Kanhopatra. The Warkari Sampradaya promotes the worship of god Vithoba, a manifestation of Krishna.
- Swaminarayan Sampradya, which adheres to the teachings of Sahajanand Swami, otherwise known as Swaminarayan.
  - Bochasanwasi Akshar Purushottam Swaminarayan Sanstha (BAPS)

Minor and regional Vaishnavite schools and the principal acharyas connected with them are:

- Balmikism, which is linked to sage Valmiki.
- Bishnoi Panth
  - Baul
- Ekasarana Dharma (Asomiya Vaishnavism), which adheres to the teachings of Srimanta Sankaradeva.
- Kapadi Sampradaya
- Mahanam Sampradaya, which adheres to the teachings of Prabhu Jagadbandu, who is considered to be the incarnation of Chaitanya Mahaprabhu.
- Mahanubhava panth, which adheres to the teachings of Sarvajna Shri Chakradhara.
- Odia Vaishnavism (Jagannathism), which is the regional cult of the god Jagannath as abstract form of Krishna.
- Pranami (Pranami Sampradaya), which adheres to the teachings of Devachandra Maharaj.
- Radha Vallabh Sampradaya, which adheres to the teachings of Hith Harivansh Mahaprabhu, emphasizes on the devotion of Radha as the supreme being.
- Ramsnehi Sampradaya
- Vaishnava-Sahajiya (tantric)
- Varkari

=== Shaivism ===
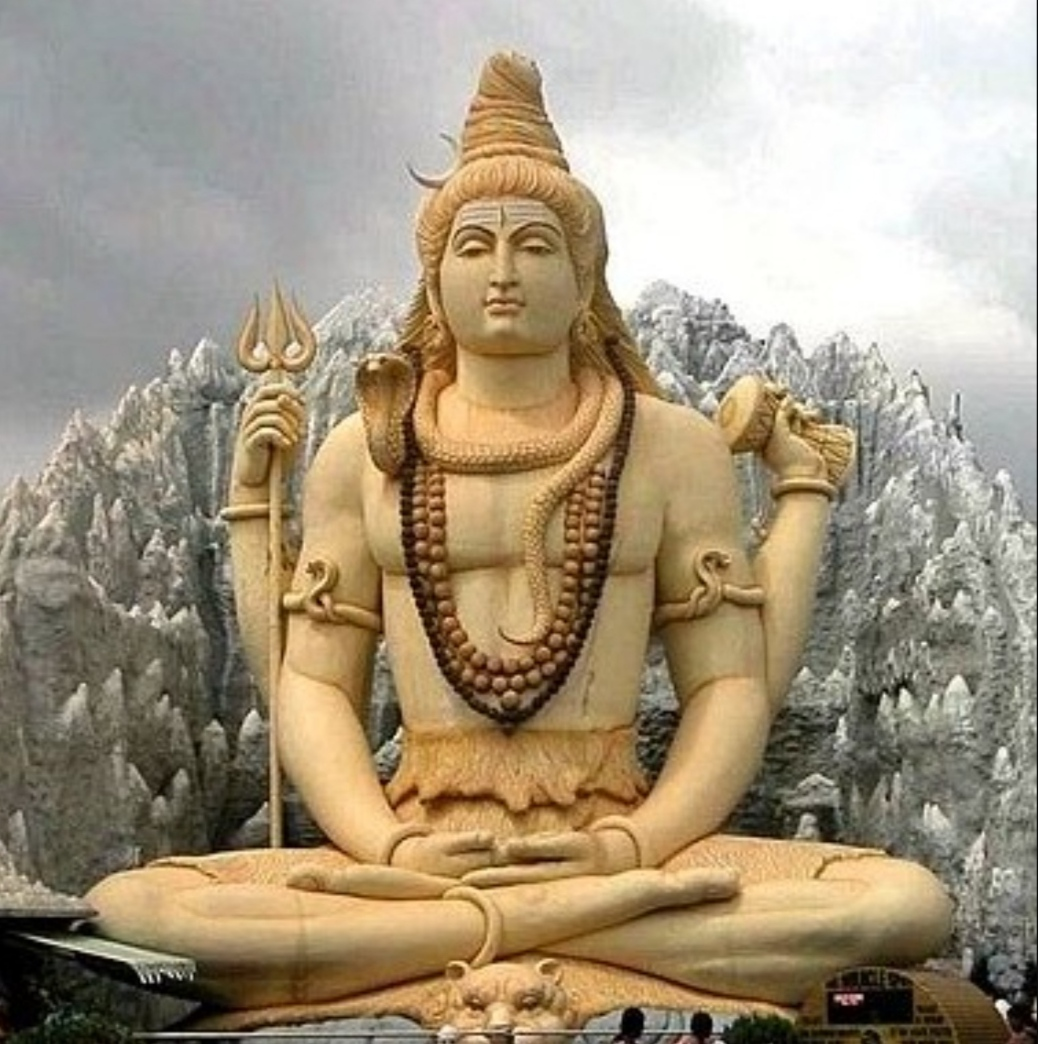
Shaivism focuses on Shiva

Shaivas or Shaivites are those who primarily worship Shiva as the supreme god, both immanent and transcendent. Shaivism embraces at the same time monism (specifically nondualism) and dualism. To Shaivites, Shiva is both with and without form; he is the Supreme Dancer, Nataraja; and is linga, without beginning or end. Shiva is sometimes depicted as the fierce god Bhairava. Shaivites are more attracted to asceticism than devotees of other Hindu sects and may be found wandering India with ashen faces, performing self-purification rituals. They worship in the temple and practice yoga, striving to be one with Shiva within.

The major schools of Shaivism include:

- Aghori
- Kalamukha
- Kapalika
- Kashmir Shaivism—adheres to the teachings of Vasugupta and his disciplinic lineage, including Abhinavagupta.
- Mantra marga
- Nath
  - Adinath Sampradaya (Siddha Siddhanta)—adheres to the teachings of Gorakhnatha and Matsyendranatha.
  - Inchegeri Sampradaya
- Pashupata Shaivism—adheres to the teachings of Lakulisa.
- Saiva Siddhanta—adheres to the teachings of Tirumular/Sundaranatha (Nandinatha Sampradaya, the monistic school) or of Meykandadeva (Meykandar Sampradaya, the dualistic school).
- Shiva Advaita—adheres to the teachings of Nilakantha (Srikantha) and Appayya Dikshita.
- Veerashaiva

Other branches:

- Lingayatism or Veerashaivism is a distinct Shaivite tradition in India, established in the 12th century by Basavanna. It departs from mainstream Hinduism and propounds monism through worship centered on Shiva in the form of a linga or Ishtalinga. It also rejects the authority of the Vedas and the caste system.

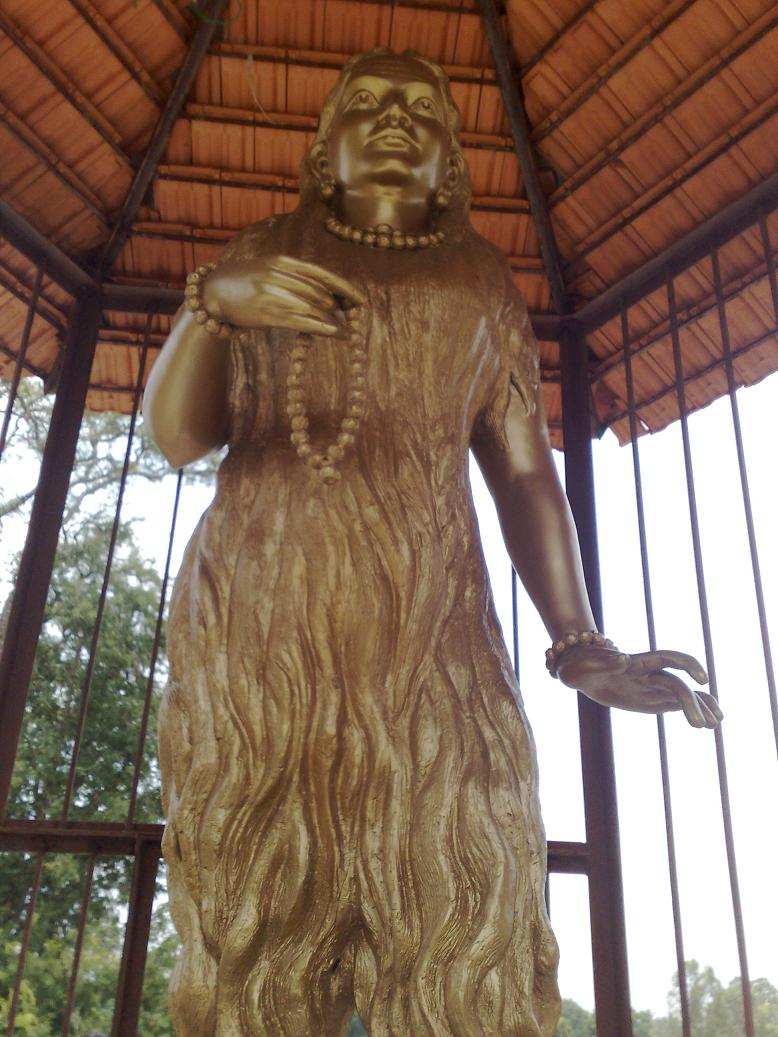
A statue of Akka Mahadevi, a famous Lingayat saint, installed at her birthplace, Udathadi

- Aaiyyanism is a religion claiming to be a form of pure Dravidian Hinduism and identifying as a Shaivite branch.

=== Shaktism ===
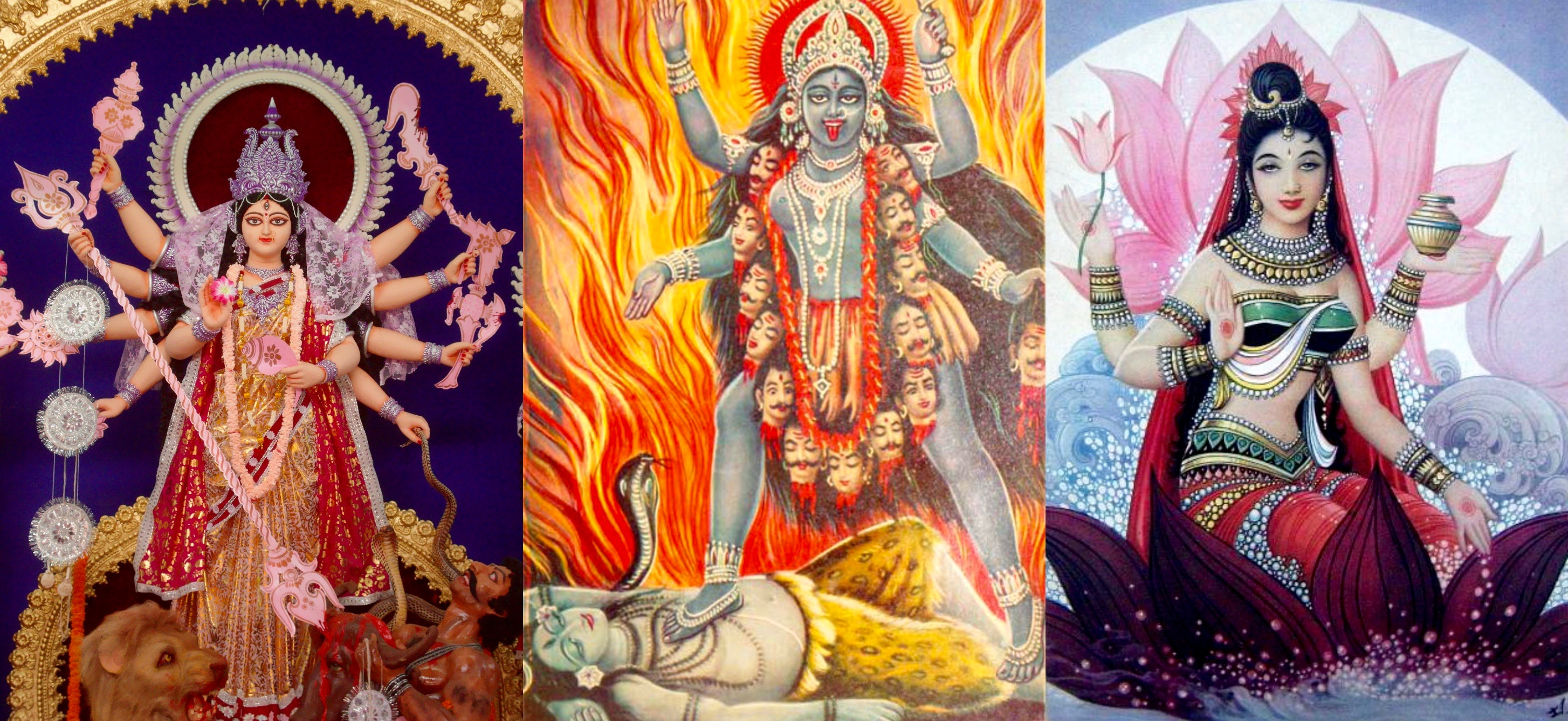
Shaktism is a Goddess-centric tradition of Hinduism. From left: Parvati/Durga, Kali and Lakshmi

Shaktas worship the Mother Goddess as Shakti, in different forms. These forms may include Kali, Parvati, Durga, Lakshmi, and Saraswati. The branch of Hinduism that worships the goddess Devi is called Shaktism. Followers of Shaktism recognize Shakti as the supreme power of the universe. Devi is often depicted as Parvati (the consort of Shiva) or as Lakshmi (the consort of Vishnu). She is also depicted in other manifestations, such as the protective Durga or the violent Kali. Shaktism is closely related to Tantric Hinduism, which teaches rituals and practices for the purification of the mind and body.

Animal sacrifice of cockerels, goats, and, to a lesser extent, water buffaloes is practiced by Shakta devotees, mainly at temples of goddesses such as Bhavani or Kali.

The main traditions are:

- Kalikula;
- Srikula.
- Caribbean Shaktism of the Caribbean

The Goddess-centric traditions within Kashmir Shaivism are Trika and Kubjika.

=== Smartism ===
Om

Smartas treat all deities as the same, and their temples include five deities (Pancopasana) or Panchadevata as personal, saguna (divine with form) manifestations of the nirguna (divine without form) Absolute, Brahman. The nature of God is a matter of individual choice, since different manifestations of God are held to be equivalent. It is nonsectarian as it encourages the worship of any personal god along with others such as Ganesha, Shiva, Shakti, Vishnu, and Surya.

The Smarta Tradition accepts two concepts of Brahman, which are the saguna brahman (the Brahman with attributes) and nirguna brahman (the Brahman without attributes). The nirguna Brahman is the unchanging Reality, however, the saguna Brahman is posited as a means to realizing this nirguna Brahman. In this tradition, the concept of the saguna Brahman is considered to be a useful symbolism and means for those who are still on their spiritual journey. However, the saguna concept is abandoned by the fully enlightened once they realize the identity of their own soul with that of the nirguna Brahman. A Smarta may choose any saguna deity (istadevata) such as Vishnu, Shiva, Shakti, Surya, Ganesha or any other, and this is viewed in Smarta Tradition as an interim step towards meditating on Om and the true nature of the supreme reality, thereby realizing the nirguna Brahman and its equivalence to one's own Atman, as in Advaita Vedanta.

The movement is credited to Shankara, who is regarded as the greatest teacher and reformer of the Smartas. According to Alf Hiltebeitel, Shankara established the nondualist interpretation of the Upanishads as the touchstone of a revived smarta tradition. The Sringeri Sharada Peetham in Karnataka, believed by its members to have been founded by Shankara, is still the centre of the Smarta sect for its followers. Smartas follow four other major Mathas, namely, Kanchi Kamakoti Peetham, Puri Govardhan Math, Dwaraka Sharada Peetham, and Jyotir Muth. All Mathas are headed by Sankaracharyas.

The traditions are:

- Shanmata

Panchayatana puja, also known as Pancha Devi Deva Puja, is a system of puja (worship) within the Smarta sampradaya.

=== Overlap ===
Halbfass states that, although traditions such as Shaivism and Vaishnavism may be regarded as "self-contained religious constellations", there is a degree of interaction and reference between the "theoreticians and literary representatives" of each tradition which indicates the presence of "a wider sense of identity, a sense of coherence in a shared context and of inclusion in a common framework and horizon". It is common to find Hindus revering Shiva, Vishnu, and Shakti, and celebrating festivals related to them at different times of the year. Temples often feature more than one, and Hinduism is better understood as a polycentric theosophy that leaves the choice of deity and ideas to the individual.

The key concepts and practices of the four major denominations of Hinduism can be compared as follows:

Comparison of four major traditions of Hinduism
	Shaiva Traditions	Vaishnava Traditions	Shakti Traditions	Smarta Traditions	Srauta Traditions	References
Scriptural authority	Vedas, Upanishads and Agamas	Vedas, Upanishads and Agamas	Vedas, Upanishads and Agamas	Vedas and Upanishads	Vedas	
Supreme deity	God Shiva	God Vishnu	Goddess Devi	None	None	
Creator	Shiva	Vishnu	Devi	Brahman principle	Brahman principle	
Avatar	Major	Key concept	Significant	Minor	Minor	
Monastic life	Recommends	Accepts	Accepts	Recommends	Accepts (with exceptions)	
Rituals, Bhakti	Affirms	Affirms	Affirms	Optional	Affirms	
Ahimsa and Vegetarianism	Recommends, Optional	Affirms	Optional	Affirms except for sacrificial occasions	Affirms except for sacrificial occasions	
Free will, Maya, Karma	Affirms	Affirms	Affirms	Affirms	Affirms	
Metaphysics	Brahman (Shiva), Atman (Soul, Self)	Brahman (Vishnu), Atman	Brahman (Devi), Atman	Brahman, Atman	Brahman, Atman, Karma, Dharma	
Epistemology (Pramana)	1. Perception; 2. Inference; 3. Reliable testimony 4. Self-evident	1. Perception; 2. Inference; 3. Reliable testimony	1. Perception; 2. Inference; 3. Reliable testimony	1. Perception; 2. Inference; 3. Comparison and analogy 4. Postulation, derivation 5. Negative/cognitive proof 6. Reliable testimony	1. Perception; 2. Inference; 3. Comparison and analogy 4. Postulation, derivation 5. Negative/cognitive proof 6. Reliable testimony	
Philosophy	Dvaita, qualified advaita, advaita	Dvaita, qualified advaita, advaita	Shakti-advaita	Advaita	Purva Mimamsa	
Salvation (Soteriology)	Jivanmukta, Charya-Kriyā-Yoga-Jnana	Videhamukti, Yoga, champions householder life	Bhakti, Tantra, Yoga	Jivanmukta, Advaita, Yoga, champions monastic life	Videhamukti, Yoga, Dharmic Karma, champions householder life	

== Other denominations ==
=== Suryaism / Saurism ===
The Suryaites or Sauras are followers of a Hindu denomination that started in the Vedic tradition, and worship Surya as the main visible form of the saguna Brahman. The Saura tradition was influential in South Asia, particularly in the west, north and other regions, with numerous Surya idols and temples built between 800 and 1000 CE. The Konark Sun Temple was built in the mid-13th century. During the iconoclasm of Islamic invasions and Hindu–Muslim wars, the temples dedicated to Sun-god were among those desecrated, images smashed and the resident priests of Saura tradition were killed, states André Wink. The Surya tradition of Hinduism declined in the 12th and 13th centuries CE and today remains as a very small movement except in Bihar, Jharkhand, and Eastern Uttar Pradesh. Sun worship has continued to be a dominant practice in Bihar, Jharkhand and Eastern Uttar Pradesh in the form of Chhath Puja (or Chhath Vrat) which is considered the primary festival of importance in these regions.

=== Ganapatism ===
Ganapatism is a Hindu denomination in which Ganesha is worshipped as the main form of the saguna Brahman. This sect was widespread and influential in the past and has remained important in Maharashtra.

=== Indonesian Hinduism ===
Hinduism dominated the islands of Java and Sumatra until the late 16th century, when a vast majority of the population converted to Islam. Only the Balinese people, who formed a majority on the island of Bali, retained this form of Hinduism over the centuries. Theologically, Balinese or Indonesian Hinduism is closer to Shaivism than to other major sects of Hinduism. The adherents consider Acintya the supreme god, and all other gods as his manifestations.

The term "Agama Hindu Dharma", the endonymous Indonesian name for "Indonesian Hinduism" can also refer to the traditional practices in Kalimantan, Sumatra, Sulawesi and other places in Indonesia, where people have started to identify and accept their agamas as Hinduism or Hindu worship has been revived. The revival of Hinduism in Indonesia has given rise to a national organisation, the Parisada Hindu Dharma.

=== Shrautism ===
Shrauta communities are very rare in India, the most well known being the ultra-orthodox Nambudiri Brahmins of Kerala. They follow the "Purva-Mimamsa" (earlier portion of Vedas) in contrast to Vedanta followed by other Brahmins. They place importance on the performance of Vedic Sacrifice (Yajna).

=== Kaumaram ===
Kaumaram is a sect of Hindus, especially found in South India and Sri Lanka where Kartikeya is worshipped as the Supreme God. The worshippers of Kartikeya are called Kaumaras.

=== Dattatreya Sampradaya ===
Dattatreya Sampradaya is a Hindu denomination associated with the worship of Dattatreya as the supreme god. This denomination found in Indian states like Maharashtra, Andhra Pradesh, Karnataka, Goa, Telangana, Gujarat, Madhya Pradesh, Rajasthan, and Uttarakhand. Dattatreya is often considered as an avatara of three Hindu gods Brahma, Vishnu and Shiva, collectively known as the Trimurti. Main traditions linked with Dattatreya Sampradaya are:

- Gurucharitra tradition – This tradition is named after the Marathi text Gurucharitra and it is based on the teachings of Nrusinha Saraswati as well as Shripada Shrivallabha. This tradition is widespread in Deccan region.
- Avadhuta Tradition.

=== Sant Mat ===
The Sant Mat was a group of reformer poet-sants and their adherents within Hinduism during the 14th–17th centuries who had desire for religious pluralism and non-ritualistic spirituality. Due to Kabir's affiliation with Vaishnavite Ramanandi Sampradaya and certain aspects of the creed, the Sant Mat is sometimes seen as part of Vaishnavism. Among its living traditions are:

- Dadupanth
- Kabir panth
- Ravidassia religion
- Sadh
- Udasi Sampradaya
- Nirmala
- Nanak Panth

=== Newer movements ===
The Hindu new religious movements that arose in the 19th to 20th century include:

- American Meditation Institute
- Ananda (Ananda Yoga)
- Ananda Ashrama
- Ananda Marga
- Art of Living Foundation
- Arya Samaj
- Ayyavazhi
- Brahma Kumaris
- Brahmoism (Brahmo Samaj)
  - Adi Dharm
  - Sadharan Brahmo Samaj
- Chinmaya Mission
- Datta Yoga
- Divine Life Society
- Hanuman Foundation
- Himalayan Institute of Yoga Science and Philosophy
- International Vedanta Society
- Isha Foundation
- Kriya Yoga Centers
- Mahima Dharma
- Mata Amritanandamayi Math
- Matua Mahasangha
- Meivazhi
- Narayana Dharma
- Nilachala Saraswata Sangha
- Oneness Movement
- Prarthana Samaj
- Ramakrishna Mission / Ramakrishna Math (a.k.a. Vedanta Society)
- Sahaja Yoga
- Sathya Sai Baba movement
- Satsang
- Satya Dharma
- School of Philosophy and Economic Science
- Self-Realization Fellowship / Yogoda Satsanga
- Shirdi Sai Baba movement
- Shri Ram Chandra Mission
- Shree Shree Anandamayee Sangha
- Siddha Yoga
- Sivananda Yoga Vedanta Centres
- Sri Aurobindo Ashram
- Sri Chinmoy Centres
- Sri Ramana Ashram
  - Neo-Advaita
  - Society of Abidance in Truth
- Swadhyay Parivar
- Transcendental Meditation
- Virat Hindustan Sangam
- Lokhimon, a Vaishnavism movement followed by the Karbi people of Northeast India

=== Sarnaism ===
Sarna are sacred groves in the Indian religious traditions of the Chota Nagpur Plateau region in the states of Jharkhand, Bihar, Assam, and Chhattisgarh. Followers of these rituals primarily belong to the Munda, Bhumij, Kharia, Baiga, Ho, Kurukh, and Santal. According to local belief, a Gram deoti or village deity resides in the sarna, where sacrifice is offered twice a year. Their belief system is called "Sarnaism", "Sarna Dharma" or "Religion of the Holy Woods".

=== Kiratism ===
The practice is also known as Kirat Veda, Kirat-Ko Veda or Kirat Ko Ved. According to some scholars, such as Tom Woodhatch, it is shamanism, animistic religion or blend of shamanism, animism (e.g., ancestor worshiping of Yuma Sammang/Tagera Ningwaphumang and Paruhang/Sumnima), and Shaivism.

== Related denominations ==
=== Kalash and Nuristani religion ===
The Indo-Aryan Kalash people in Pakistan traditionally practice an indigenous religion which some authors characterise as an archaic form of ancient Indo-Aryan religion. The Nuristanis of Afghanistan and Pakistan until the late 19th century had followed a religion which was described as a form of ancient Hinduism.

=== Contemporary Sant Mat ===
The contemporary Sant Mat is a 19th-century origin movement. Scholars are divided as to whether to call Radha Soami a 1) Sikh-derived or 2) Hindu–Sikh-synthesed or 3) independent version of the medieval Sant Mat as new universal religion.

- Advait Mat
- Radha Soami
  - Radha Soami Satsang Beas
  - Radha Soami Satsang Dayalbagh
  - Radha Swami Satsang Dinod
  - Ruhani Satsang
- Radha Soami-influenced
  - Ancient Teachings of the Masters
  - Dera Sacha Sauda
  - Eckankar
  - Elan Vital, formerly Divine Light Mission
  - Manavta Mandir
  - Movement of Spiritual Inner Awareness
  - Science of Spirituality
    - Sawan Kirpal Ruhani Mission

=== Slavic Vedism ===
Slavic, Russian, Peterburgian Vedism, or simply Vedism are terms used to describe one of the earliest branches of Slavic Native Faith ("Rodnovery")—contemporary indigenous development of Vedic forms of religion in Russia, especially of Saint Petersburg's communities, other Slavic countries, and generally all the post-Soviet states. The word "Vedism" comes from the verb "to know" (vedat)—a semantic root which is shared in Slavic and Sanskrit languages alike.

Slavic Vedism involves the worship of Vedic gods, characterised by its use of indigenous Slavic rituals and Slavic names for the deities, distinguishing from other groups which have maintained a stronger bond with modern Hinduism, although Krishnaite groups often identify themselves as "Vedic" too. Also some syncretic groups within Slavic Native Faith (Slavic Neopaganism) use the term "Vedism".

== Cross-denominational influences ==
=== Bhakti movement ===
The Bhakti movement was a theistic devotional trend that originated in the seventh-century Tamil south India (now parts of Tamil Nadu and Kerala), and spread northwards. It swept over east and north India from the fifteenth-century onwards, reaching its zenith between the 15th and 17th century CE. The Bhakti movement regionally developed as Hindu denominations around different gods and goddesses, such as Vaishnavism (Vishnu), Shaivism (Shiva), Shaktism (Shakti goddesses), and Smartism. The movement was inspired by many poet-saints, who championed a wide range of philosophical positions ranging from theistic dualism of Dvaita to absolute monism of Advaita Vedanta. Scriptures of the Bhakti movement include the Bhagavad Gita, Bhagavata Purana and Padma Purana.

As part of the legacy of the Alvars, five Vaishnava philosophical traditions (sampradayas) have developed at the later stages.

=== Philosophical schools ===
Hindu philosophy is traditionally divided into six āstika (Sanskrit: आस्तिक "orthodox") schools of thought, or darśanam (दर्शनम्, "view"), which accept the Vedas as the supreme revealed scriptures. The schools are:

1. Samkhya, a non-theistic and strongly dualist theoretical exposition of consciousness and matter.
2. Yoga, a school emphasizing meditation, contemplation and liberation.
3. Nyaya or logic, which explores sources of knowledge. The foundational text of this school is the Nyāya Sūtras.
4. Vaisheshika, an empiricist school of atomism.
5. Mimāṃsā, an anti-ascetic and anti-mysticist school of orthopraxy.
6. Vedanta, the last segment of knowledge in the Vedas, or the 'Jnan' (knowledge) 'Kanda' (section).

The nāstika/heterodox schools are (in chronological order):

1. Cārvāka
2. Jainism
3. Ājīvika
4. Buddhism
5. Ajñana

However, medieval philosophers like Vidyāraṇya classified Indian philosophy into sixteen schools, where schools belonging to Shaiva, Pāṇini, and Raseśvara thought are included with others. The three Vedantic schools—Advaita, Vishishtadvaita and Dvaita (which had emerged as distinct schools by then)—are classified separately.

In Hindu history, the distinction of the six orthodox schools was current in the Gupta period "golden age" of Hinduism. With the disappearance of Vaisheshika and Mimamsa, it was obsolete by the later Middle Ages and modern times, when the various sub-schools of Vedanta began to rise to prominence as the main divisions of religious philosophy, as follows:

- Advaita Vedanta
- Akshar-Purushottam Darshan
- Bhedabheda
  - Achintya Bheda Abheda
  - Dvaitadvaita
- Dvaita Vedanta
- Integral yoga
- Pratyabhijna
- Shaiva Siddhanta
- Shiva Advaita
- Shuddhadvaita
- Vishishtadvaita

Nyaya survived into the 17th century as Navya Nyaya "Neo-Nyaya", while Samkhya gradually lost its status as an independent school, its tenets absorbed into Yoga and Vedanta.

=== Yoga varieties ===
- Ananda Yoga
- Bhakti yoga
- Hatha yoga
  - Bihar School of Yoga
- Integral Yoga
- Jivamukti Yoga
- Jnana yoga
- Karma yoga
- Kripalu Yoga
- Kriya Yoga
- Kundalini yoga
- Raja yoga
- Sahaja Yoga
- Siddha Yoga
- Sivananda yoga
- Surat Shabd Yoga
- Tantric Yoga

== See also ==
- Donyipoloism
- Sanamahism
- Shanmata
- List of Hindu organisations
