= Hindu deities =

Gods and goddesses in Hinduism

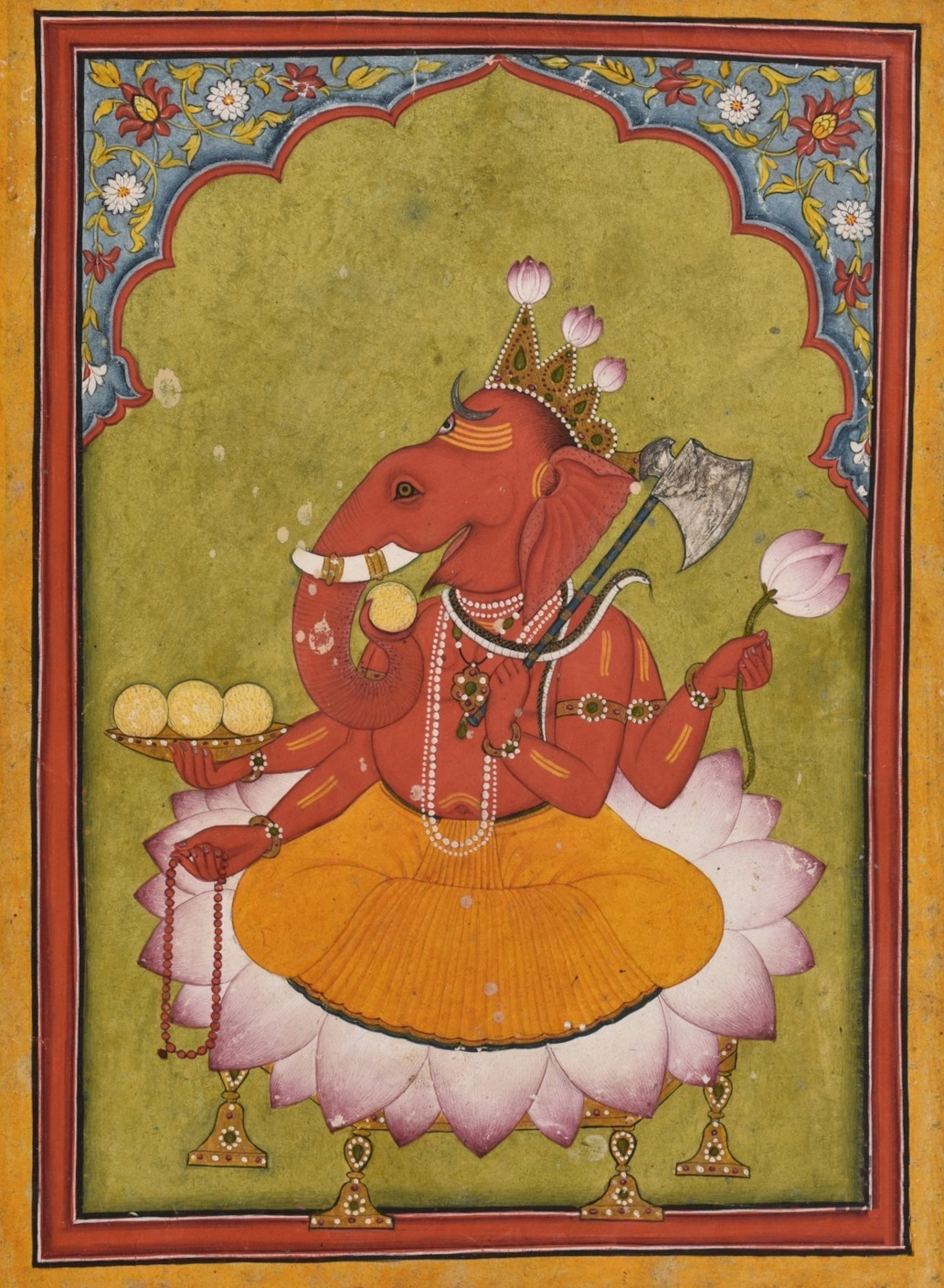
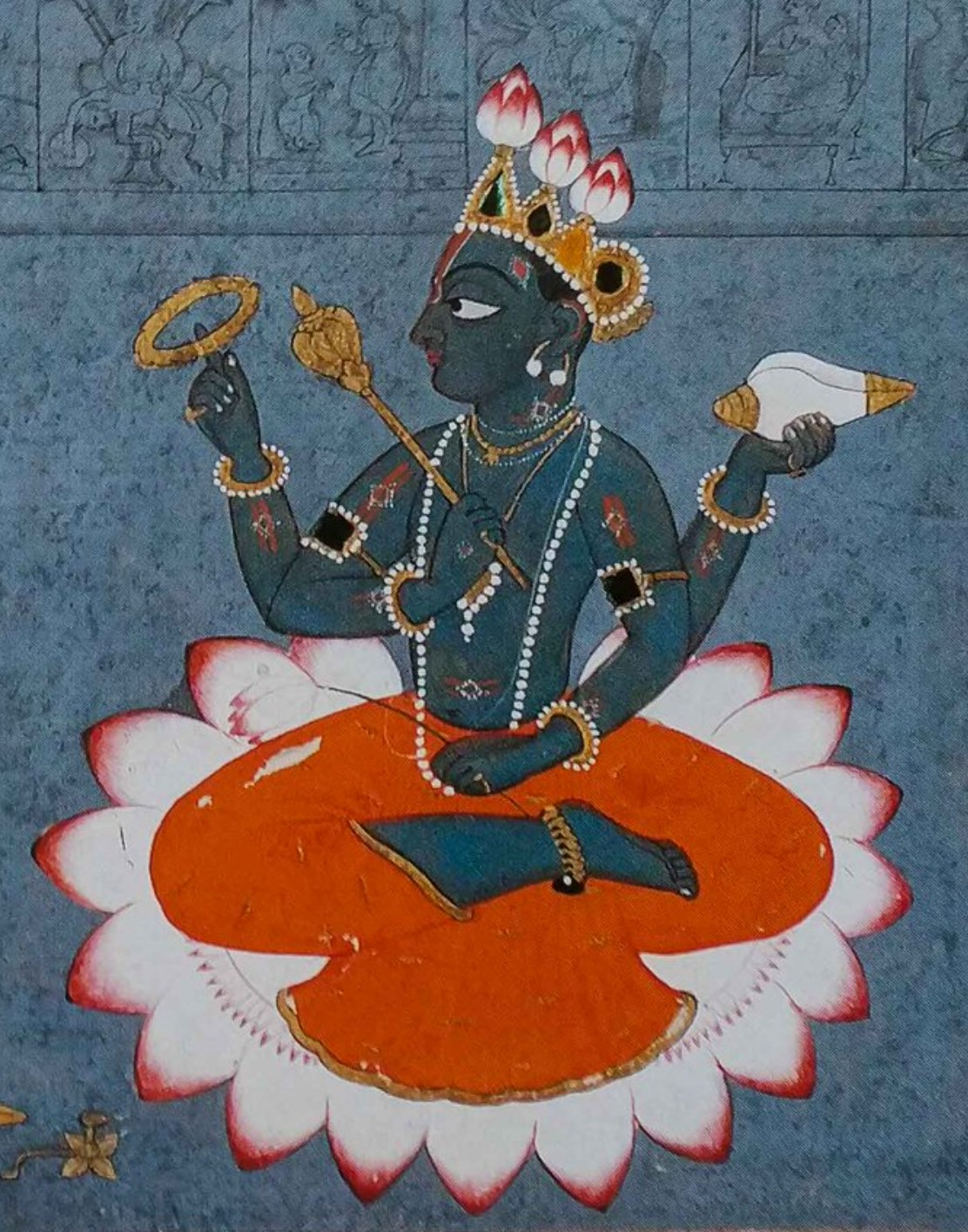
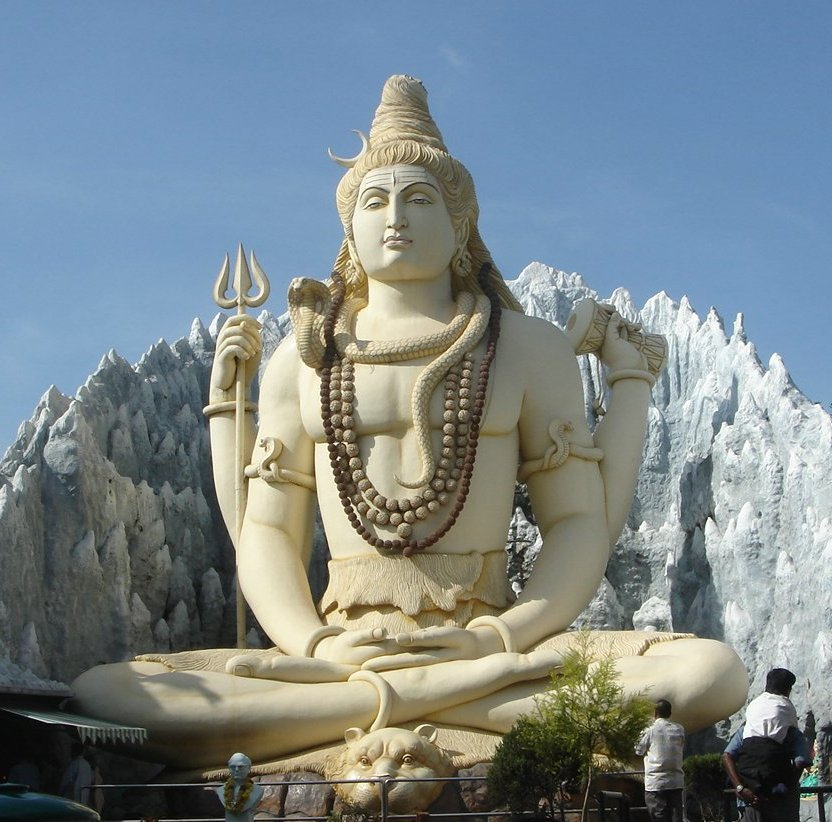
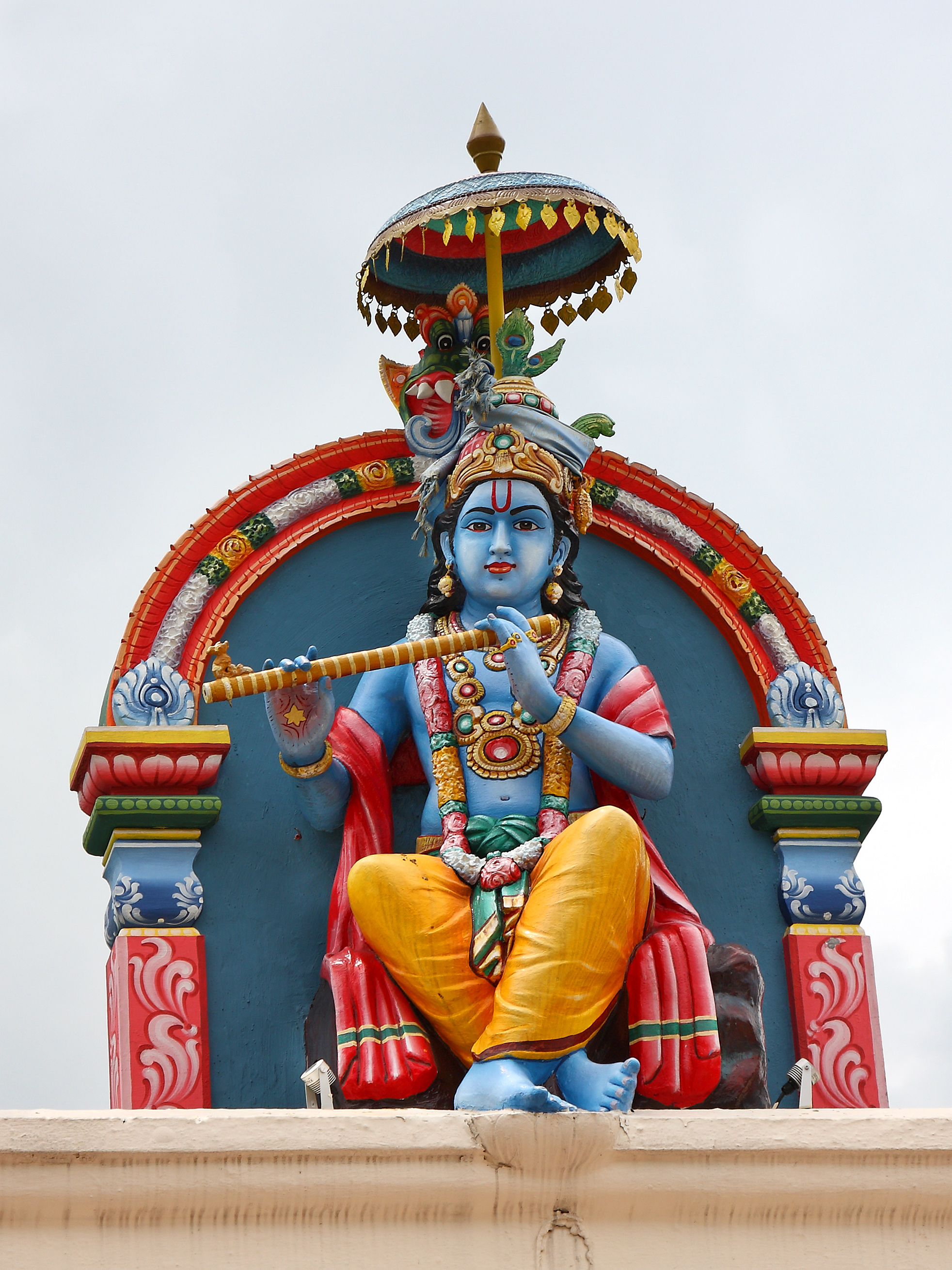
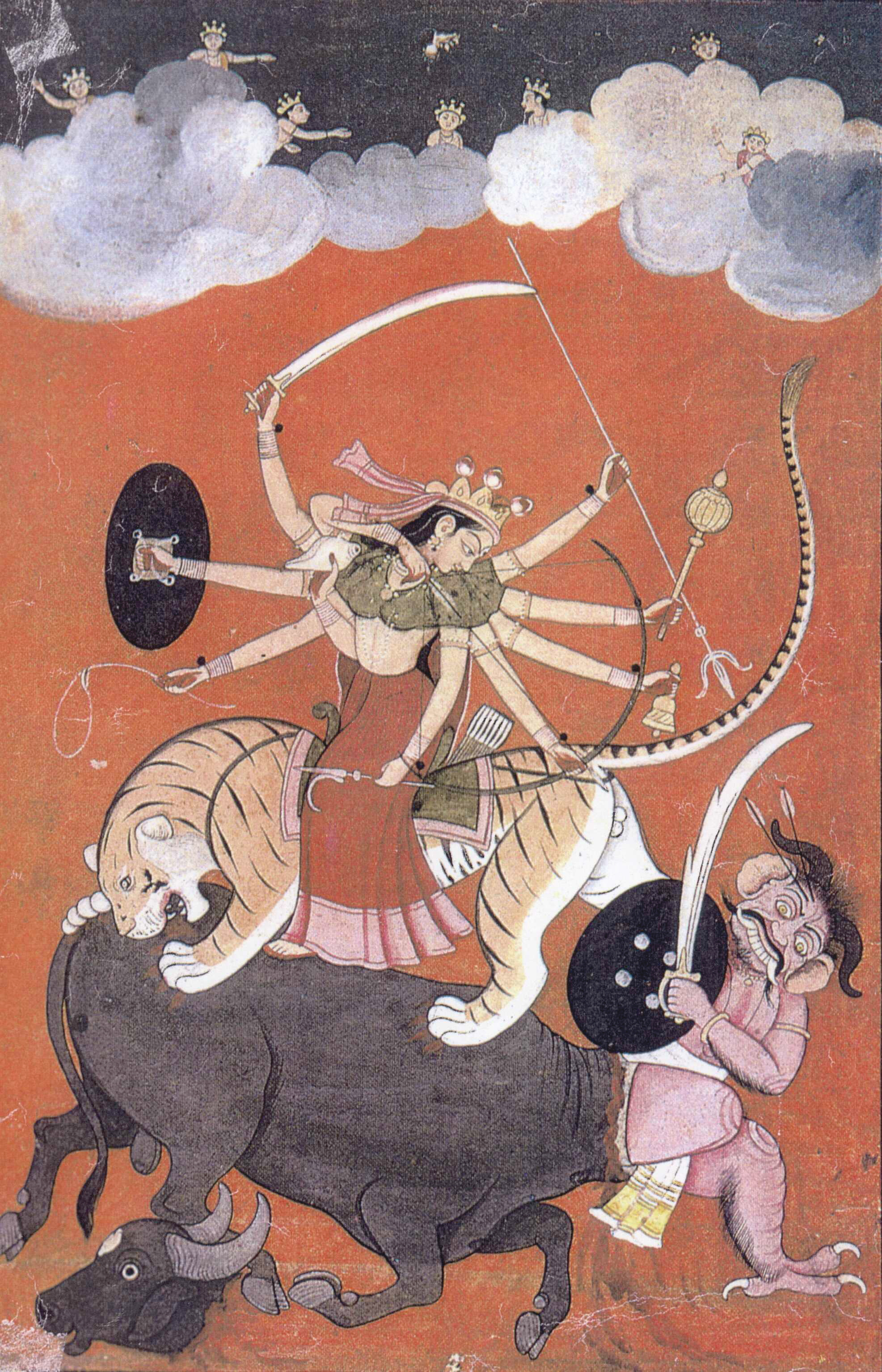
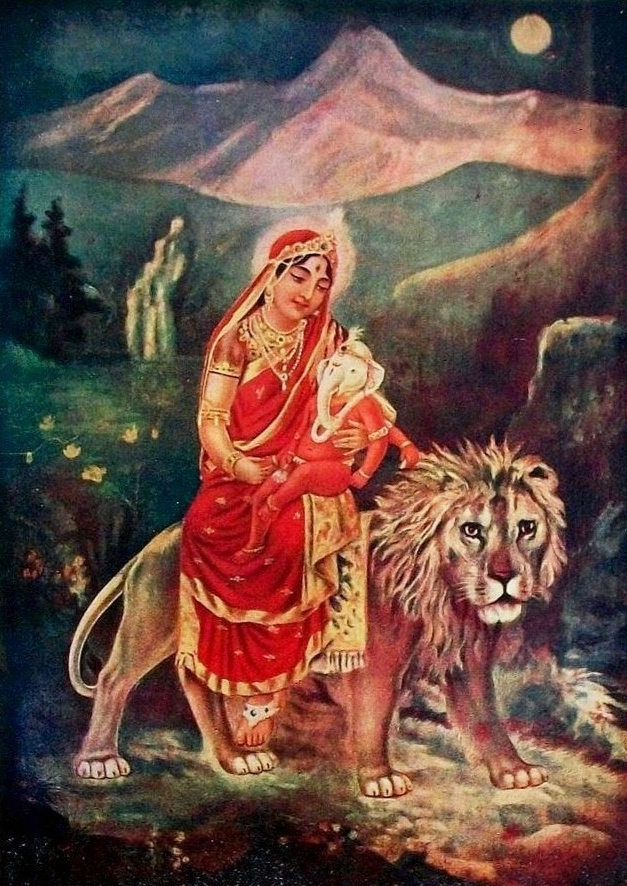
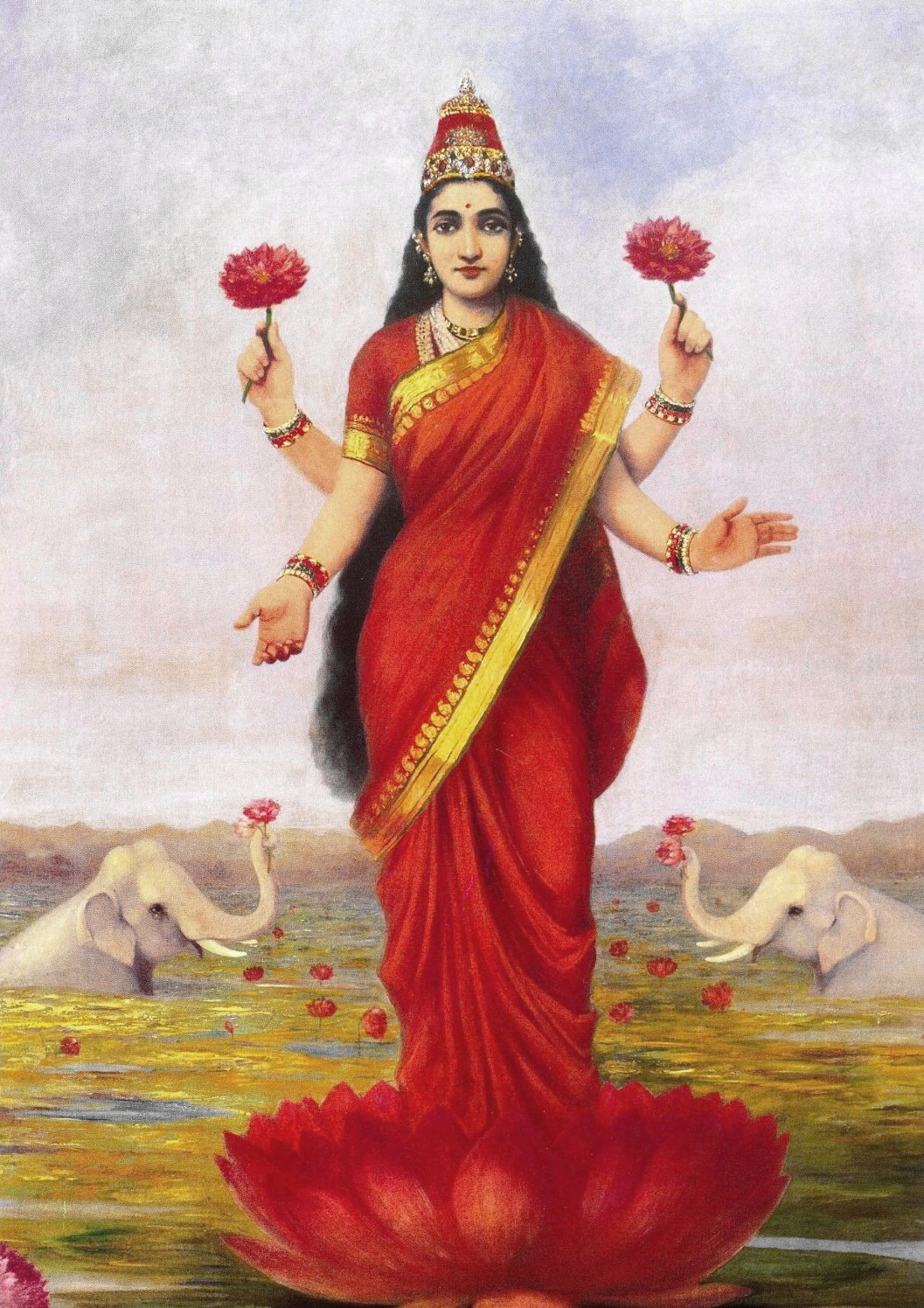
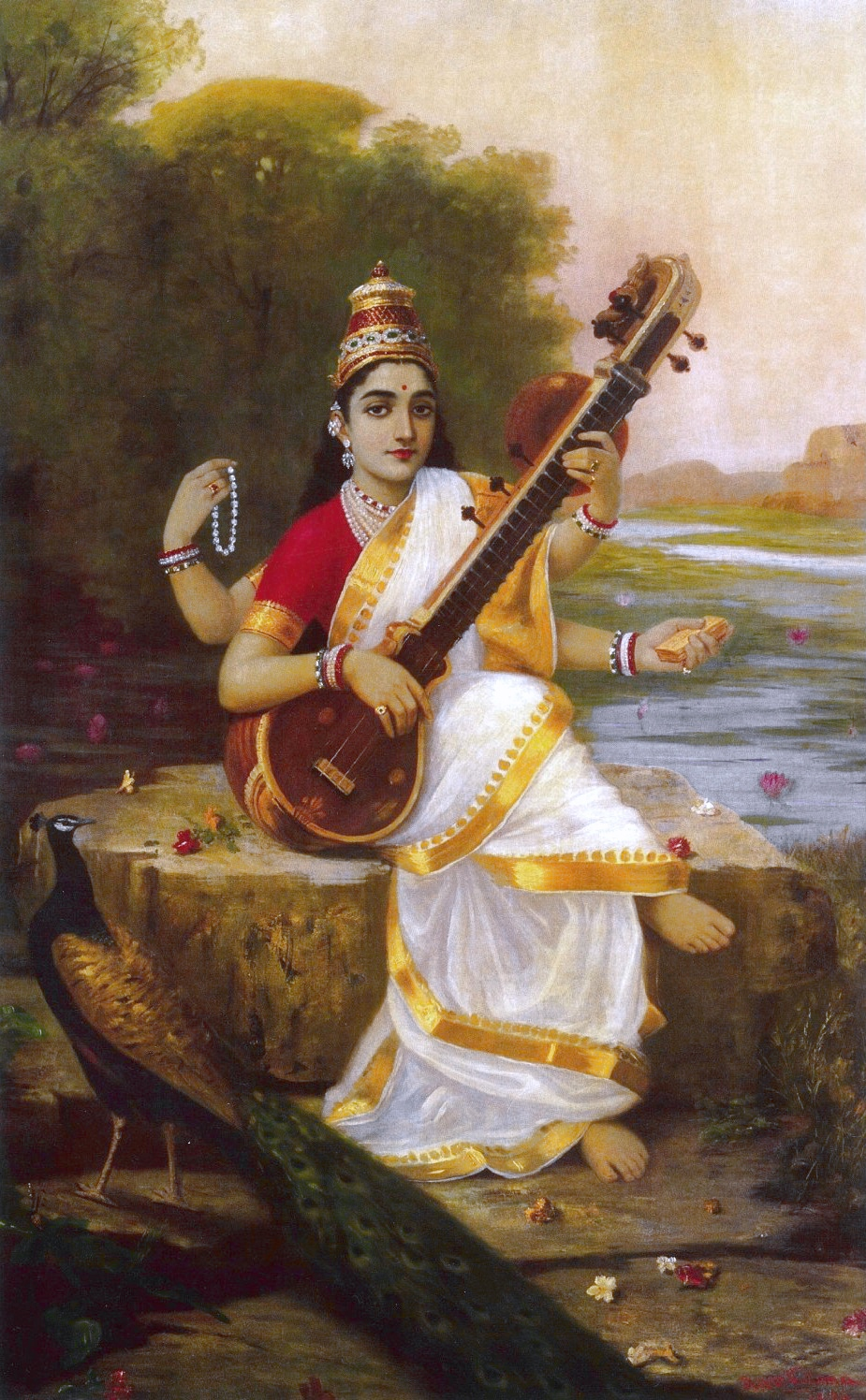
Examples of Hindu deities (from top): Ganesha, Vishnu, Shiva, Indra, Krishna, Durga, Parvati, Lakshmi and Saraswati.

Hindu deities are the gods and goddesses in Hinduism. Deities in Hinduism are as diverse as its traditions, and a Hindu can choose to be polytheistic, pantheistic, monotheistic, monistic, or even agnostic, atheistic or humanistic. The terms and epithets for deities within the diverse traditions of Hinduism vary, and include Deva, Devi, Ishvara, Ishvari, Bhagavān and Bhagavati. (Note: For translation of deva in singular noun form as "a deity, god", and in plural form as "the gods" or "the heavenly or shining ones", see: Monier-Williams 2001, p. 492 and Renou 1964, p. 55)

The deities of Hinduism have evolved from the Vedic era (2nd millennium BCE) through the medieval era (first millennium CE), regionally within Nepal, Pakistan, India and in Southeast Asia, and across Hinduism's diverse traditions. The Hindu deity concept varies from a personal god as in Yoga school of Hindu philosophy, to thirty-three major deities in the Vedas, to hundreds of deities mentioned in the Puranas of Hinduism. Examples of modern major deities include Vishnu, Shiva, Ganesha and Devi. These deities have distinct and complex personalities, yet are often viewed as aspects of the same Ultimate Reality called Brahman. (Note: [a] Hark, Lisa; DeLisser, Horace (2011). Achieving Cultural Competency. John Wiley & Sons. "Three gods, Brahma, Vishnu, and Shiva, and other deities are considered manifestations of and are worshipped as incarnations of Brahman." [b] Toropov & Buckles 2011: The members of various Hindu sects worship a dizzying number of specific deities and follow innumerable rites in honour of specific gods. Because this is Hinduism, however, its practitioners see the profusion of forms and practices as expressions of the same unchanging reality. The panoply of deities are understood by believers as symbols for a single transcendent reality. [d] Orlando O. Espín, James B. Nickoloff (2007). An Introductory Dictionary of Theology and Religious Studies. Liturgical Press. "While Hindus believe in many devas, many are monotheistic to the extent that they will recognise only one Supreme Being, a God or Goddess who is the source and ruler of the devas.") From ancient times, the idea of equivalence has been cherished for all Hindus, in its texts and in early first-millennium sculpture with concepts such as Harihara (Half Vishnu, Half Shiva) and Ardhanārīshvara (half Shiva, half Parvati), with myths and temples that feature them together, declaring they are the same. Major deities have inspired their own Hindu traditions, such as Vaishnavism, Shaivism and Shaktism, but with shared mythology, ritual grammar, theosophy, axiology and polycentrism. Some Hindu traditions, such as Smartism from the mid 1st millennium CE, have included multiple major deities as henotheistic manifestations of Saguna Brahman, and as a means to realizing Nirguna Brahman. In Samkhya philosophy, Devata or deities are considered as "natural sources of energy" who have Sattva as the dominant Guna.

Hindu deities are represented with various icons and anicons in sculptures and paintings, called Murtis and Pratimas. Some Hindu traditions, such as ancient Charvakas, rejected all deities and concept of god or goddess, while 19th-century British colonial era movements such as the Arya Samaj and Brahmo Samaj rejected deities and adopted monotheistic concepts similar to Abrahamic religions. Hindu deities have been adopted in other religions such as Jainism, and in regions outside India, such as predominantly Buddhist Thailand and Japan, where they continue to be revered in regional temples or arts.

In ancient and medieval era texts of Hinduism, the human body is described as a temple, and deities are described to be parts residing within it, while the Brahman (Absolute Reality, God) is described to be the same, or of similar nature, as the Atman (Self), which Hindus believe is eternal and within every living being.

== Devas and devis ==
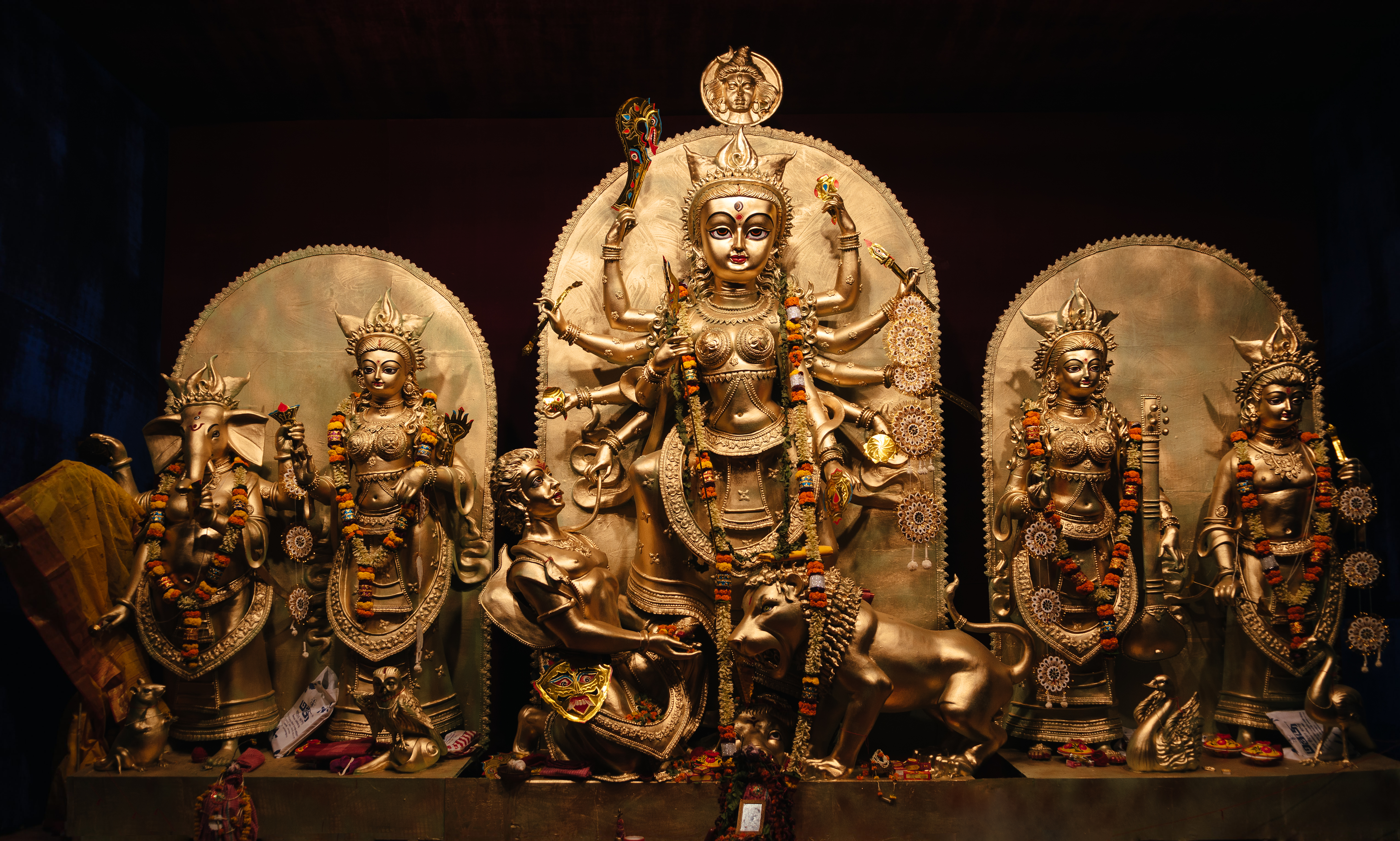
Goddess Durga and a pantheon of other gods and goddesses being worshipped during Durga Puja Festival in Kolkata.

Deities in Hinduism are referred to as Deva (masculine) and Devi (feminine). The root of these terms means "heavenly, divine, anything of excellence".

In the earliest Vedic literature, all supernatural beings are called Asuras. By the late Vedic period (c. 500 BCE), benevolent supernatural beings are referred to as Deva-Asuras. In post-Vedic texts, such as the Puranas and the Itihasas of Hinduism, the Devas represent the good, and the Asuras the bad. In some medieval Indian literature, Devas are also referred to as Suras and contrasted with their equally powerful, but malevolent counterparts referred to as the Asuras.

Hindu deities are part of Hindu mythology, both Devas and Devis feature in one of many cosmological theories in Hinduism.

=== Characteristics of Vedic-era deities ===
In Vedic literature, Devas and Devis represent the forces of nature and some represent moral values (such as the Adityas, Varuna, and Mitra), each symbolizing the epitome of specialised knowledge, creative energy, exalted and magical powers (Siddhis).

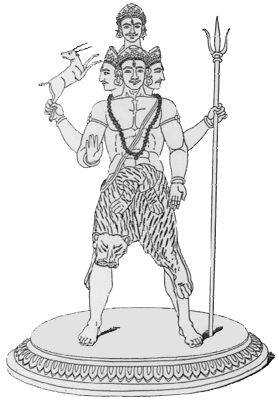
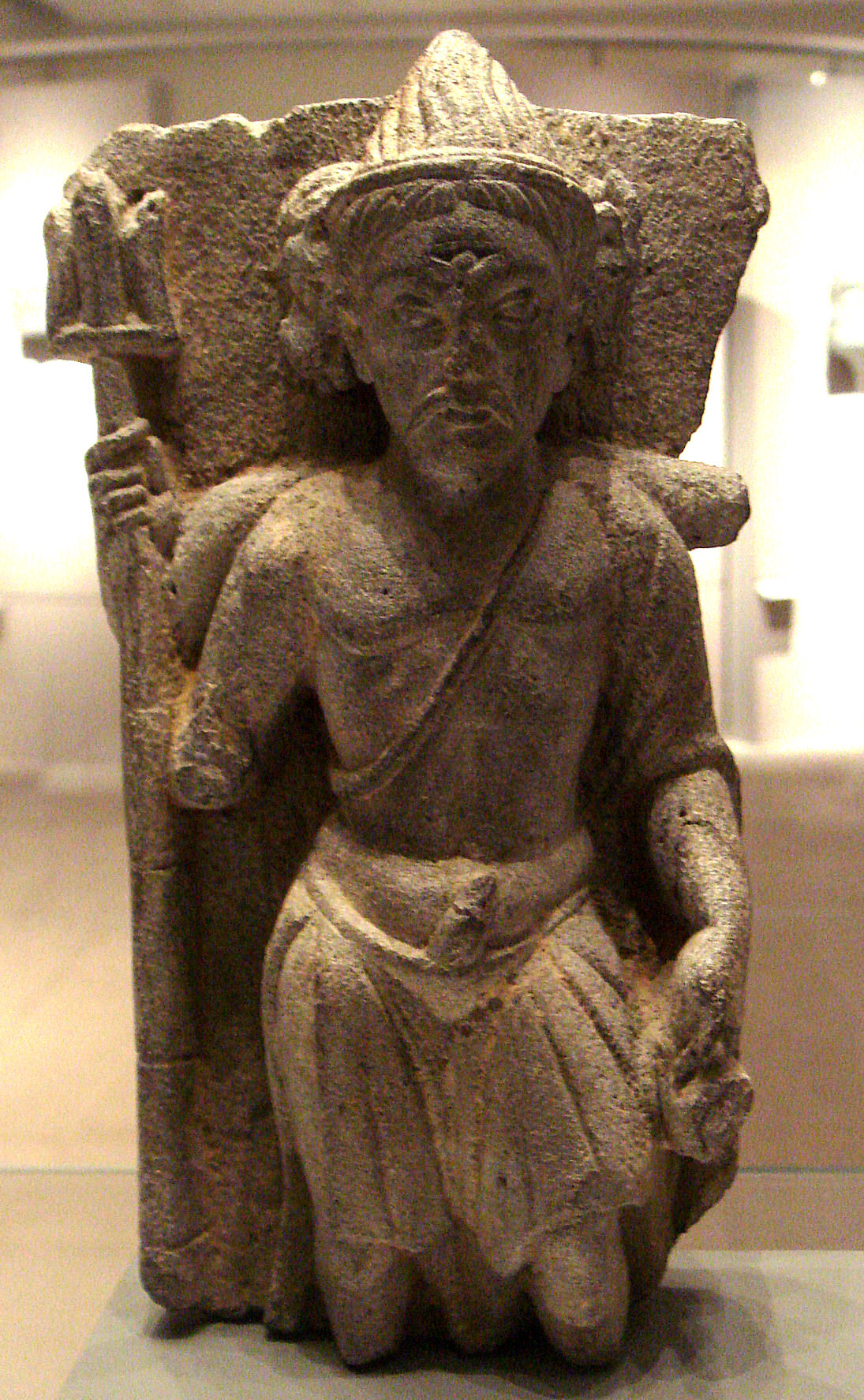
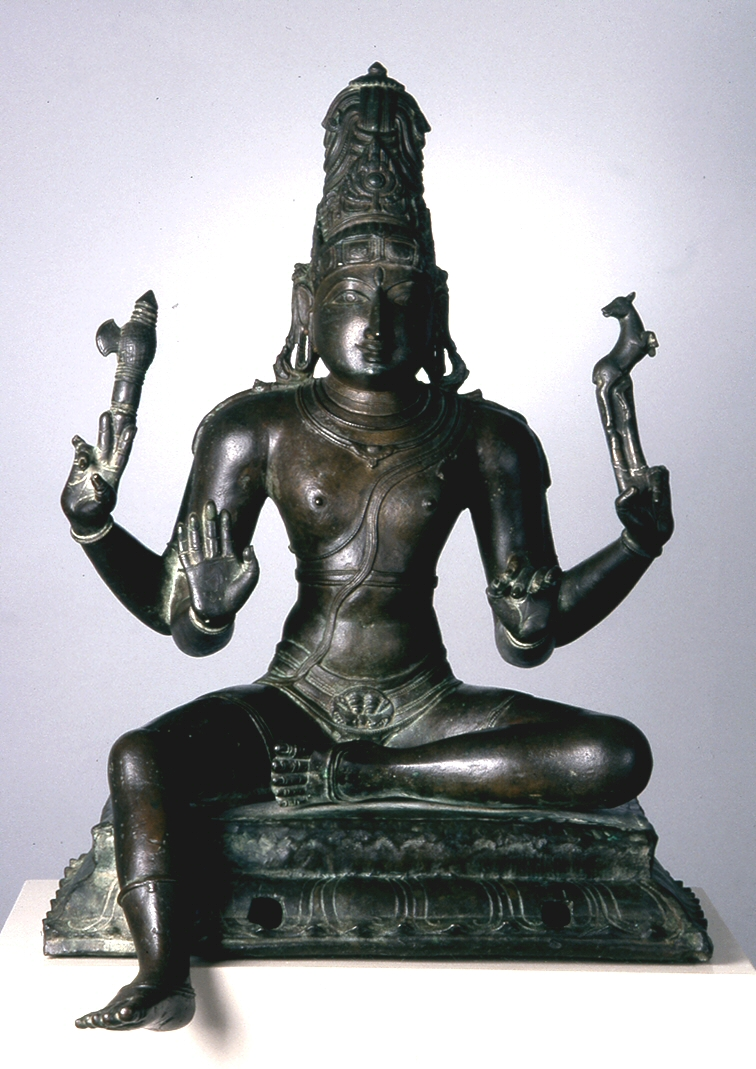
Vedic era deities evolved. Rudra (left) is represented in Vedic literature, is shown as Shiva-Rudra 2nd-century sculpture (middle), and as Shiva (meaning kind) in 13th-century artwork (right). The iconography evolved, retaining some symbolic elements such as trident, axe, or antelope.

The most referred to Devas in the Rigveda are Indra, Agni (fire) and Soma, with "fire deity" called the friend of all humanity. Indra and Soma are two celebrated in a yajna fire ritual that marks major Hindu ceremonies. Savitr, Vishnu, Rudra (later given the exclusive epithet of Shiva), and Prajapati (later Brahma) are gods and hence Devas.

The Vedas describes a number of significant Devis such as Ushas (dawn), Prithvi (earth), Aditi (cosmic moral order), Saraswati (river, knowledge), Vāc (sound), Nirṛti (destruction), Ratri (night), Aranyani (forest), and bounty goddesses such as Dinsana, Raka, Puramdhi, Parendi, Bharati, Mahi, among others, mentioned in the Rigveda. Sri, also called Lakshmi, appears in late Vedic texts dated to be pre-Buddhist, but verses dedicated to her do not suggest that her characteristics were fully developed in the Vedic era. All gods and goddesses are distinguished in the Vedic times, but in the post-Vedic texts (c. 500 BCE to 200 CE), and particularly in the early medieval era literature, they are ultimately seen as aspects or manifestations of one Brahman, the Supreme power.

Ananda Coomaraswamy states that Devas and Asuras in the Vedic lore are similar to Angels-Theoi-Gods and Titans of Greek mythology, both are powerful but have different orientations and inclinations, the Devas representing the powers of Light and the Asuras representing the powers of Darkness in Hindu mythology. According to Coomaraswamy's interpretation of Devas and Asuras, both these natures exist in each human being, the tyrant and the angel is within each being, the best and the worst within each person struggles before choices and one's nature, and the Hindu formulation of Devas and Asuras is an eternal dance between these within each person.

The Devas and Asuras, Angels and Titans, powers of Light and powers of Darkness in Rigveda, although distinct and opposite in operation, are in essence consubstantial, their distinction being a matter not of essence but of orientation, revolution, or transformation. In this case, the Titan is potentially an Angel, the Angel still by nature a Titan; the Darkness in actu is Light, the Light in potentia Darkness; whence the designations Asura and Deva may be applied to one and the same Person according to the mode of operation, as in Rigveda 1.163.3, "Trita art thou (Agni) by interior operation".

— Ananda Coomaraswamy, Journal of the American Oriental Society

=== Characteristics of medieval-era deities ===
In the Puranas and the Itihasas with the embedded Bhagavad Gita, the Devas represent the good, and the Asuras the bad. According to the Bhagavad Gita (16.6–16.7), all beings in the universe have both divine qualities (daivi sampad) and demonic qualities (asuri sampad) within them. The sixteenth chapter of the Bhagavad Gita states that pure god-like saints are rare, as are pure demon-like evil individuals among human beings. Instead, the majority of humanity is multi-charactered with a few or many faults. According to Jeaneane Fowler, the Gita states that desires, aversions, greed, needs, emotions in various forms "are facets of ordinary lives". It is only when they turn to lust, hate, cravings, arrogance, conceit, anger, harshness, hypocrisy, violence, cruelty and such negativity- and destruction-inclined tendencies that natural human inclinations metamorphose into something demonic (Asura).

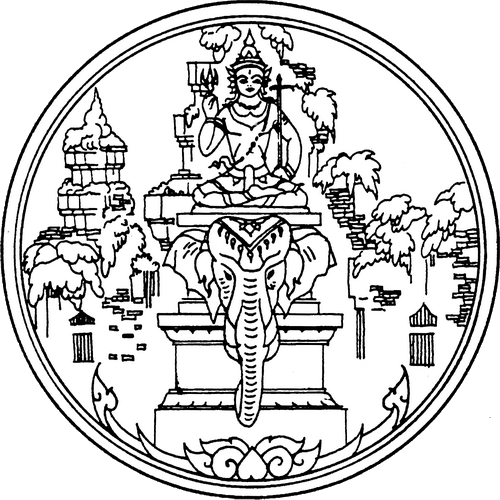
Indra is a Vedic era deity, found in south and southeast Asia. Above Indra is part of the seal of a Thailand state.

The Epics and medieval era texts, particularly the Puranas, developed extensive and richly varying mythologies associated with Hindu deities, including their genealogies. Several of the Purana texts are named after major Hindu deities such as Vishnu, Shiva and Devi. Other texts and commentators such as Adi Shankara explain that Hindu deities live or rule over the cosmic body as well as in the temple of the human body. They remark that the Sun deity is the eyes, the Vāyu the nose, the Prajapati the sexual organs, the Lokapalas the ears, Chandra the mind, Mitra the inward breath, Varuna the outward breath, Indra the arms, Bṛhaspati the speech, Vishnu, whose stride is great, is the feet, and Māyā is the smile.

=== Symbolism ===
Edelmann states that gods and anti-gods of Hinduism are symbolism for spiritual concepts. For example, god Indra (a Deva) and the antigod Virocana (an Asura) question a sage for insights into the knowledge of the self. Virocana leaves with the first given answer, believing now he can use the knowledge as a weapon. In contrast, Indra keeps pressing the sage, churning the ideas, and learning about means to inner happiness and power. Edelmann suggests that the Deva-Asura dichotomies in Hindu mythology may be seen as "narrative depictions of tendencies within our selves". Hindu deities in Vedic era, states Mahoney, are those artists with "powerfully inward transformative, effective and creative mental powers".

In Hindu mythology, everyone starts as an Asura, born of the same father. "Asuras who remain Asura" share the character of powerful beings craving for more power, more wealth, ego, anger, unprincipled nature, force and violence. The "Asuras who become Devas" in contrast are driven by an inner voice, seek understanding and meaning, prefer moderation, principled behavior, aligned with Ṛta and Dharma, knowledge and harmony.

The god (Deva) and antigod (Asura), states Edelmann, are also symbolically the contradictory forces that motivate each individual and people, and thus Deva-Asura dichotomy is a spiritual concept rather than mere genealogical category or species of being. In the Bhāgavata Purana, saints and gods are born in families of Asuras, such as Mahabali and Prahlada, conveying the symbolism that motivations, beliefs and actions rather than one's birth and family circumstances define whether one is Deva-like or Asura-like.

== Ishvara ==
Ishvara is, along with Shiva, Vishnu and Brahma, one of the 17 deities commonly found in Indonesian Surya Majapahit Hindu arts and records. However, Ishvara represents different concepts in various Hindu philosophies.

Another Hindu term that is sometimes translated as the deity is Ishvara, or various deities are described, state Sorajjakool et al., as "the personifications of various aspects of the same Ishvara". The term Ishvara has a wide range of meanings that depend on the era and the school of Hinduism. In ancient texts of Indian philosophy, Ishvara means supreme Self, Brahman (Highest Reality), ruler, king or husband depending on the context. In medieval era texts, Ishvara means God, Supreme Being, personal god, or special Self depending on the school of Hinduism.

Among the six systems of Hindu philosophy, Samkhya and Mimamsa do not consider the concept of Ishvara, i.e., a supreme being, relevant. Yoga, Vaisheshika, Vedanta, and Nyaya schools of Hinduism discuss Ishvara but assign different meanings.

Early Nyaya school scholars considered the hypothesis of a deity as a creator God with the power to grant blessings, boons, and fruits; but these early Nyaya scholars then rejected this hypothesis, and were non-theistic or atheists. Later scholars of Nyaya school reconsidered this question and offered counter arguments for what is Ishvara and various arguments to prove the existence of an omniscient, omnipresent, omnipotent deity (God).

Vaisheshika school of Hinduism, as founded by Kanada in the 1st millennium BCE, neither required nor relied on a creator deity. Later Vaisheshika school adopted the concept of Ishvara, states Klaus Klostermaier, but as an eternal God who co-exists in the universe with eternal substances and atoms, but He "winds up the clock, and lets it run its course".

Ancient Mimamsa scholars of Hinduism questioned what is Ishvara (deity, God)? They considered a deity concept unnecessary for a consistent philosophy and moksha (soteriology).

In the Samkhya school of Hindu philosophy, Isvara is neither a creator-God nor a savior-God. This is called one of the several major atheistic schools of Hinduism by some scholars. Others, such as Jacobsen, state that Samkhya is more accurately described as non-theistic. Deity is considered an irrelevant concept, neither defined nor denied, in Samkhya school of Hindu philosophy.

In the Yoga school of Hinduism, it is any "personal deity" (Ishta Deva or Ishta Devata) or "spiritual inspiration", but not a creator God. Whicher explains that while Patanjali's terse verses in the Yogasutras can be interpreted both as theistic or non-theistic, Patanjali's concept of Isvara in Yoga philosophy functions as a "transformative catalyst or guide for aiding the yogin on the path to spiritual emancipation".

The Advaita Vedanta school of Hinduism asserted that there is no dualistic existence of a deity (or deities). There is no otherness nor distinction between Jiva and Ishvara. God (Ishvara, Brahman) is identical with the Atman (Self) within each human being in Advaita Vedanta school, and there is a monistic Universal Absolute Oneness that connects everyone and everything.

In Dvaita sub-school of Vedanta Hinduism, Ishvara is defined as a creator God that is distinct from Jiva (individual Selfs in living beings). In this school, God creates individual Self (Atman), but the individual Self never was and never will become one with God; the best it can do is to experience bliss by getting infinitely close to God.

== Number of deities ==
Yantra as aniconic deities
- Sri Yantra symbolizing the goddess Tripura Sundari
- Yantras or mandalas (shown) are 3-D images. In Tantra, a minority tradition in Hinduism, they are considered identical with deity. Similar tantric yantras are found in Jainism and Buddhism as well.

Yāska, the earliest known language scholar of India (c. 500 BCE), mentions that there are three deities (Devas) according to the Vedas, "Agni (fire), whose place is on the earth; Vayu (wind), whose place is the air; and Surya (sun), whose place is in the sky". This principle of three worlds (or zones), and its multiples is found thereafter in many ancient texts. The Samhitas, which are the oldest layer of text in Vedas enumerate 33 devas, (Note: The list of Vedic Devas somewhat varies across the manuscripts found in different parts of South Asia, particularly in terms of guides (Aswins) and personified Devas. One list based on Book 2 of Aitereya Brahmana is: Devas personified: Indra (Śakra), Varuṇa, Mitra, Aryaman, Bhaga, Aṃśa, Vidhatr (Brahma), Tvāṣṭṛ, Pūṣan, Vivasvat, Savitṛ (Dhatr), Vishnu.; Devas as abstractions or inner principles: Ānanda (bliss, inner contentment), Vijñāna (knowledge), Manas (mind, thought), Prāṇa (life-force), Vāc (speech), Ātmā (Self within each person), and five manifestations of Rudra/Shiva – Īśāna, Tatpuruṣa, Aghora, Vāmadeva, Sadyojāta; Devas as forces or principles of nature – Pṛthivī (earth), Agni (fire), Antarikṣa (atmosphere, space), Jal (water), Vāyu (wind), Dyauṣ (sky), Sūrya (sun), Nakṣatra (stars), Soma (moon); Devas as guide or creative energy – Vasatkara, Prajāpati) either 11 each for the three worlds, or as 12 Adityas, 11 Rudras, 8 Vasus and 2 Ashvins in the Brahmanas layer of Vedic texts.

The Rigveda states in hymn 1.139.11,

ये देवासो दिव्येकादश स्थ पृथिव्यामध्येकादश स्थ ।
अप्सुक्षितो महिनैकादश स्थ ते देवासो यज्ञमिमं जुषध्वम् ॥११॥

O ye eleven gods whose home is heaven, O ye eleven who make earth your dwelling,
Ye who with might, eleven, live in waters, accept this sacrifice, O gods, with pleasure.
– Translated by Ralph T. H. Griffith

Gods who are eleven in heaven; who are eleven on earth;
and who are eleven dwelling with glory in mid-air; may ye be pleased with this our sacrifice.
– Translated by HH Wilson

— Rigveda 1.139.11

=== One or one-ness ===
Thirty-three koti (33 supreme) divinities are mentioned in other ancient texts, such as the Yajurveda. Most, by far, are goddesses, state Foulston and Abbott, suggesting "how important and popular goddesses are" in Hindu culture. Scholars state all deities are typically viewed in Hinduism as "emanations or manifestation of genderless principle called Brahman, representing the many facets of Ultimate Reality". In Hinduism, the concept is that "God, the universe, human beings and all else is essentially one thing" and there is a connected oneness where the same God resides within every human being as Atman, the eternal Self.

== Iconography and practices ==
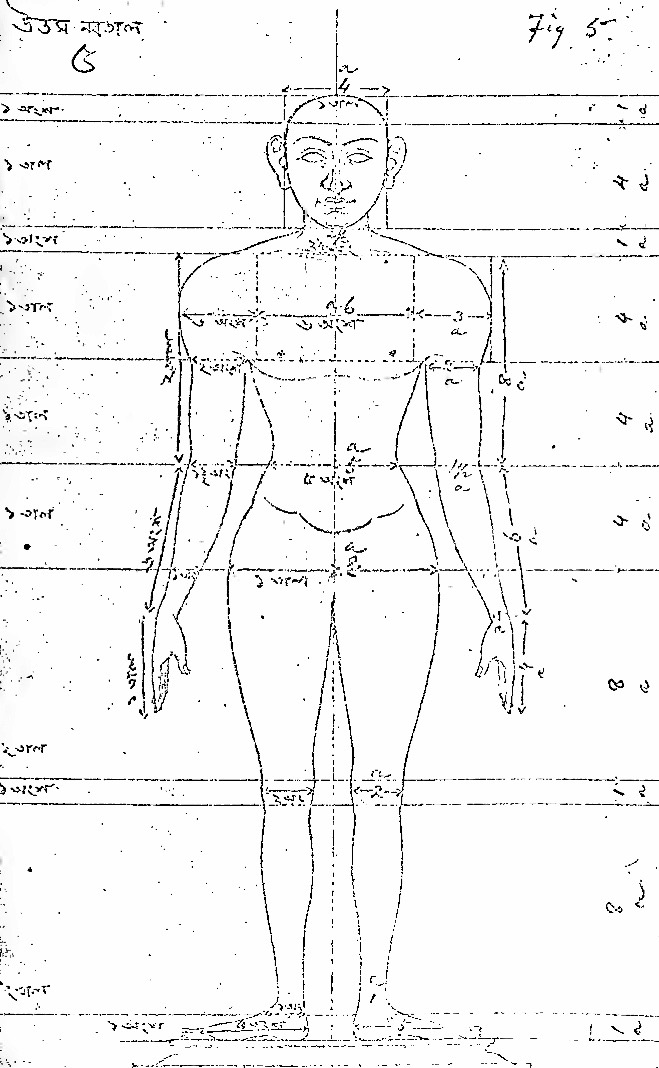
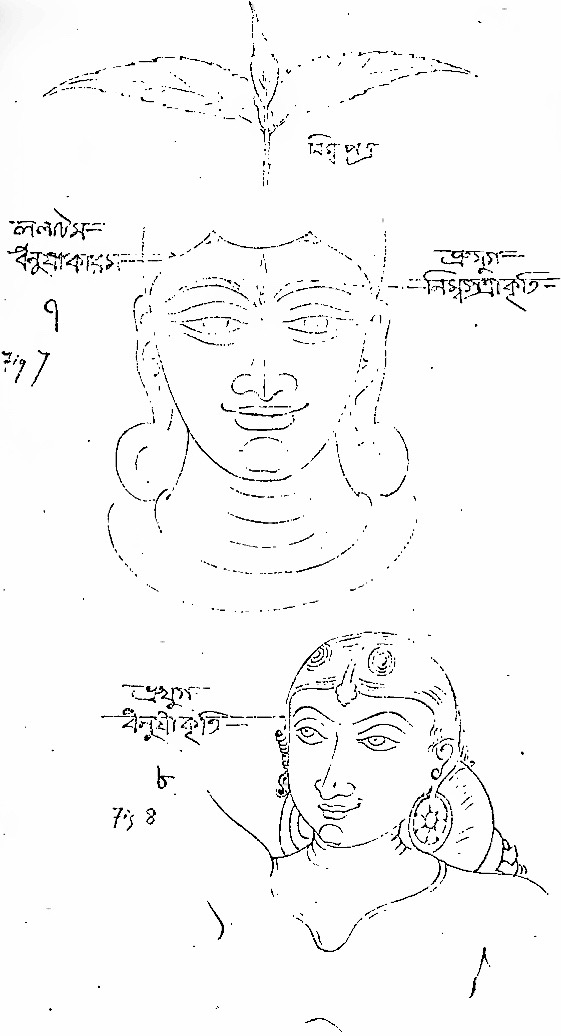
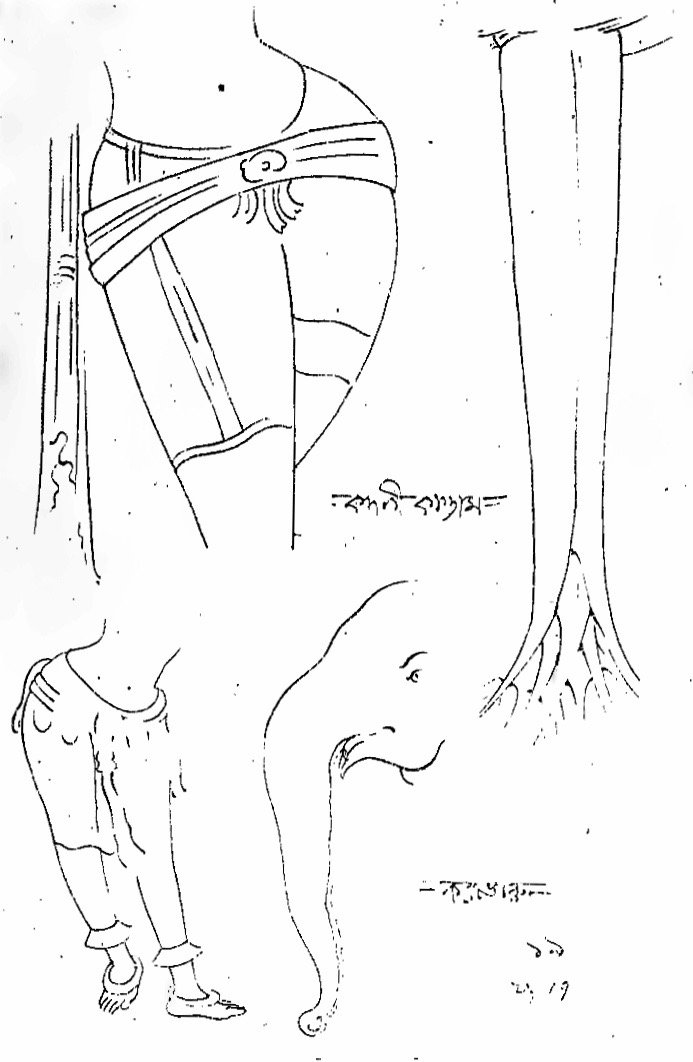
Proper Murti design is described in ancient and medieval Indian texts (Bengali). They describe proportions, posture, and expressions among other details, often referencing nature.
A Hindu prayer before cutting a tree for a Murti

Oh, Tree! you have been selected for the worship of a deity,
Salutations to you!
I worship you per rules, kindly accept it.
May all who live in this tree, find residence elsewhere,
May they forgive us now, we bow to them.

— Brihat Samhita 59.10 - 59.11

Hinduism has an ancient and extensive iconography tradition, particularly in the form of Murti (Sanskrit: मूर्ति, IAST: Mūrti), or Vigraha or Pratima. A Murti is itself not the god in Hinduism, but it is an image of god and represents emotional and religious value. A literal translation of Murti as an idol is incorrect, states Jeaneane Fowler when the idol is understood as superstitious end in itself. Just like the photograph of a person is not the real person, a Murti is an image in Hinduism but not the real thing, but in both cases, the image reminds of something of emotional and real value to the viewer. When a person worships a Murti, it is assumed to be a manifestation of the essence or spirit of the deity, the worshipper's spiritual ideas and needs are meditated through it, yet the idea of ultimate reality or Brahman is not confined in it.

A Murti of a Hindu deity is typically made by carving stone, woodworking, metal casting, or through pottery. Medieval era texts describing their proper proportions, positions and gestures include the Puranas, Agamas and Samhitas particularly the Shilpa Shastras. The expressions in a Murti vary in diverse Hindu traditions, ranging from Ugra symbolism to express destruction, fear and violence (Durga, Parvati, Kali), as well as Saumya symbolism to express joy, knowledge, and harmony (Parvati, Saraswati, Lakshmi). Saumya images are most common in Hindu temples. Other Murti forms found in Hinduism include the Linga.

A Murti is an embodiment of the divine, the Ultimate Reality or Brahman to some Hindus. In the religious context, they are found in Hindu temples or homes, where they may be treated as a beloved guest and serve as a participant of Puja rituals in Hinduism. A murti is installed by priests, in Hindu temples, through the Prana Pratishtha ceremony, whereby state Harold Coward and David Goa, the "divine vital energy of the cosmos is infused into the sculpture" and then the divine is welcomed as one would welcome a friend. In other occasions, it serves as the centre of attention in annual festive processions and these are called Utsava Murti.

=== Temple and worship ===
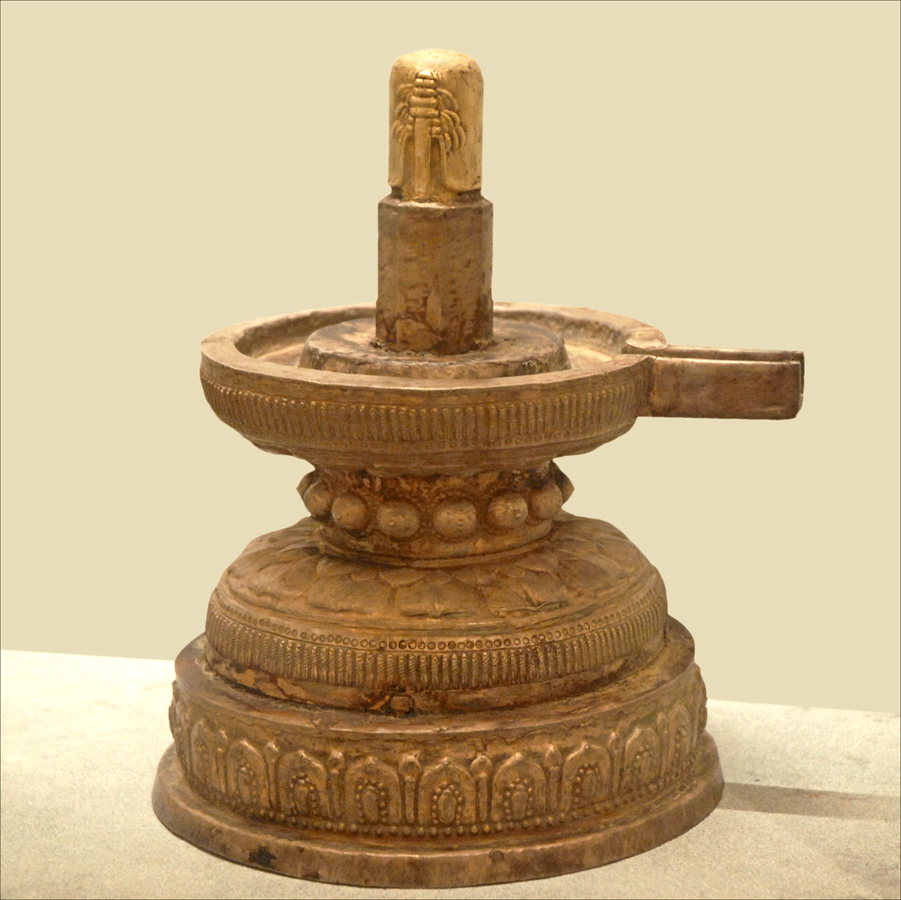
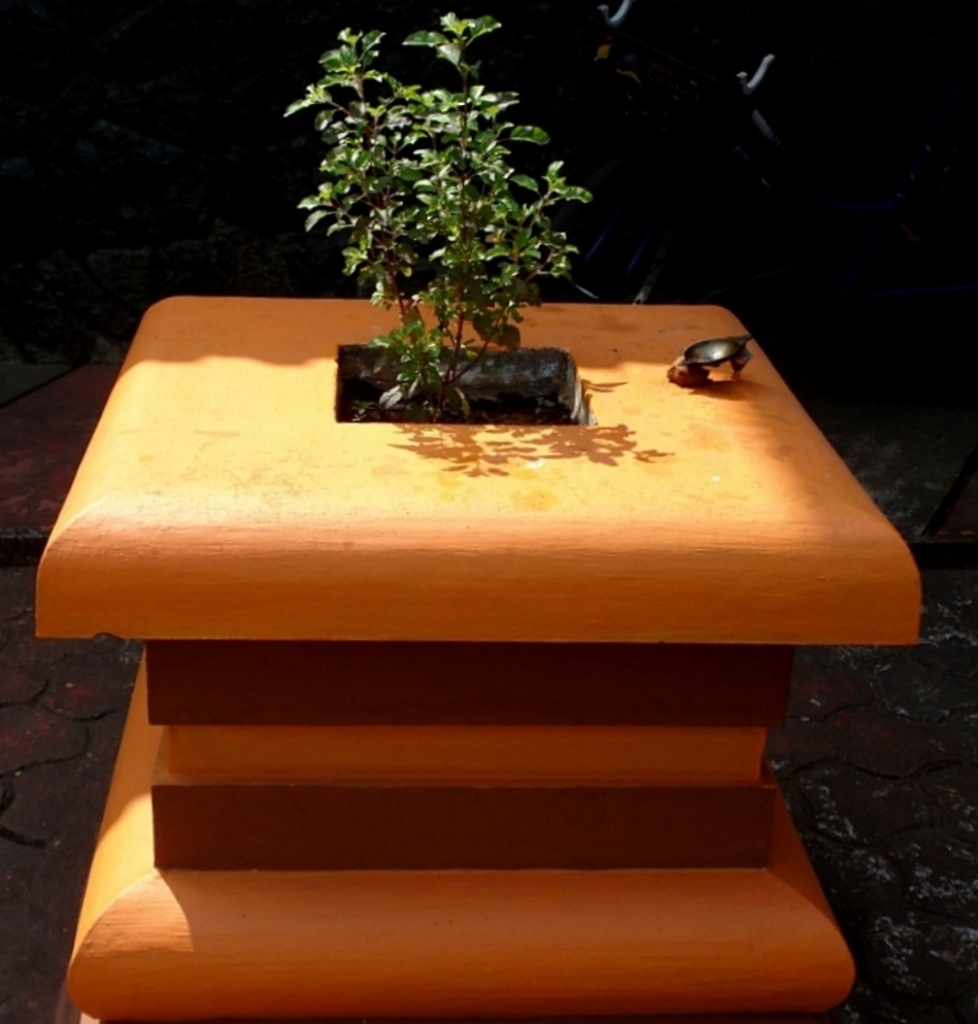
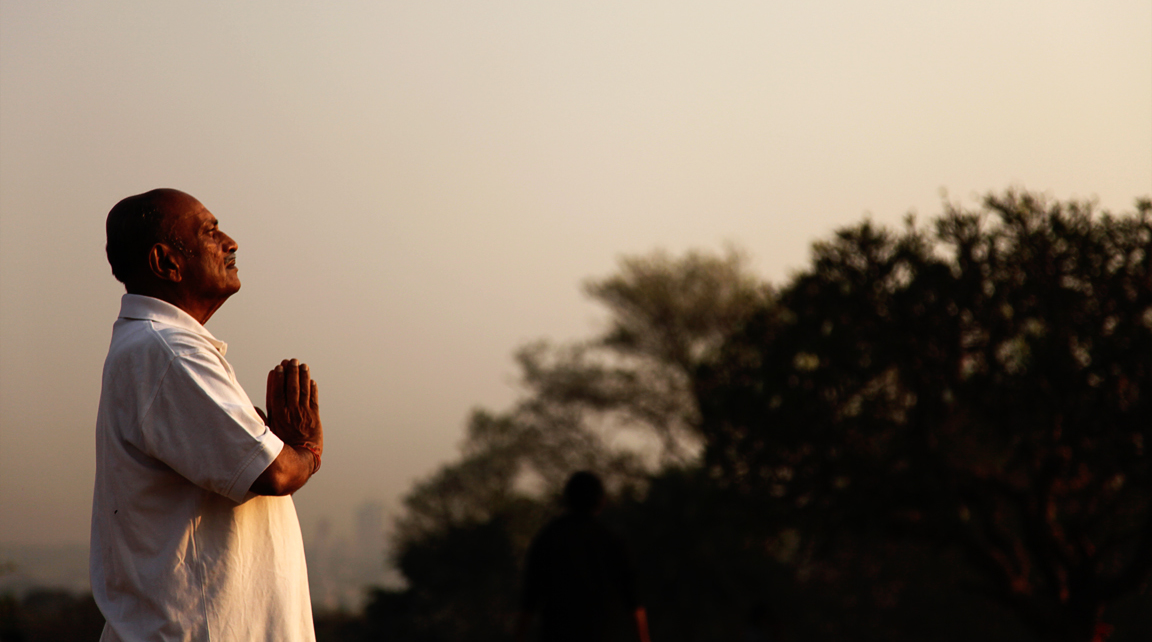
Along with murtis, Hindus use nature and aniconic symbols for deities. The lingam (left) symbolises Shiva and Parvati, the Tulasi plant in a square base (centre) is symbolism for Vishnu, and sunrise (or rivers) are revered as aspects of the spiritual everywhere.

In Hinduism, deities and their icons may be hosted in a Hindu temple, within a home, or as an amulet. The worship performed by Hindus is known by several regional names, such as Puja. This practice in front of a murti may be elaborate in large temples, or be a simple song or mantra muttered in home, or offering made to sunrise or river or symbolic an icon of a deity. Archaeological evidence of deity worship in Hindu temples trace Puja rituals to Gupta Empire era (c. 4th century CE). In Hindu temples, various pujas may be performed daily at various times of the day; in other temples, it may be occasional.

The Puja practice is structured as an act of welcoming, hosting, and honouring the deity of one's choice as one's honoured guest, and remembering the spiritual and emotional significance the deity represents to the devotee. Jan Gonda, as well as Diana L. Eck, states that a typical Puja involves one or more of 16 steps (Shodasha Upachara) traceable to ancient times: the deity is invited as a guest, the devotee hosts and takes care of the deity as an honoured guest, praise (hymns) with Dhupa or Aarti along with food (Naivedhya) is offered to the deity, after an expression of love and respect the host takes leave, and with affection expresses goodbye to the deity. The worship practice may also involve reflecting on spiritual questions, with image serving as support for such meditation.

Deity worship (Bhakti), visiting temples, and Puja rites are not mandatory and are optional in Hinduism; it is the choice of a Hindu, it may be a routine daily affair for some Hindus, periodic ritual or infrequent for some. Worship practices in Hinduism are as diverse as its traditions, and a Hindu can choose to be polytheistic, pantheistic, monotheistic, monistic, agnostic, atheistic, or humanist.

Devotees engage with deities in more personalised relationships. Ramanuja differentiates between three types of devotees: power-seekers, liberation-seekers, and those seeking love and communion with the deity. While all three are considered dharmic, they are not equally significant in terms of liberation. Power-seekers pursue goals for overall benefit, while liberation-seekers seek unity with the divine. The highest form of devotion is characterised by selfless love for the divine.

== Examples ==
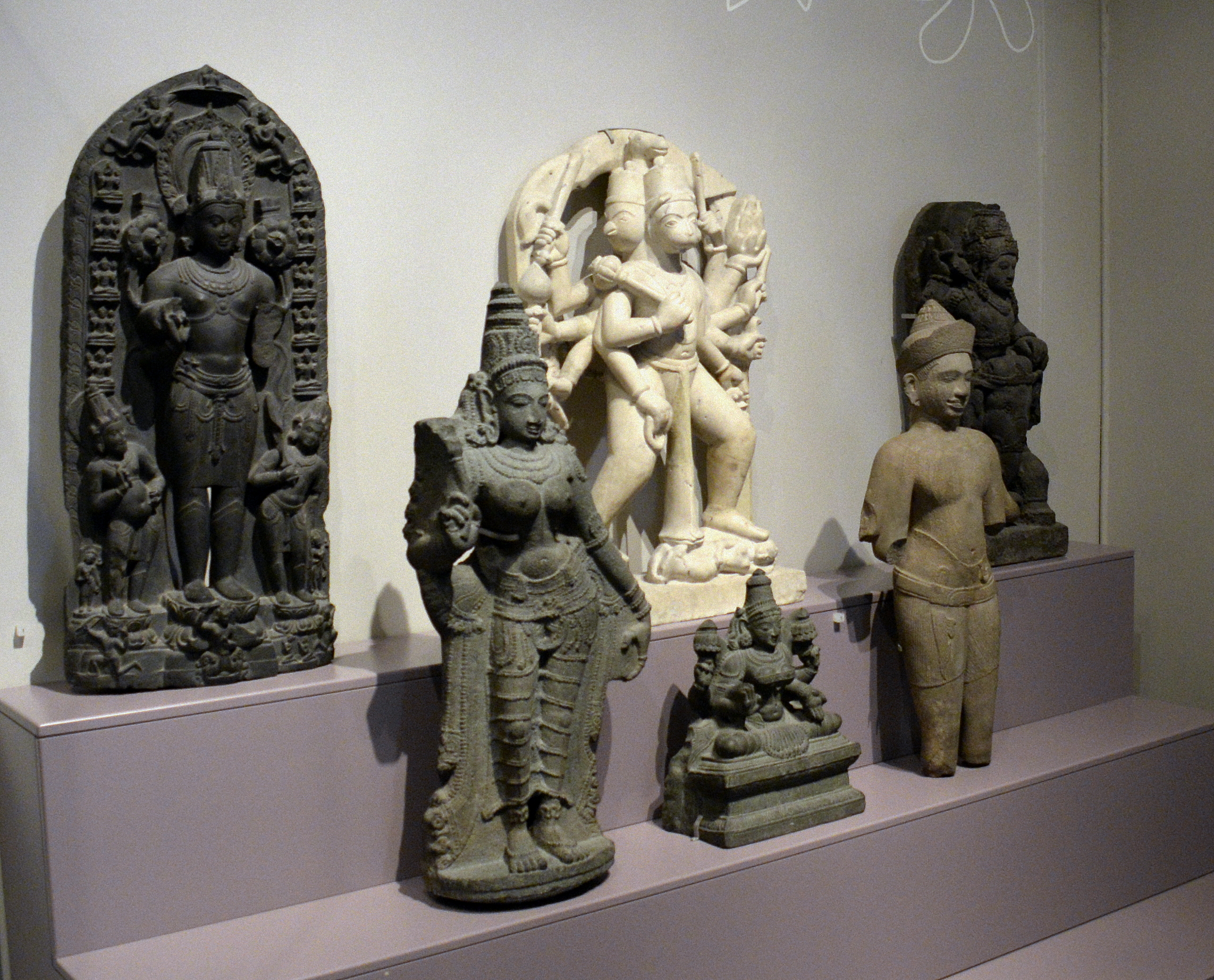
Six Hinduism deities. Surya, Parvati, Hanuman, Lakshmi, Vishnu, and Indra. All of these statues came from India, except Vishnu (from the Thai-Cambodian border). Various eras. National Museum of Scotland, Edinburgh

Major deities have inspired a vast genre of literature such as the Puranas and Agama texts as well their own Hindu traditions, but with shared mythology, ritual grammar, theosophy, axiology and polycentrism. Vishnu and his avatars are at the foundation of Vaishnavism, Shiva for Shaivism, Devi for Shaktism, and some Hindu traditions such as Smarta traditions who revere multiple major deities (five) as henotheistic manifestations of Brahman (absolute metaphysical Reality).

While there are diverse deities in Hinduism, states Lawrence, "Exclusivism – which maintains that only one's own deity is real" is rare in Hinduism. Julius Lipner, and other scholars, state that pluralism and "polycentrism" – where other deities are recognised and revered by members of different "denominations", has been the Hindu ethos and way of life.

=== Trimurti and Tridevi ===
The concept of Triad (or Trimurti, Trinity) makes a relatively late appearance in Hindu literature, or in the second half of 1st millennium BCE. The idea of triad, playing three roles in the cosmic affairs, is typically associated with Brahma, Vishnu and Shiva (also called Mahesh); however, this is not the only triad in Hindu literature. Other triads include Tridevi, of three goddesses – Lakshmi, Saraswati and Parvati in the text Devi Mahatmya, in the Shakta tradition, which further assert that Devi is the Brahman (Ultimate Reality) and it is her energy that empowers Brahma, Vishnu and Shiva. The other triads, formulated as deities in ancient Indian literature, include Sun (creator), Air (sustainer) and Fire (destroyer); Prana (creator), Food (sustainer) and Time (destroyer). These triads, states Jan Gonda, are in some mythologies grouped together without forming a Trinity, and in other times represented as equal, a unity and manifestations of one Brahman. In the Puranas, for example, this idea of threefold "hypostatization" is expressed as follows,

They [Brahma, Vishnu, Shiva] exist through each other, and uphold each other; they are parts of one another; they subsist through one another; they are not for a moment separated; they never abandon one another.

— Vayu Purana, 5.17, Translated by Jan Gonda

The triad appears in Maitrayaniya Upanishad, for the first time in recognised roles known ever since, where they are deployed to present the concept of three Guṇa – the innate nature, tendencies and inner forces found within every being and everything, whose balance transform and keeps changing the individual and the world. It is in the medieval Puranic texts, Trimurti concepts appears in various context, from rituals to spiritual concepts. The Bhagavad Gita, in verses 9.18, 10.21-23 and 11.15, asserts that the triad or trinity is manifestation of one Brahman, which Krishna affirms himself to be. However, suggests Bailey, the mythology of triad is "not the influence nor the most important one" in Hindu traditions, rather the ideologies and spiritual concepts develop on their own foundations. The triad, with Brahma creating, Vishnu preserving and Shiva destroying, balances the functioning of the whole universe.

=== Avatars of Hindu deities ===
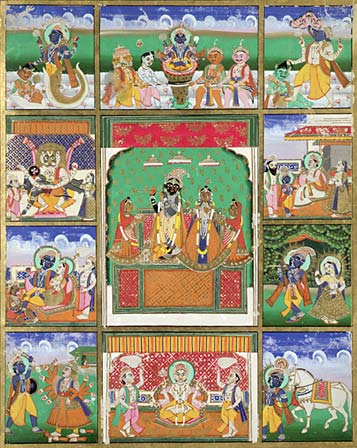
The ten avatars of Vishnu, (Clockwise, from top left) Matsya, Kurma, Varaha, Narasimha, Vamana, Krishna, Kalki, Buddha, Parshurama, Rama and Narasimha, (in centre) Radha and Krishna. Painting currently in Victoria and Albert Museum.

Hindu mythology has nurtured the concept of the avatar (avatāra), which represents the descent of a deity on earth. This concept is commonly translated as "incarnation", and is an "appearance" or "manifestation".

The concept of the avatar is most developed in Vaishnavism tradition, and associated with Vishnu, particularly with Rama and Krishna. Vishnu takes numerous avatars in Hindu mythology. He becomes female, during the Samudra Manthana, in the form of Mohini, to resolve a conflict between the devas and the asuras. His male avatars include Matsya, Kurma, Varaha, Narasimha, Vamana, Parashurama, Rama, Krishna, Buddha, and Kalki. In some lists, Balarama replaces the Buddha. Various texts, particularly the Bhagavad Gita, discuss the idea of an avatar of Vishnu appearing to restore the cosmic balance whenever the power of evil becomes excessive and causes persistent oppression in the world.

In Shaktism traditions, the concept appears in its legends as the various manifestations of Devi, the divine-mother principle in Hinduism. The avatars of Devi or Parvati include Durga and Kali, who are particularly revered in the eastern states of India, as well as Tantra traditions. Twenty-one avatars of Shiva are also described in Shaivism texts, but unlike Vaishnava traditions, Shaiva traditions focus directly on Shiva rather than the avatar concept.

=== Major regional and pan-Indian Hindu deities ===
Name	Other Names	Avatārs or Associated Deities	Geography	Image	Early illustrative art
Vishnu	Nārāyana, Venkateshwara, Jagannatha, Dattatreya, Hari, Other names of Rama and Krishna	Matsya, Kurma, Varaha, Narasimha, Vamana, Parashurama, Rama, Krishna, Kalki, Vithoba, Perumal, Balarama, Mohini, Buddha, Hayagriva	India, Nepal, Sri Lanka, Indonesia		2nd century BCE
Shiva	Mahādeva, Pashupati, Tripurantaka, Vishvanatha, Dakshinamurti, Nilakantha, Kālāntaka, Rudra, Nataraja, Sadashiva, Dattatreya	Bhairava, Veerabhadra, Batara Guru (Indonesia) Achalanatha (Japan)	India, Nepal, Sri Lanka, China		1st century BCE
Brahmā	Adi Prajāpati, Virinci, Vaidyanatha, Vacpati, Varishtadeva, Kamalaja, Srashta, Karta, Dhata	Bonten (Japan), Phra Phrom (Thailand)	India, Nepal, Sri Lanka, Southeast Asia		6th century CE
Indra	Devendra, Sakra, Mahendra, Amarendra, Sahasraksha, Sachipathi, Devaraja, Narendra, Rajendra, Purandhar, Parjanya, Surendra, Vendhan		India, Nepal, Cambodia, Thailand, Indonesia, Southeast Asia		
Ganesha	Ganapati, Vināyaka, Lambodara, Gajānana	Kangiten (Japan)	India, Nepal, Sri Lanka		7th century CE
Kārtikeya	Skanda, Murugan, Mangala, Kumara, Subrahmanya, Shanmukha		India, Sri Lanka, Malaysia, Nepal		2nd century BCE
Pārvati	Uma, Devi, Gauri, Durga, Kāli, Annapurna	Umahi (烏摩妃, Japan)	India, Nepal, Sri Lanka		5th century CE
Lakshmi	Sridevi, Bhargavi, Kamalāsanā, Padmavati, Chanchala	Sita, Radha, Rukmini, Kisshōten (Japan); Dewi Sri (Indonesia); Nang Kwak (Thailand)	India, Nepal, Sri Lanka		1st century BCE
Saraswati	Vāgishvari, Vīnāpāni, Sharada	Benzaiten (Japan), Biàncáitiān (China), Thurathadi (Myanmar), Suratsawadi (Thailand)	India, Nepal, Java, Bali, Sri Lanka		10th century CE
Durgā	Pārvati, Kāli, Mahishāsuramardini	Betari Durga (Indonesia)	India, Nepal, Sri Lanka, Bangladesh		8th century CE
Kāli	Durga, Parvati		India, Nepal, Sri Lanka, Bangladesh		9th century CE
Mariamman	Durga, Parvati		India (mostly in South India), Southeast Asia, Sri Lanka		10th century CE
Harihara (Half Vishnu - Half Shiva)	Shankaranarayana		India, Sri Lanka, Nepal		6th century CE
Ardhanārīshvara (Half Shiva - Half Parvati)			India, Nepal, Sri Lanka		1st century CE
Hanuman	Ramdhooth, Anjaneya, Maruti, Bajarangabali, Sankatamochana, Pavanasuta		India, Nepal, Sri Lanka		11th century CE

== See also ==
- Hindu denominations
- Hindu iconography
- Hindu mythology
- Puranas
- List of Hindu deities
- Rigvedic deities
