= IVS =

IVS is an abbreviation that can mean: Incredible Value Services

== Organizations ==
- Indus Valley School of Art and Architecture, Karachi, Pakistan
- International Vedanta Society, an Advaita Vedantic organization based in India
- International Voluntary Service, an international volunteering organisation based in the United Kingdom.
- International Voluntary Services, a private international volunteer organization
- NV Ingenieurskantoor voor Scheepsbouw, a dummy company set up after World War I in order to maintain and develop German submarine know-how
- International Viola Society, an international organization dedicated to players of the viola

== Biology and medicine ==
- Intervening sequence, a nucleotide sequence within a gene that is removed by RNA splicing while the final mature RNA product of a gene is being generated
- Interventricular septum, a part of the heart
- Intravaginal slingplasty

== Other ==
- International Valuation Standards, technical and ethical standards for the conduct of valuations
- Indus Valley Script, short strings of symbols associated with the Indus Valley Civilization
- Ideographic Variation Selectors or Ideographic Variation Sequence, variation selector for, or variation sequence of, Ideographic characters in Unicode
