= List of Hindu organisations =

Hinduism is practiced and preached by many Hindu organisations, each of which follows the variants and perspectives of all or particular philosophy propagated and transferred through generations by saints. It is a peaceful religion. Hinduism may be more of a custom or tradition of that part of the world which the great epics of Hinduism are supposed to depict. Hinduism is based on the Vedas, some of which are humanity's oldest inscriptions on life and spirituality. They differ on how to achieve life's ultimate goal – Atma Jnana or self-realization. Devotees can choose any path depending on their individual natures.

This is a list of notable organisations related to Hinduism, Hindu nationalism and Hindutva.

== List ==
- Akhil Bharatiya Akhara Parishad
- American Meditation Institute
- Anbukkodimakkal Thirucchabai
- Arsha Vidya Gurukulam
- Art of Living Foundation
  - The Art of Living International Center
- Arya Samaj
  - Arya Pratinidhi Sabha of Fiji
  - D.A.V. College Managing Committee
  - Gurukul Kangri University
- Bhakti Marga
- Bharat Sevashram Sangha
- Bihar School of Yoga
- Bochasanwasi Akshar Purushottam Swaminarayan Sanstha
  - BAPS Charities
- Brahma Kumaris
- Chinmaya Mission
- Devaswom boards in Kerala
- Divine Life Society
- Divine Light Mission
- Gita Press
- Hindus for Human Rights
- Hanuman Foundation
- Himalayan Institute of Yoga Science and Philosophy
- Hindu Council UK
- Hindu Council of Russia
- Hindu Forum of Britain
- The Hindu Group
- Hindu Religious and Charitable Endowments Department (Tamil Nadu)
- HINDRAF (Malaysia)
- Hindu Yuva Vahini
- ISKCON
  - Bhaktivedanta Book Trust
  - Bhaktivedanta Hospital
  - Food Yoga International
- International Swaminarayan Satsang Mandal
- International Swaminarayan Satsang Organisation
  - ISSO Seva
- International Vedanta Society
- Isha Foundation
- Jagadguru Kripalu Parishat
- Jagadguru Kripaluji Yog
- Kanchi Kamakoti Peetham
- Mahanam Sampraday
- Malaysia Hindudharma Mamandram
- Mata Amritanandamayi Math
- Narnarayan Dev Yuvak Mandal
- National Council of Hindu Temples (UK)
- Nikhil Manipuri Mahasabha
- Nilachala Saraswata Sangha
- Pakistan Hindu Council
- Pakistan Hindu Panchayat
- Parisada Hindu Dharma Indonesia
- Patanjali Yogpeeth
- Radha Soami Satsang Beas
- Radha Soami Satsang Sabha
- Radha Swami Satsang, Dinod
- Ramakrishna Mission
  - Ramakrishna Math
  - Ramakrishna-Vivekananda Center
  - Vedanta Society of New York
  - Swami Vivekananda Yoga Anusandhana Samsthana
- Rashtriya Swayamsevak Sangh (Sangh Parivar)
  - Akhil Bharatiya Vidyarthi Parishad
  - Bharat Vikas Parishad
  - Bhartiya Gau Raksha Dal
  - Bharatiya Kisan Sangh
  - Bharatiya Mazdoor Sangh
  - Ekal Vidyalaya
  - Hindu Aikya Vedi
  - Hindu American Foundation
  - Hindu Jagran Manch
  - Hindu Janajagruti Samiti
  - Hindu Munnani
  - Hindu Samhati
  - Hindu Sena
  - National Hindu Students' Forum (UK)
  - Vishva Hindu Parishad
    - Bajrang Dal
    - Durga Vahini
    - Hindu Students Council
- Saiva Siddhanta Church
- Sanatan Dharma Maha Sabha (Trinidad and Tobago)
- Sanatan Sanstha
- Santhigiri Ashram
- Sathya Sai Organization
- Satsang (Deoghar)
- Satsang Ashram
- School of Philosophy and Economic Science
- Science of Identity Foundation
- Science of Spirituality (a.k.a. Sawan Kirpal Ruhani Mission)
- Self-Realization Fellowship
  - Yogoda Satsanga Society of India
- Shree Swaminarayan Gurukul Rajkot Sansthan
- Sri Chaitanya Saraswat Math
- Society of Abidance in Truth
- Sree Narayana Dharma Paripalana Yogam
  - Alwaye Advaita Ashram
  - Sree Narayana Trust
  - List of Sree Narayana Institutions
- Sri Aurobindo Ashram
  - Auroville Foundation
  - Sri Aurobindo International School, Hyderabad
- Sri Ramana Ashram
- Sri Sri Radha Govindaji Trust
- Sringeri Sharada Peetham
- Swaminarayan Mandir Vasna Sanstha
- Tulsi Peeth Seva Nyas
- Vishwa Madhwa Maha Parishat
- Vishwa Nirmala Dharma
- World Vaisnava Association

== Defunct organisations ==
- Hindu Maha Sabha (Fiji)
- Manav Dharma Sabha
- Paramahansa Mandali
- Prarthana Samaj
- Tattwabodhini Sabha
- Theosophical Society of the Arya Samaj
- Trust Deed of Brahmo Sabha

== See also ==
- Lists of Hindu temples
