= Shiva Advaita =

Shaivite school of philosophy from Southern India

- Samkhya: Kapila
- Yoga: Patanjali
- Vaisheshika: Kaṇāda, Prashastapada
- Secular: Valluvar

Shiva Advaita (Devanagari:शिवाद्वैत, Tamil: சிவாத்வைதம், Śivādvaitam, Kannada: ಶಿವಾದ್ವೈತ, Śivādvaita), also known as Śiva Viśiṣṭādvaita or Shaivite qualified nondualism, refers to Śrīkaṇṭha Śivācārya's (dated 11th-15th century CE) Southern India Shaivite commentary on the Brahma Sutras, which considers Shiva supreme, and to Appayya's 16th century CE commentary on Śrīkaṇṭha Śivācārya's stance.

== Origins ==
Śrīkaṇṭha Śivācārya (also known as Nīlakaṇṭha Śivācārya) composed the Srikanta Bhashyam, a commentary on the Brahma Sutras, which became known as Śivādvaita. The time frame of Śrīkaṇṭha's work is not exactly known, but it is argued to fall somewhere between the 11th and 11 century, with the 14th to 15th century being more likely, according to Duquette. (Note: Kasivasi Senthinatha Iyer places it in the 7th century, arguing that it appeared before all the Bhashyams like Shankara, Ramanuja, and Madhva.) Sri Appayya Dikshita (16th century CE) contributed further to Shiva Advaita by expounding Śrīkaṇṭha's philosophy in his Sivarka Mani Dipika.

== Tenets ==
The theory of Śivadvaita resembles very closely Ramanuja's Viśiṣṭādvaita non-dualism doctrine, (Note: Compared to the Smārta tradition of Advaita, which regards Shiva as a manifestation of saguṇa Brahman ultimately dissolving into the impersonal nirguṇa Brahman, Srikanta’s Shiva Advaita is more sectarian and theistic, emphasizing Shiva as the unique and supreme Parabrahman.) but differs in who is considered Supreme. While Ramanuja considers Vishnu to be supreme, Śrīkaṇṭha considers Shiva supreme. While Śrīkaṇṭha does not deny Nirguna Brahman, which is central to Advaita, he affirms the supremacy of Saguna Brahman, typical of qualified non-dualism. However, Appayya affirms a form of pure non-dualism, and recasts Śrīkaṇṭha's work in an effort to establish Shiva Advaita in his Śivādvaitanirṇaya.

== Sources ==
- Chaudhuri, Roma (1962). Doctrine Of Srikantha Vol 1&2. Institute of Oriental Learning.
- Dalal, Roshen (2014). "Shivadvaita". Hinduism: An Alphabetical Guide. Penguin Books. ISBN 9788184752779.
- Duquette, Jonathan (2016). "Reading Non-Dualism in Śivādvaita Vedānta: An Argument from the Śivādvaitanirṇaya in Light of the Śivārkamaṇidīpikā". Journal of Indian Philosophy. 44 (1): 67–79. doi:10.1007/s10781-014-9231-x. ISSN 0022-1791. JSTOR 44157294. S2CID 171076332.
- Johnson, W. J. (2009). A Dictionary of Hinduism. Oxford University Press. ISBN 978-0-19-861025-0 – via Oxford Reference.
- Kantha (1897). The Vedanta Sutras With SriKantha Bhashya. Translated by Mahadeva Sastri.
- Radhakrishna, Sarvepalli (1960). Brahma Sutra, The Philosophy of Spiritual Life.
- Ramesan, N. (1972). Sri Appayya Dikshita. Srimad Appayya Dikshitendra Granthavali Prakasana Samithi; [sole distributors: B. G. Paul, Madras. p. 67.
- Subramuniyaswami, Satguru Sivaya (2003). Merging with Śiva: Hinduism's contemporary metaphysics. Himalayan Academy Publications. ISBN 978-0-945497-99-8.
