= Ananda Yoga =

Hatha Yoga by Kriyananda

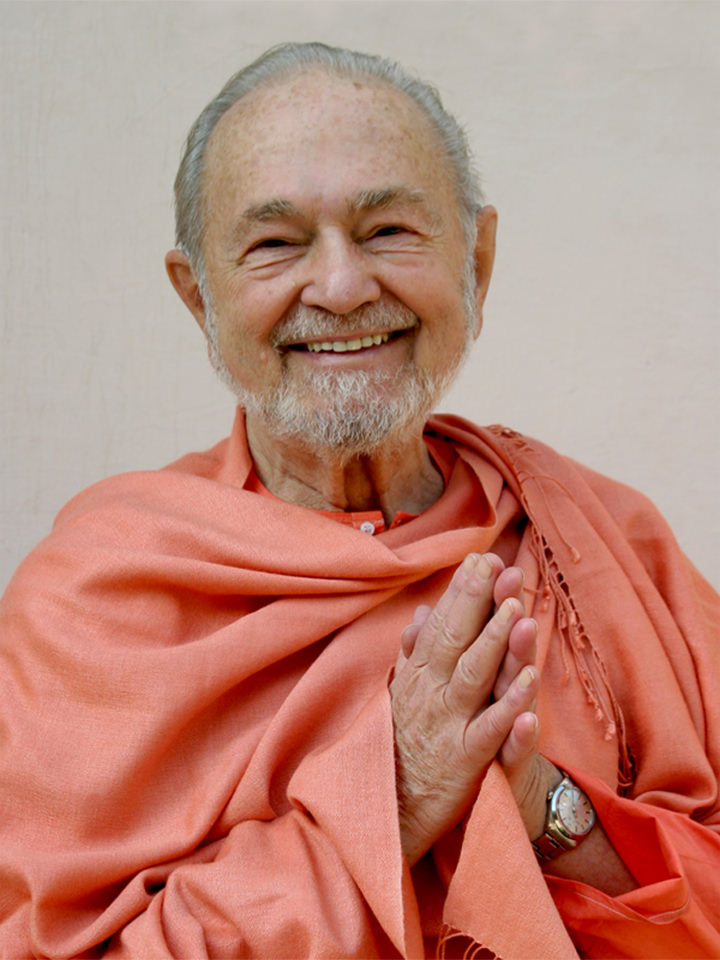
- Founder: Kriyananda

Practice emphases
- Inner awareness, energy control, affirmations, higher consciousness

Ananda Yoga, or Ananda Yoga for Higher Awareness is a system of Hatha Yoga established by Kriyananda, a Western disciple of Paramahansa Yogananda, and is based on Yogananda's Self-Realization Fellowship (SRF) and Yogoda Satsanga Society of India (YSS) teachings. Ananda Yoga emphasizes inner awareness; energy control; and the experience of each asana as a natural expression of a higher state of consciousness, which is enhanced by the use of affirmations.

== History ==
Ananda Yoga was established by Kriyananda taking from one of the oldest Hatha Yoga systems in the West. Its roots are the 1940s/1950s, when Kriyananda was with Self-Realization Fellowship, he was taught these postures by Yogananda. Yogananda, founder of SRF and YSS, asked Kriyananda (then Donald Walters) and other young monks, to demonstrate the postures for visiting guests, as well as for public events, such as the SRF "Lake Shrine Dedication." Kriyananda and other monks also posed for photos, for articles on the yoga postures in Yogananda's "Self-Realization Magazine." From 1965 Kriyananda through his own organization started to teach Ananda Yoga publicly in California. The director of Ananda Yoga, Gyandev Rich McCord, is a co-founder of Yoga Alliance and a member of its board of directors.

== Principles ==
Ananda Yoga uses asana and pranayama to awaken, experience, and control the subtle energies (prana) within the body, especially the energies of the chakras, supposed energy centres that are arranged along the spine. Its object is to use those energies to harmonize the body, uplift the mind, and above all to attune to higher levels of awareness. A unique feature of this system is the use of silent affirmations while in the asanas, as a means of working more consciously with the subtle energies to achieve this attunement. Ananda Yoga is a relatively inward experience, not an athletic practice. A main goal is to prepare for deep meditation, as Hatha Yoga is considered the physical branch of Raja Yoga in both the Hatha Yoga Pradipika and the Gheranda Samhita.

=== Sequence ===
In addition to controlling energy, Ananda Yoga also follows a set sequence of yoga classes.

The sequence begins with standing asanas to stimulate the flow of prana along the spine. This is followed by poses on the floor sitting and lying down. Floor poses end with spinal twists and stretches.

The sequence continues with inverted poses that direct energy to the chest, throat and brain; upper chakras. Then the penultimate practice involves shavasana for deep relaxation. Shavasana helps to turn your senses inward (pratyahara).

Last in the sequence, obviously, is meditation. Meditation gives aesthetic perfection to the spiritual nature of Ananda practice. Ananda Yoga implements the Hong-Sau meditation method, which is an ancient Sanskrit mantra that, when properly repeated and reiterated, evokes spiritual power. Meditation assimilates all the benefits gained from the previous steps and directs to the elevation of consciousness, stimulating Anandamaya Kosha to achieve inner bliss.

== Energization exercises ==
The "Energization Exercises", a vital part of Ananda Yoga, are Yogananda's contribution to yoga. He first developed them in 1916, within his organization then called Yogoda, which he changed to Self-Realization Fellowship / Yogoda Satsanga Society of India in the 1930s. He eventually expanded them into a set of 39 exercises. The goal is to tap into cosmic energy, recharging the whole body. Yogananda explains in his Autobiography of a Yogi: "Realizing that man's body is like an electric battery, I reasoned that it could be recharged with energy through the direct agency of the human will…. I therefore taught the Ranchi students my simple 'Yogoda' techniques by which the life force, centered in man’s medulla oblongata, can be consciously and instantly recharged from the unlimited supply of cosmic energy."
