= Tagera Ningwaphumang =

Goddess of the Limbu people

Tagera Ningwaphumang, sometimes Ningwaphuma, is the main traditional cultural goddess of Limbu community. She is often identified as the "Supreme Body of Knowledge" or the "Creator of the World. They worship this god in various festivities such as Chasok Tangnam. It is in Limbu language which translates as invisible god of spirit.
