= American Meditation Institute =

Yoga training organization, USA

The American Meditation Institute (AMI) was founded by Leonard Perlmutter (Ram Lev) and Jenness Cortez Perlmutter in 1996. The Perlmutters were influenced by Eknath Easwaran and Nisargadatta Maharaj; they were direct disciples of Swami Rama of the Himalaya Mountains, the man who, in laboratory conditions and under the observation of research scientists at the Menninger Clinic, demonstrated that blood pressure, heart rate, and the autonomic nervous system can be voluntarily controlled. These research demonstrations have been one of the major cornerstones of the mind-body movement since the 1970s.

AMI is located on 5 acres (2.0 ha) in the foothills of the Berkshire Mountains just east of Albany, New York. AMI offers a full range of education programs including a yoga therapist certification program, weekly classes, and weekend retreats on the practical application of yoga science as holistic mind-body medicine.

As a non-profit educational organization, the American Meditation Institute describes its mission as “to provide safe, effective practices for achieving optimal wellness and longevity for the general public, medical doctors and other healthcare professionals.” Courses include meditation, breathing, gentle yoga, nutrition, mind function optimization, chakra balancing techniques, kitchen yoga (food as medicine), Ayurveda, Tantra healing, the teachings of the Buddha, and a computer distance learning course on the psychology of the Bhagavad Gita.

In addition, the American Meditation Institute publishes a variety of media through AMI Publishers, including the magazine Transformation, the Journal of Yoga Science as Mind-Body Medicine, and books including The Heart and Science of Yoga: A Blueprint for Peace, Happiness and Freedom from Fear. This encyclopedic resource for experiencing the healing connection between mind, body, and spirit was the recipient of six major book awards during 2006 and 2007 including the Benjamin Franklin, ForeWord Magazine, Independent Publisher Book Awards, Eric Hoffer Awards and Nautilus Awards. The book has been endorsed by noted physicians Mehmet Oz, Dean Ornish, Bernie Siegel, and Larry Dossey.

In 2009, The American Meditation Institute hosted its First Annual Comprehensive Training in Holistic Mind-Body Medicine course for healthcare practitioners. The course is acknowledged to be the first and only such complete yoga science curriculum in the United States to offer continuing medical education credits for physicians registered nurses and other health care practitioners.
