= Julius J. Lipner =

Julius Lipner (born 11 August 1946), who is of Indo-Czech origin, was Professor of Hinduism and the Comparative Study of Religion at the University of Cambridge.

== Early life ==
Lipner was born and brought up in India, for the most part in West Bengal. After his schooling in India, he obtained a Licentiate in Theology (summa cum laude) in the Pontifical Athenaeum (now Jnana Deepa Vidyapith) in Pune, and then spent two years studying for an M.A. in Indian and Western philosophy at Jadavpur University in Kolkata/Calcutta. He did doctoral research under philosopher H.D. Lewis in the philosophy of the Self with reference to Indian and Western thought, at King's College, University of London.

== Career ==
Lipner obtained his PhD in 1974, and then spent a little over a year as lecturer in Indian religion at the University of Birmingham, before being appointed to Cambridge University in 1975, from where he retired as Professor of Hinduism and the Comparative Study of Religion at the end of 2013.

Lipner is a Fellow Emeritus and former Vice-President of Clare Hall, a postgraduate College of the University of Cambridge. In 2008 he became a Fellow of the British Academy.

== Personal life ==
Lipner married his Bengali wife Anindita in 1971; they have two children and six grandchildren.

== Publications ==
- The Face of Truth: a Study of Meaning and Metaphysics in the Vedantic Theology of Ramanuja, 1976; sole author;
- Hindu Ethics: Purity, Abortion and Euthanasia, 1989; co-author;
- Brahmabandhab Upadhyay: The Life and Thought of a Revolutionary, 1999; sole author – this book was given the award for the “Best Book in Hindu-Christian Studies 1997-1999” by The Society for Hindu-Christian Studies (affiliated to the American Academy of Religion);
- Anandamath, or The Sacred Brotherhood, Oxford University Press, 2005; sole translator/author; this book contains a full English translation of Bankim Chandra Chattopadhyay|Bankim Chatterji’s famous 19th-century Bengali novel, with an extensive Introduction and Critical Apparatus, and received the A.K. Ramanujan Book Prize for Translation awarded by The South Asia Council of the Association for Asian Studies in the USA;
- two editions of Hindus: their religious beliefs and practices, 1994 and 2010 (sole author), the second edition being a thoroughly revised and substantially enlarged version of the first
- Hindu Images and their Worship with special reference to Vaiṣṇavism: A Philosophical-Theological Inquiry, Routledge, 2017; sole author.
