= International Vedanta Society =

Hindu organisation

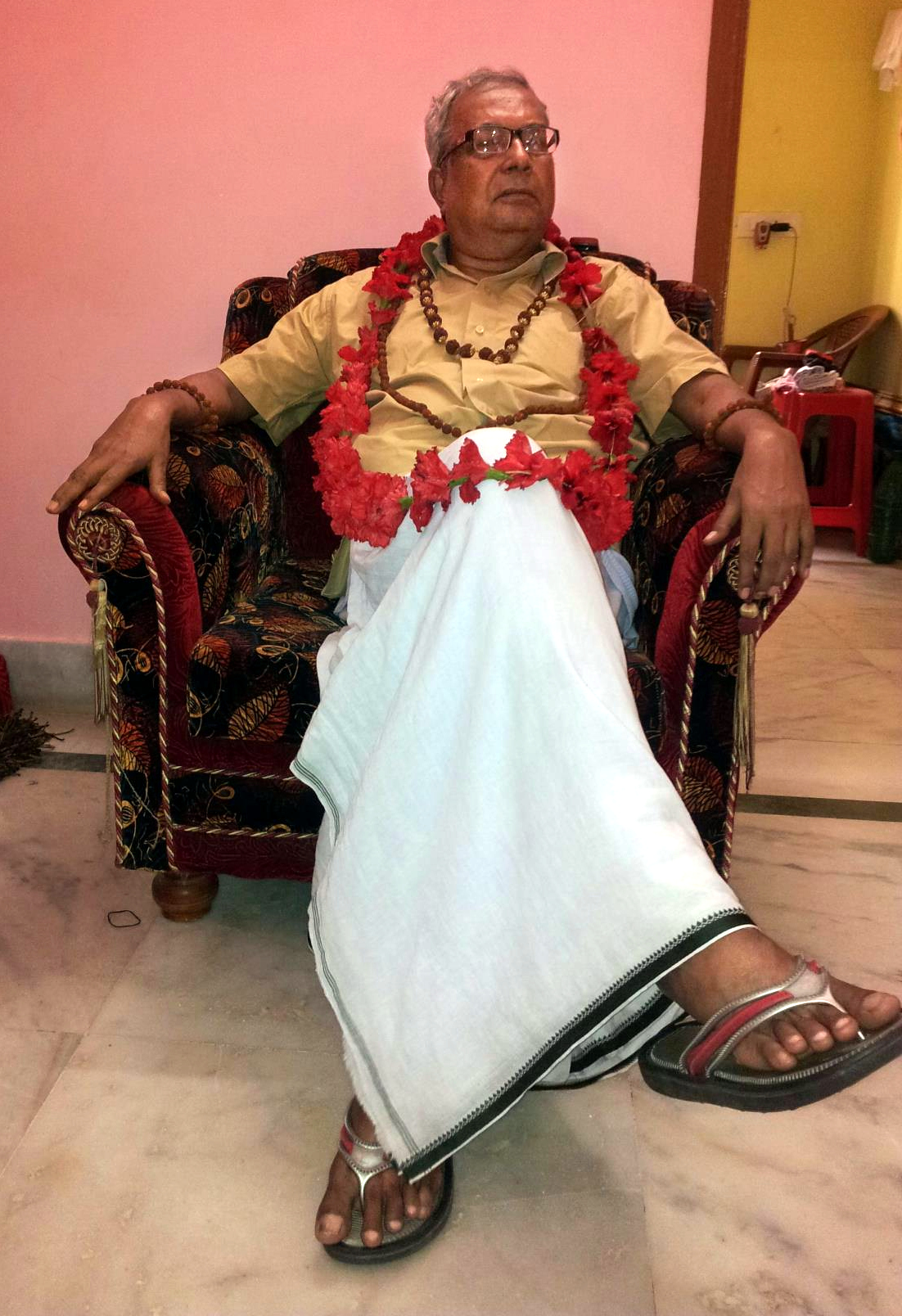
- Sri Sri Bhagavan - the founder and the core of the International Vedanta Society
- Founded: 1989
- Founder: Sri Bhagavan
- Type: Non-Profit Organization
- Purpose: Spirituality, Vedanta
- Region served: India, Netherlands, United States, United Kingdom, Spain, Malaysia, Singapore

The International Vedanta Society (or IVS) is a spiritual organization in India focused on Advaita Vedanta. It is based in Birati, West Bengal, India, and was founded on 19 November 1989 by Sri Bhagavan (1942–2023). Sri Bhagavan entered maha samadhi on 27 May 2023; his teachings continue to guide the society under its current president, Swami Keshavananda Puri.

== See also ==
- Ramakrishna Mission
- Vedanta Society
