= Saguna brahman =

Hindu philosophical concept

Saguna Brahman (lit. 'The Absolute with qualities') is a concept of ultimate reality in Hinduism.

== Vedanta ==
According to Dvaita and Vishistadvaita, Brahman is conceived as Saguna Brahman (personal deity) or Ishvara (Lord of the Universe) with infinite attributes, including form. In Dvaita, Saguna Brahman is distinct from individual souls and the material world. In Vishistadvaita, while Brahman is the supreme reality, the world and souls are its body or modes, making them integral to Brahman. Dvaita and Vishistadvaita consider Saguna Brahman as the ultimate reality and liberation (moksha) is attained only by the grace of God. Shankara (Advaita) distinguishes between Saguna Brahman (with qualities) and Nirguna Brahman (without qualities), with Saguna Brahman seen as illusory, and Nirguna Brahman as real.

== Other ==
Surya is regarded as Saguna Brahman by Saura (Hinduism), Vishnu is described as Saguna Brahman in Vaishnavism. Shakti (or Parvati, Durga, Kali, Mahalakshmi, or Gayatri) is seen as the Saguna Brahman in Shaktism and Shiva is the Saguna Brahman of Shaivism. Ganesha is seen as the Saguna Brahman as per Ganapatya Sect and Kartikeya in Kaumara Sect

== Bibliography ==
- Iannone, A. Pablo (2013). Dictionary of World Philosophy. Routledge. ISBN 9781134680443.
