= Trimurti =

Hindu concept of one god in three aspects

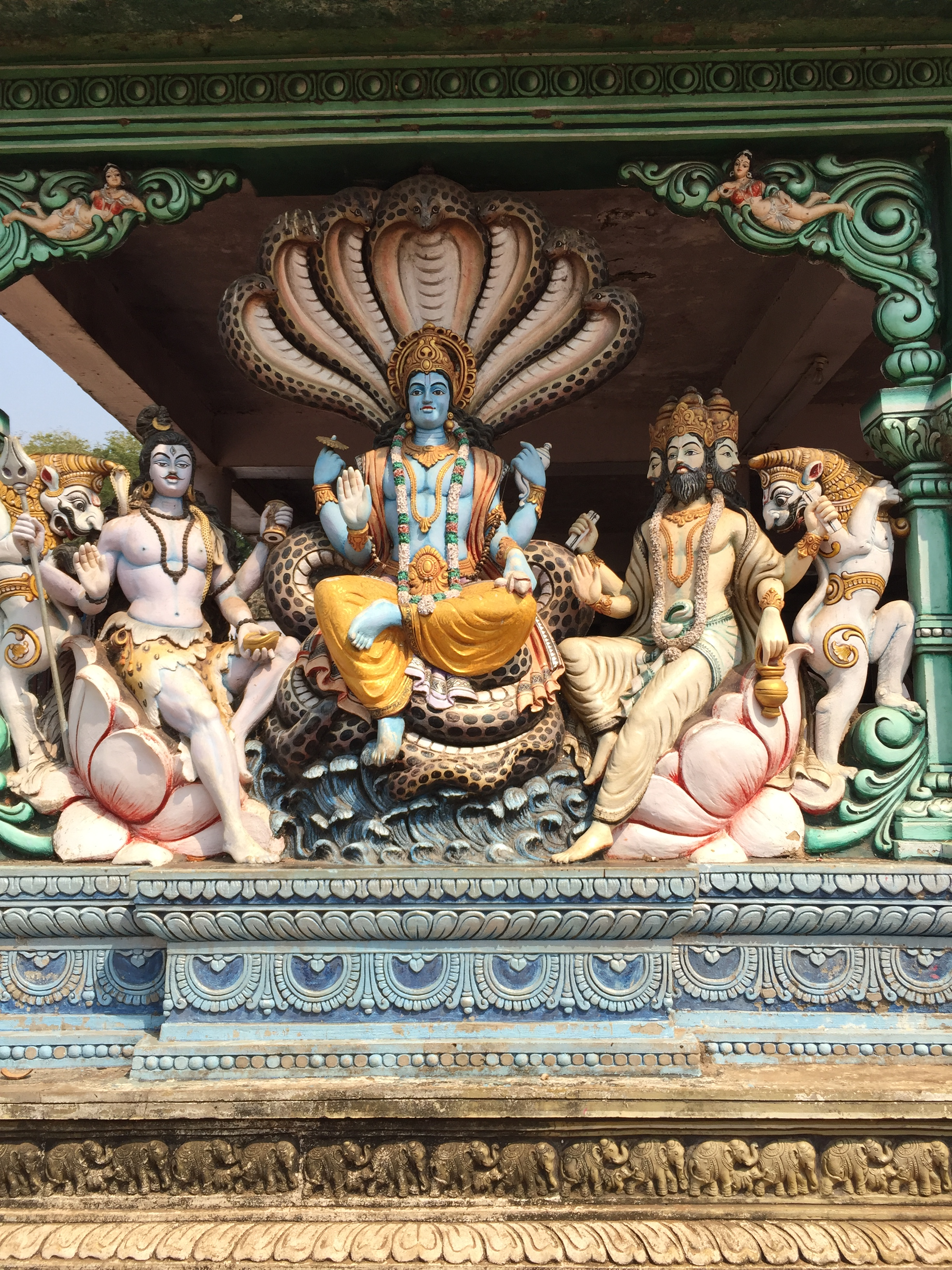
The Sculpture of Trimurti in Ugratara Temple

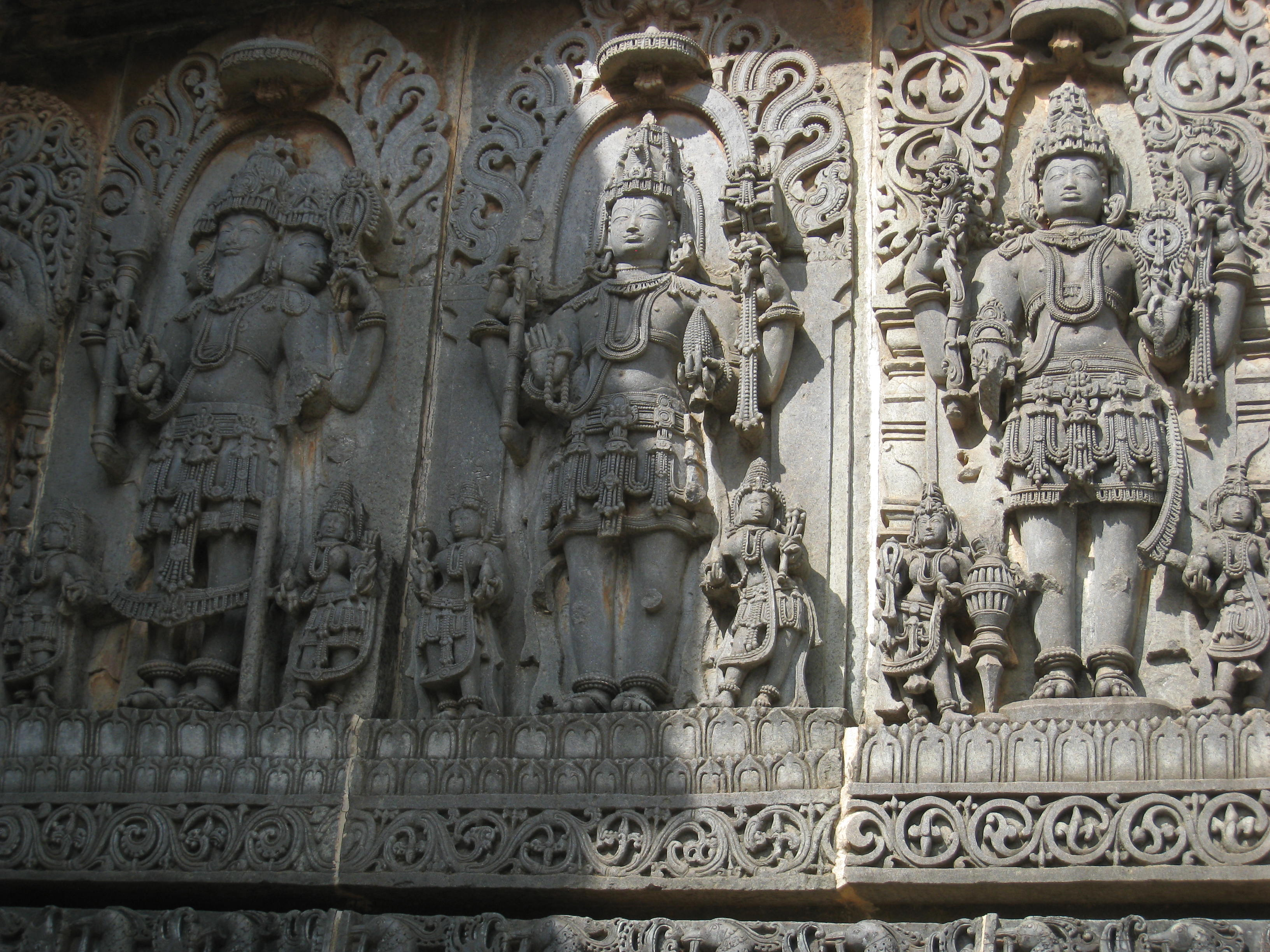
Trimurti relief at the Hoysaleswara temple in Halebidu

The Trimurti (Note: /trɪˈmʊərti/; Sanskrit: त्रिमूर्ति, romanized: trimūrti, lit. 'three forms' or 'trinity') is the triple deity of supreme divinity in Hinduism, in which the cosmic functions of creation, preservation, and destruction are personified as a triad of deities. Typically, the designations are that of Brahma the creator, Vishnu the preserver, and Shiva the destroyer. (Note: Brahma is Śvetāmbara (Sanskrit: श्वेताम्बर, lit. 'white-clad'), Maha Vishnu is Pitamber (पीताम्बर, Pītāmbara, 'yellow-laden') and Shiva is Vāgambara (वागम्बर, 'speech-clad'): "The Purāṇas" in Flood (2003), p. 139.)

The Tridevi is the trinity of goddess consorts for the Trimurti, or sometimes a feminine version of the Trimurti.

== Evolution ==
The Puranic period (4th–12th centuries CE) saw the rise of post-Vedic religion and the evolution of what R. C. Majumdar calls "synthetic Hinduism."

The following is a well-known section from the Vishnu Purana (1:2:66) that mentions Brahma, Vishnu, and Shiva together in a single verse, highlighting their roles within the cosmic functions of creation, preservation, and destruction:

rūpāṇi trīṇi tatraiva mūrttibheda-vibhāgataḥ
ajāmyekāmśam ātmānaṁ śiva-rūpeṇa tishthati
jagataḥ sthiti-samdhānaṁ samharanti yuge yuge
trayaṁ brahma-mahā-viṣṇu-māheśvara-iti smṛtam
Translation: In this way, the one supreme entity divides itself into three forms—Brahma, Vishnu, and Mahesh (Shiva)—taking on different aspects. It creates, preserves, and destroys the universe in various ages.

This period lacked homogeneity and included orthodox Vedic Brahmanism, remnants of older Vedic faith traditions, along with different sectarian religions—notably Shaivism, Vaishnavism, and Shaktism—that were within the orthodox fold yet still formed distinct entities. One of the important traits of this period is a spirit of harmony between orthodox and sectarian forms.

Regarding this spirit of reconciliation, R. C. Majumdar writes that:

Its most notable expression is to be found in the theological conception of the Trimūrti, in other words, the manifestation of the supreme God in three forms of Brahmā, Viṣṇu, and Śiva ... But the attempt cannot be regarded as a great success, for Brahmā never gained an ascendancy comparable to that of Śiva or Viṣṇu, and the different sects often conceived the Trimūrti as really the three manifestations of their own sectarian god, whom they regarded as Brahman or [the] Absolute.

The identification of Brahma, Vishnu, and Shiva as one being is strongly emphasized in the Kūrma Purāṇa. In verse 1:6, Brahman is worshipped as the Trimurti. Verse 1:9 especially inculcates the unity of the three gods, and verse 1:26 relates to the same theme. Noting Western interest in the idea of a trinity, historian Arthur Llewellyn Basham explains the background of the Trimurti as follows:

There must be some doubt as to whether the Hindu tradition has ever recognized Brahma as the Supreme Deity in the way that Visnu and Siva have been conceived of and worshiped.

The concept of Trimurti is also present in the Maitri Upanishad 5:2, wherein the three gods are explained as three of God's supreme forms:

Brahma, Rudra, and Vishnu are called the supreme forms of him. His portion of darkness is Rudra. His portion of passion is Brahma. His portion of purity is Visnu".

== Views within Hinduism ==
The word ‘trimurti’ means ‘three forms’. In the trimurti, Brahma is the creator, Vishnu is the preserver and Shiva is the destroyer.

Remember the difference between Brahman (with an ‘n’), which refers to Ultimate Reality, and Brahma (with no ‘n’), which refers to the creator god.

=== Shaivism ===
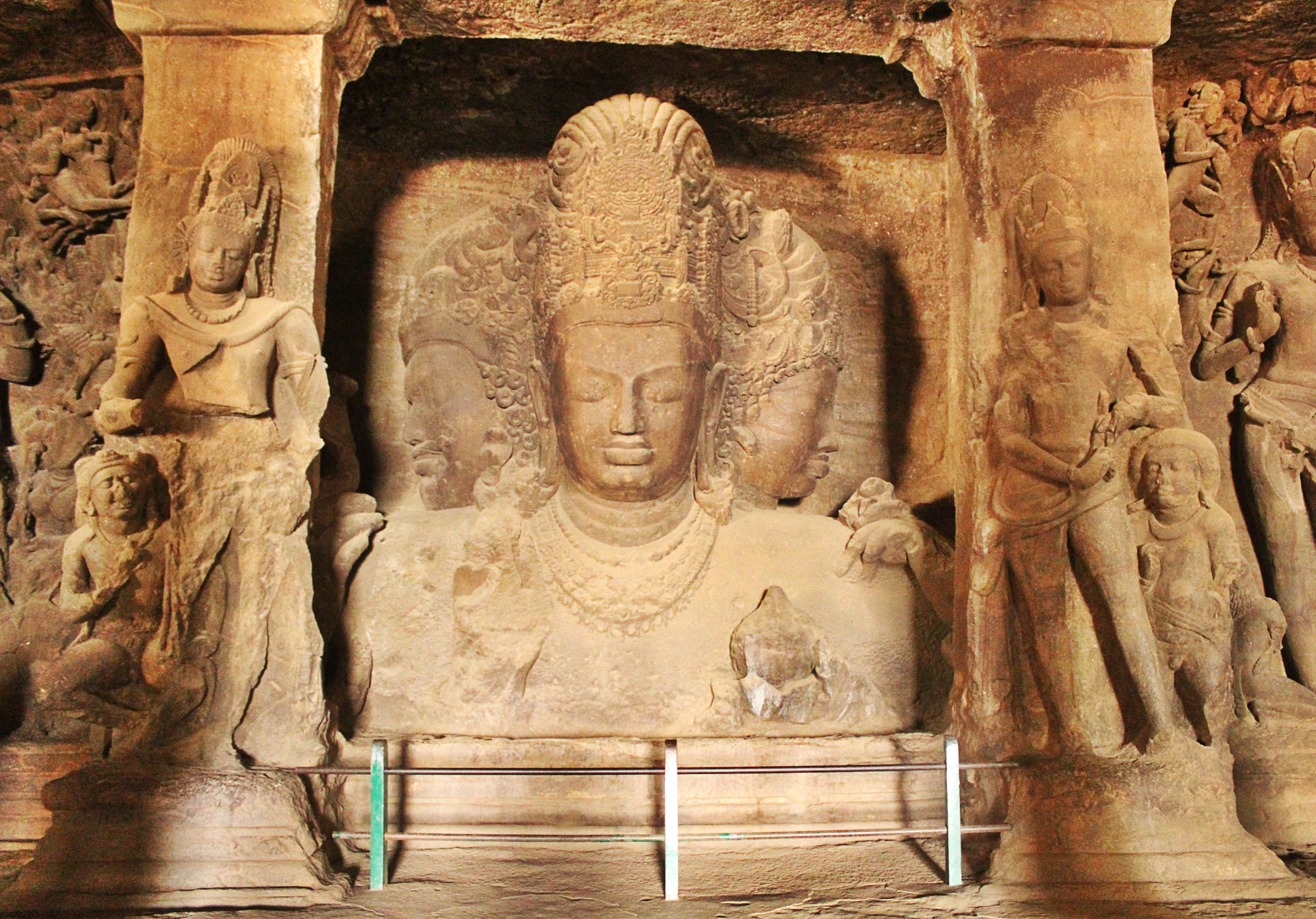
Trimurti as Sadasiva at the Elephanta Caves

Shaivites hold that, according to Shaiva Agama, Shiva performs five actions: creation, preservation, dissolution, grace, and illusion. Respectively, these first three actions are associated with Shiva as Sadyojata (akin to Brahma), Vamadeva (akin to Vishnu) and Aghora (akin to Rudra).

Thus, Brahma, Vishnu and Rudra are not deities different from Shiva, but rather are forms of Shiva. As Brahma/Sadyojata, Shiva creates. As Vishnu/Vamadeva, Shiva preserves. As Rudra/Aghora, he dissolves. This stands in contrast to the idea that Shiva is the "God of destruction." Shiva is the supreme God and performs all actions, of which destruction is only but one. Ergo, the Trimurti is a form of Shiva Himself for Shaivas.

Shaivites believe that Shiva is the Supreme, who assumes various critical roles and assumes appropriate names and forms, and also stands transcending all these. A prominent visual example of a Shaivism version of the Trimurti is the Trimurti Sadashiva sculpture in the Elephanta Caves on Gharapuri Island.

=== Vaishnavism ===
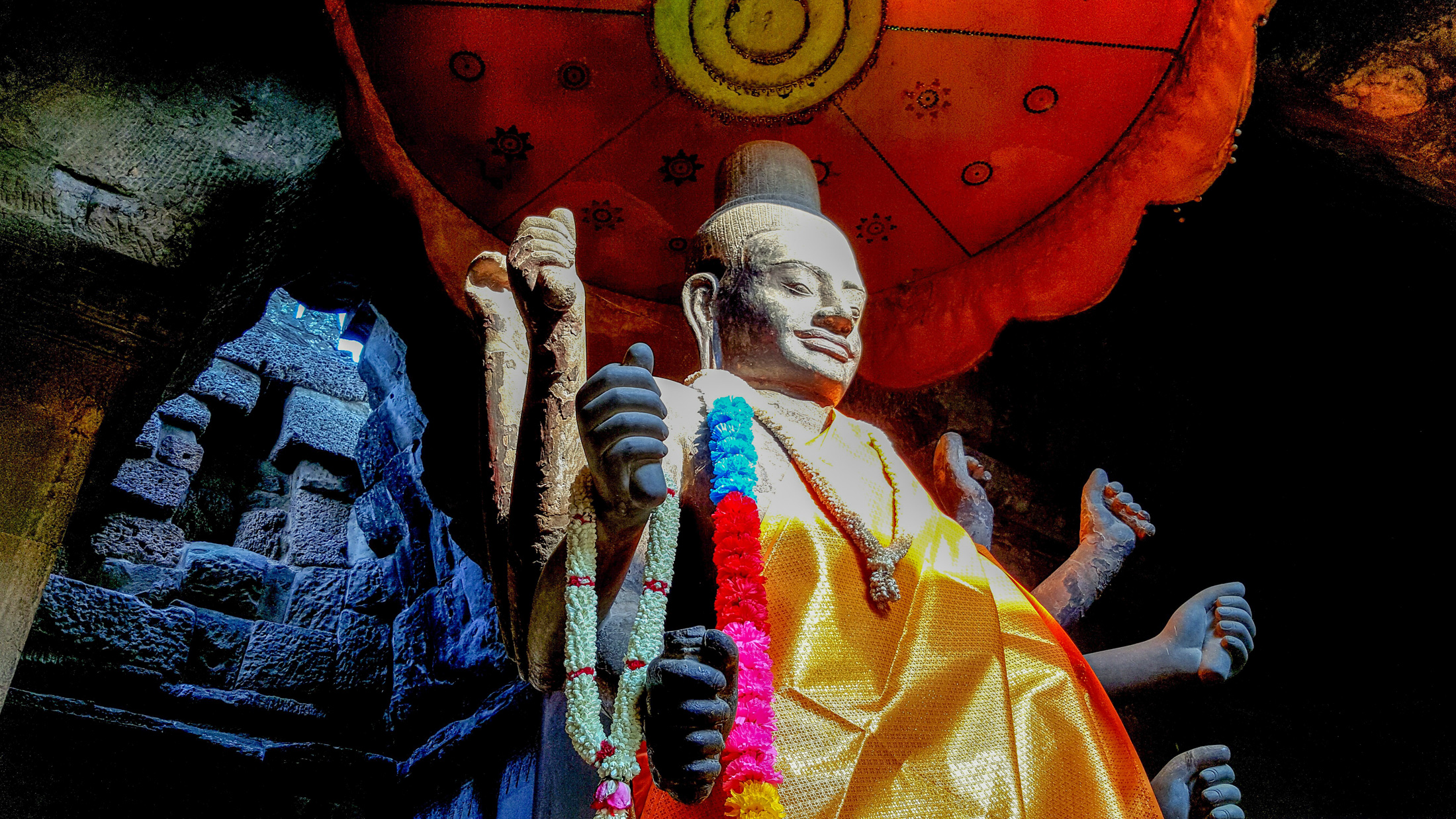
Statue of Vishnu, the principal deity worshipped at Angkor Wat, Cambodia

Despite the fact that the Vishnu Purana describes that Vishnu manifests as Brahma in order to create and as Rudra (Shiva) in order to destroy, Vaishnavism generally does not acknowledge the Trimurti concept. Instead, they believe in the avataras of Vishnu like Narasimha, Rama, Krishna, and so forth.

They also believe that Shiva and Brahma are both forms of Vishnu. For example, the Dvaita school holds Vishnu alone to be the Supreme God, with Shiva subordinate, and interprets the Puranas differently. For example, Vijayindra Tîrtha, a Dvaita scholar interprets the 18 puranas differently. He interprets the Vaishnavite puranas as satvic and Shaivite puranas as tamasic and that only satvic puranas are considered to be authoritative.

The tradition of Sri Vaishnavism in the south holds that all major deities that are hailed in the Puranas are in fact forms of Vishnu, and that the scriptures are dedicated to him alone.

=== Shaktism ===
The female-centric Shaktidharma denomination assigns the eminent roles of the three forms (Trimurti) of Supreme Divinity not to masculine gods but instead to feminine goddesses: Mahasarasvati (Creatrix), Mahalaxmi (Preservatrix), and Mahakali (Destructrix). This feminine version of the Trimurti is called Tridevi ("three goddesses"). The masculine gods (Brahma, Vishnu, Shiva) are then relegated as auxiliary agents of the supreme feminine Tridevi.

=== Smartism ===
Smartism is a denomination of Hinduism that places emphasis on a group of five deities rather than just a single deity. The "worship of the five forms" (pañcāyatana pūjā) system, which was popularized by the ninth-century philosopher Śankarācārya among orthodox Brahmins of the Smārta tradition, invokes the five deities Shiva, Vishnu, Brahma, Shakti and Surya. Śankarācārya later added Kartikeya to these five, making six total.

This reformed system was promoted by Śankarācārya primarily to unite the principal deities of the six major sects on an equal status. The monistic philosophy preached by Śankarācārya made it possible to choose one of these as a preferred principal deity and at the same time worship the other four deities as different forms of the same all-pervading Brahman.

== See also ==
- Ahuric triad
- Dattatreya
- Moirai
- Sanxing
- Three Pure Ones
- Trikaya
- Triple deities
- Historical Vishnuism
