= Banalinga =

Form of lingam from the Narmada basin

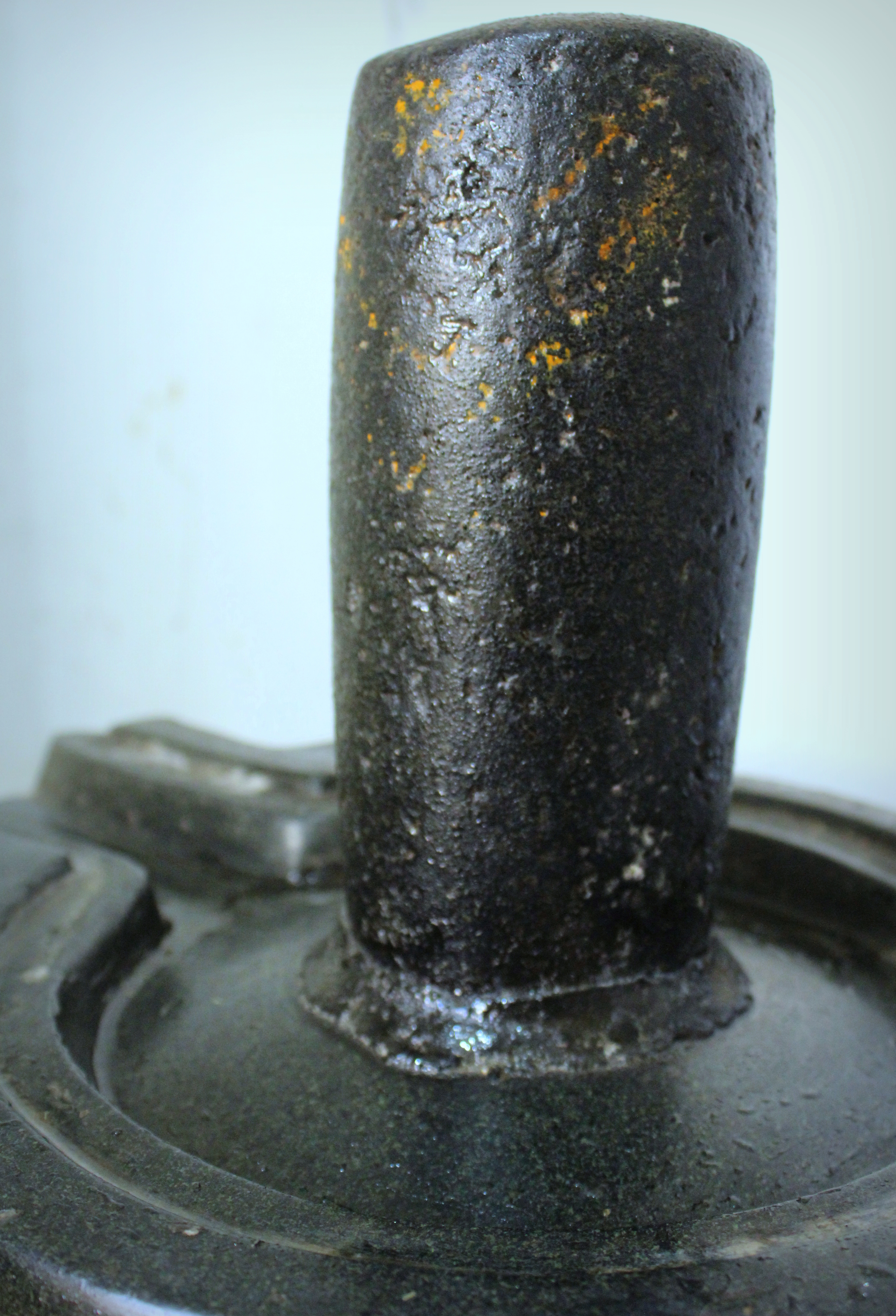
A large Banalinga recovered from Saraswati River at Andul in c.1650 AD.

A Banalinga is a stone of a type found in the riverbed of parts of the Narmada River in Madhya Pradesh state, India, formed by natural processes of erosion into a shape resembling a lingam, an aniconic form of the Hindu deity Shiva. They are smooth ellipsoid stones that are regarded as manifestations of the deity, based on either the scriptures or cultural traditions among the Hindus, particularly of the Shaivas and Smarta Brahmins.

The banalinga is also called the Svayambhu (self-born) linga as it is natural rather than artificial.

However, the popularity of the stones has severely depleted the natural supply, and the stones offered commercially today are largely produced artificially.

Banalinga stones are quite strong and tend to have a hardness of 7 on the Mohs scale. Stones regarded and treated as banalinga are found naturally in other rivers and natural contexts, but only erratically.

== Significance ==
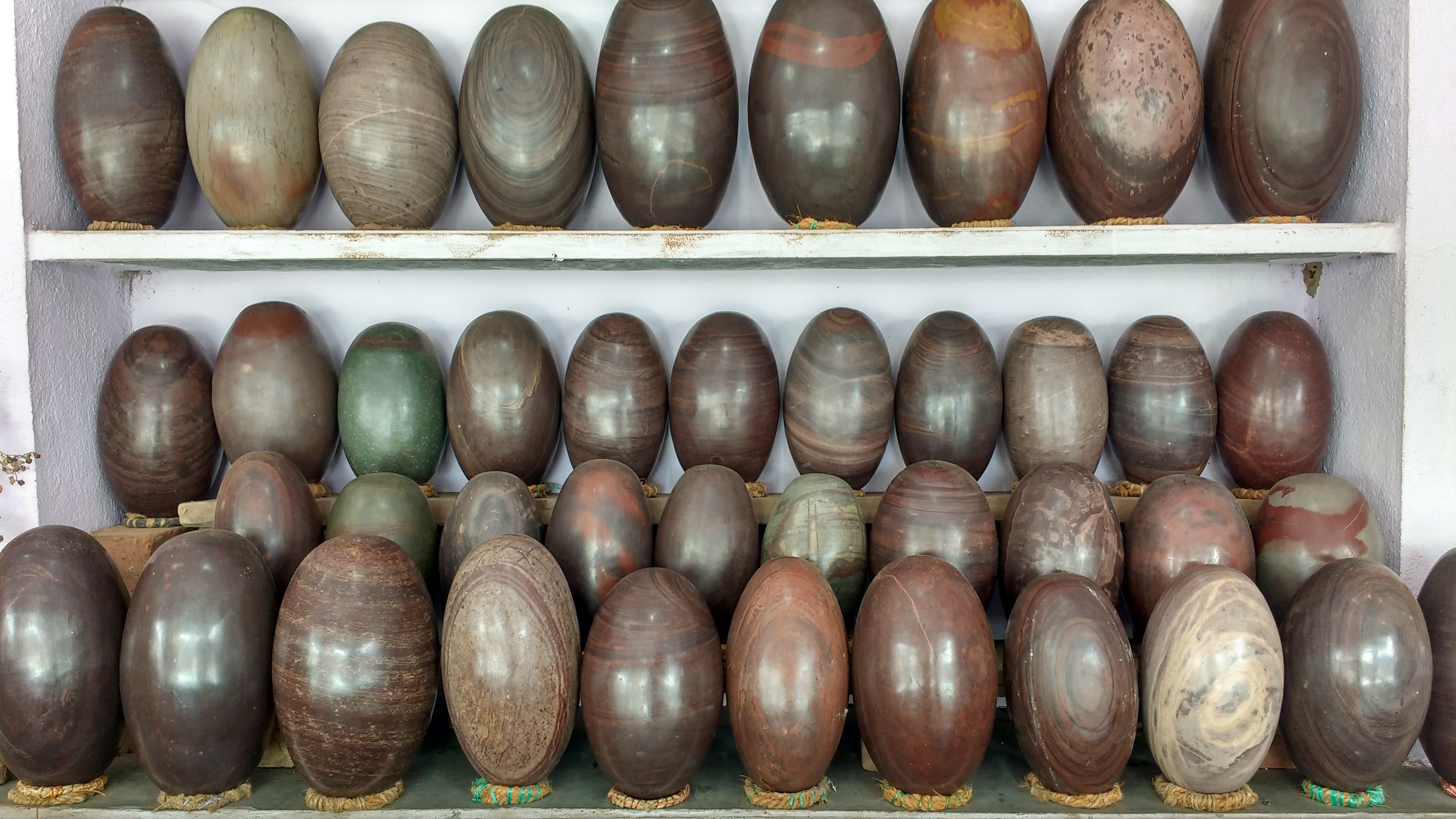
Banalinga stacked on a shelf in a shop near Omkareshwar temple which is situated along Narmada River.

The Narmada River also called the Rewa, derived its name from its leaping motion (from the root rev through its rocky bed) where the Banalinga stones are found, has been mentioned by Ptolemy and the author of the Periplus. The Ramayana, the Mahabharata and Puranas refer to it frequently. The Rewa Khand of Vayu Purana and the Rewa Khand of Skanda Purana are entirely devoted to the story of the birth and the importance of the Narmada River. It is said to have sprung from the body of Lord Shiva. It was created in the form of a lovely damsel who enamoured gods and was hence named by the Lord as Narmada- delight giving. It is, therefore, often called Shankari, i.e., daughter of Lord Shankar (Shiva).

All the pebbles rolling on its bed are said to take the shape of His emblem with the saying Narmada Ke Kanker utte Sanka (which is a popular saying in the Hindi belt of India) which means that ‘pebble stones of Narmada gets a personified form of Shiva’. Thus, these lingam shaped stones, called Banalinga, are sought after for daily worship by the Hindus.

The Bannalinga, as a divine aniconic symbol for worship, is held in reverence by the Shaivaites and Smartha Brahmins, to the same extent as the Saligrama Sila (murti) is held in reverence by the Vaishnavites.

Further, a sighting of the Narmada River is considered equivalent to a bath in the Ganges. At numerous places along its course there are temples, and fairs are held. Pilgrims perform Pradakshina (circumambulation), i.e., walking along the southern bank from its source to the mouth and going back along the northern bank. The performance is regarded as being of the highest religious efficacy.

Three kinds of lingas are described in the Brihat Vaivarta Purana (Hindu scripture). These three lingas, are called SvAmbhuva [Self-existing], Banalinga [got from a certain river] and Sailalinga [made of stone] and these are also respectively called Vyakta, Avyakta, and VyaktAvyakta. It is said that Vyakta gives salvation, the Avyakta gives [worldly] happiness, and VyaktAvyakta gives both happiness and salvation.

People belonging to various Hindu sects such as Shaiva, Kapalik, Gosavi, Virashaiva, etc., use various lingas – earthen (parthivlinga), lingas in a silver box worn around the neck (kanthasthalinga), lingas of crystal glass (sphatiklinga), banalingas, a five stringed linga (panchasutri), stone lingas (pashanlinga), etc.

== Panchayatana ==
Banalinga is a part of the fivefold family of deities (Panchayatana). The five Hindu deities (Shiva, Vishnu, Devi, Surya and Ganesha) are the embodiment of 5 bhutas/tatwas worshipped in formless stones, which are obtained from the 5 rivers as indicated in the table below. Panchayatana form of worship is said to have been introduced by Adi Shankara, the 8th century C.E Hindu philosopher, to enable a person to worship his Ishta devata (adored or desired deity), to address each sectarian form of worship and thus bring about tolerance among all sects. Depending on the tradition followed by Smarta households, one of these deities is kept in the centre facing East direction and the other four are arranged in four corners surrounding it, as indicated in the diagram below; all the deities are worshipped with equal fervor and devotion.

Name of Deity	Bhuta(Tatwa)	Name of the Stone (Sila)	Name of the River	Name of the State where found in India	Names of flowers and leaves used for worship
Ganesha	Akasha(Space)	Red Sonabhadra	Sone	Bihar	Lotus and Bandook flowers
Surya(Sun)	Agni/Teja(Fire)	Crystal	Vallam	Tamil Nadu (Tanjavur)	Bandook flower and plantain tree
Vishnu	Prithivi(Earth)	Saligrama	Gandaki	Nepal	Tulsi (basil), Ashwatha, and Amalaki leaves. Marigold, Punnaga, and yellow flowers
Shiva	Apu(Water)	Banalinga	Narmada (Omkara-kunda)	Madhya Pradesh	Golden shower tree Flower, Bel leaves and Amalaki leaves. Akund (Calotropis gigantea), Crown flower Nagalingam flower
Ambika(Devi)	Vayu (Air)	Swarna Mukhi (Rekha Shila)	Swarnamukhi	Andhra Pradesh	Red flowers – Hibiscus or China rose and Neem leaves

People generally sit facing East, while placing the deities/devatas and performing the Panchayatana pooja in the following order:

Center	North East	South East	South West	North West
Ganapati	Vishnu	Shiva	Surya (Sun)	Durga
Surya (Sun)	Shiva	Ganapati	Vishnu	Durga
Vishnu	Shiva	Ganapati	Surya (Sun)	Durga
Shiva	Vishnu	Surya (Sun)	Ganapati	Durga
Durga (Devi)	Vishnu	Shiva	Ganapati	Surya (Sun)

SHIVA NORTHEAST		DURGA NORTHWEST
	TATPURUSHA	
VAMADEVA	ISHANA VISHNU	AGHORA (RUDRA)
	SADYOJATA	
SOUTH EAST GANAPATI		SOUTH WEST SURYA

A layout for performing the Panchayatana Pooja [Puja]

In an additional form of worship called the Shanmata, also founded by Adi Shankara, six deities are worshipped; the sixth deity, added to the five deities of the Panchayatana Puja mentioned above, is Skanda, also known as Kartikeya and Murugan.

== Thanjavur Temple ==
The famous Thanjavur Brihadeeswarar Temple has one of the biggest Banalingas.

== See also ==
- Panchayatana puja
- Shanmata
- Chesil Beach
