= HKB =

HKB may refer to:

- Haken-Kelso-Bunz model, a theoretical model of motor coordination
- Halenadu Karnataka Brahmins, a Kannada-speaking Smartha Brahmin community
- Haus der Kultur und Bildung, a building in Neubrandenburg, Germany
- Healy Lake Airport, in Alaska, United States
- Hoysala Karnataka Brahmins, a Kannada-speaking Smartha Brahmin community
- Homi K. Bhabha, an Indian critical theorist
