= Joi =

Joi or JOI may refer to:

== People ==
- Jóhannes Ásbjörnsson (born 1979; nicknamed Jói), Icelandic TV and radio show host
- Joi (singer) (born 1971), American singer, songwriter, and record producer

=== Given name ===
- Joi Arcand (born 1982), nehiyaw photo-based artist
- Joi Barua, Indian singer and music composer
- Joi Cardwell (born 1967), American singer-songwriter, author, holistic health coach
- Joi Chua (born 1978), Singaporean female pop singer
- Joi Ito (born 1966), Japanese entrepreneur and venture capitalist
- Joi Lansing (1929–1972), American model, film and television actress, and nightclub singer
- Joi Srivastava (1930–2003), North Indian violinist of the Senia Gharana
- Joi Williams (born 1966), former head coach of the UCF Knights women's basketball team

=== Surname ===
- Marilyn Joi (born 1945), American actress

=== Fictional characters ===
- Joi, an AI character in Blade Runner 2049

== Other uses ==
- Joi (band), British alternative dub/dance music DJ team
- Joi (TV channel), an Italian Entertainment TV channel owned by Mediaset
- Joi Internet, a dial-up Internet service provider based in Atlanta, Georgia
- Joint Oceanographic Institutions (JOI), the operator of the Joint Oceanographic Institutes Deep Earth Sampling Project
- Jerk off instruction, a genre of pornography

== See also ==
- JO1, a Japanese boy band formed through the reality competition show Produce 101 Japan
- JO1 (disambiguation)
- Jol (disambiguation)
- Joy (disambiguation)
- Jois (surname)
- Jois, Austria
