= Jol =

Jol or JOL may refer to:

== People ==
- Cornelis Jol (1597–1641), Dutch corsair and admiral during the Eighty Years' War
- Dick Jol (born 1956), Dutch football referee
- Jutta Jol (1896–1981), German actress
- Martin Jol (born 1956), Dutch football manager and former player
- Jol Dantzig, American artist and musician

== Places ==
- Cherchell, Algeria; a town with the Roman Era name Jol
- Jol, Iran; a village
- Jolo Airport (IATA airport code JOL), Sulu, Philippines

== Events ==
- Jól (Iceland), the Christmas holiday season in Iceland
- Yule (jól), an ancient Germanic winter celebration

== Other uses ==
- Jol, a kind of embroidered Kilim flatweave rug for use as a horse saddle
- Jol (film), a 2001 Kazakhstani drama
- Journal of Luminescence, a peer-reviewed scientific journal

== See also ==
- JO1 (disambiguation)
- Joi (disambiguation)
