= Head of Shiva =

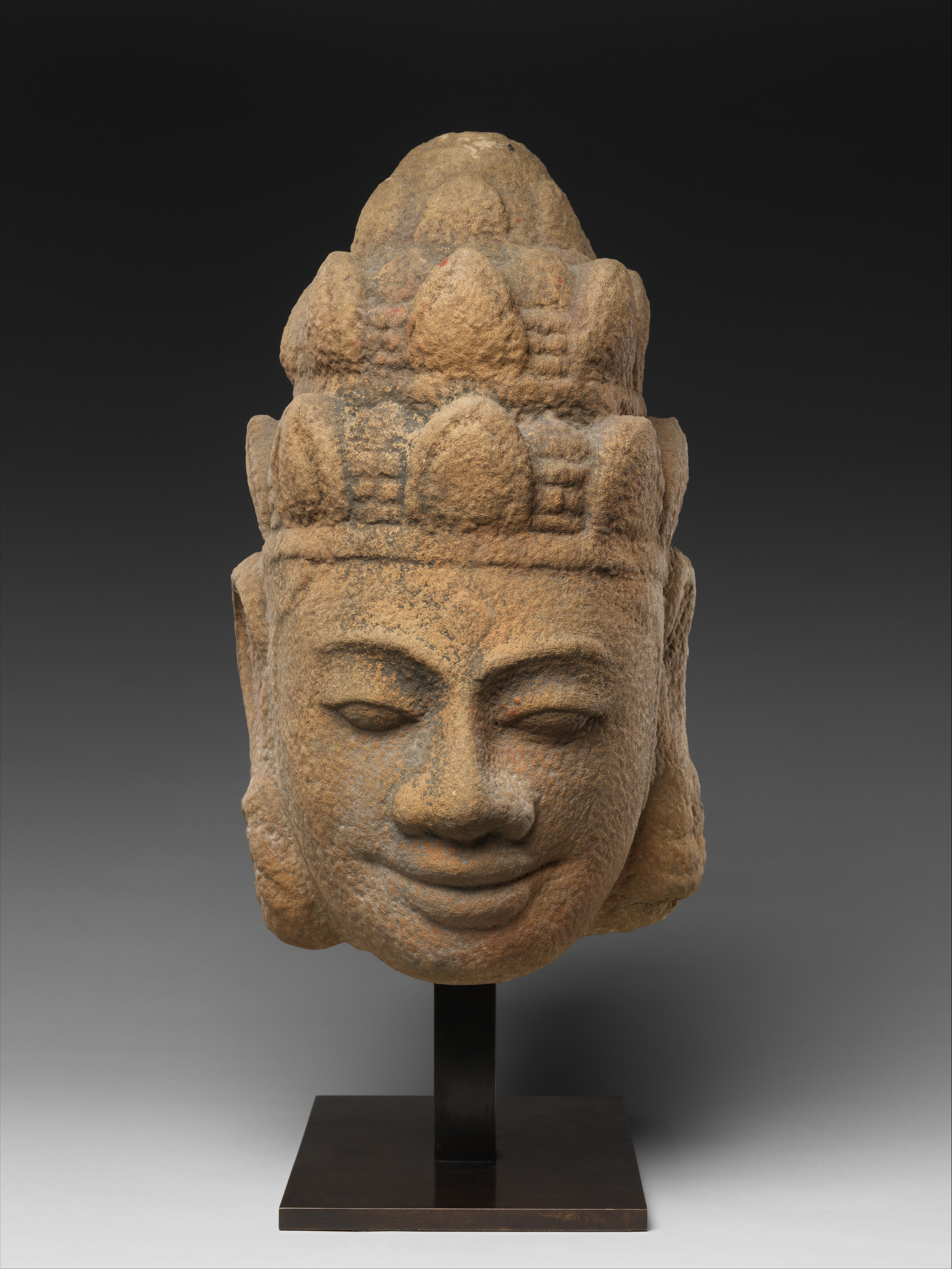
- Year: c. 10th century AD (Chams kingdom)
- Type: sculpture
- Medium: sandstone
- Subject: Shiva
- Dimensions: 40 cm × 21.9 cm × 44.5 cm (16 in × 8.6 in × 17.5 in)
- Location: Metropolitan Museum of Art, New York
- Accession: 2014.520

Head of Shiva is a statue of Shiva made of sandstone. This statue head was created during the 10th century AD in Vietnam. The statue measures 40 centimeters in height, 21.9 centimeters in width and 44.5 cm in length. Shiva is considered as one of the three major deities in Hinduism, others being Vishnu and Brahma. Collectively, Shiva, Vishnu and Brahma are called trimurti in Hinduism. These three deities are considered as the supreme deities and the creators of the universe in Hindu mythology. Sandstone sculptures of Shiva, like this one, are common in Hindu temple architecture during the Chams period of central and southern Vietnam.

== Description ==
Shiva is considered as one of the major deities in Hinduism. Together with Vishnu and Brahma, Shiva is called the "trimurti" or triad of gods. Shiva is described as both destruction deity and creator deity. Shiva is the most revered god of Indian people, evolved from the Vedic period. The sect of Hinduism, which considers Shiva as the supreme deity is called Shaivism. Goddess Parvati is the consort of Shiva. Shiva is considered as the supreme god and creator of the universe in Shaivism. It is mentioned in Hindu mythology that, origin, destruction and maintenance of the universe is associated with Shiva’s dance. The Shiva concept can be seen in several Buddhist traditions. After being absorbed into Buddhism, Shiva is considered as a saint deity living in a heavenly kingdom. This statue of Shiva, created during the 10th century AD, was found from Vietnam. It is belonging to the Chams kingdom period of Vietnam. The statue measures 40 centimeters in height, 21.9 centimeters in width and 44.5 centimeters. This statue was purchased by Metropolitan Museum of Art, New York City, United States in 2014. Shiva is wearing an ornate crown and depicted with a smile.

== Gallery ==
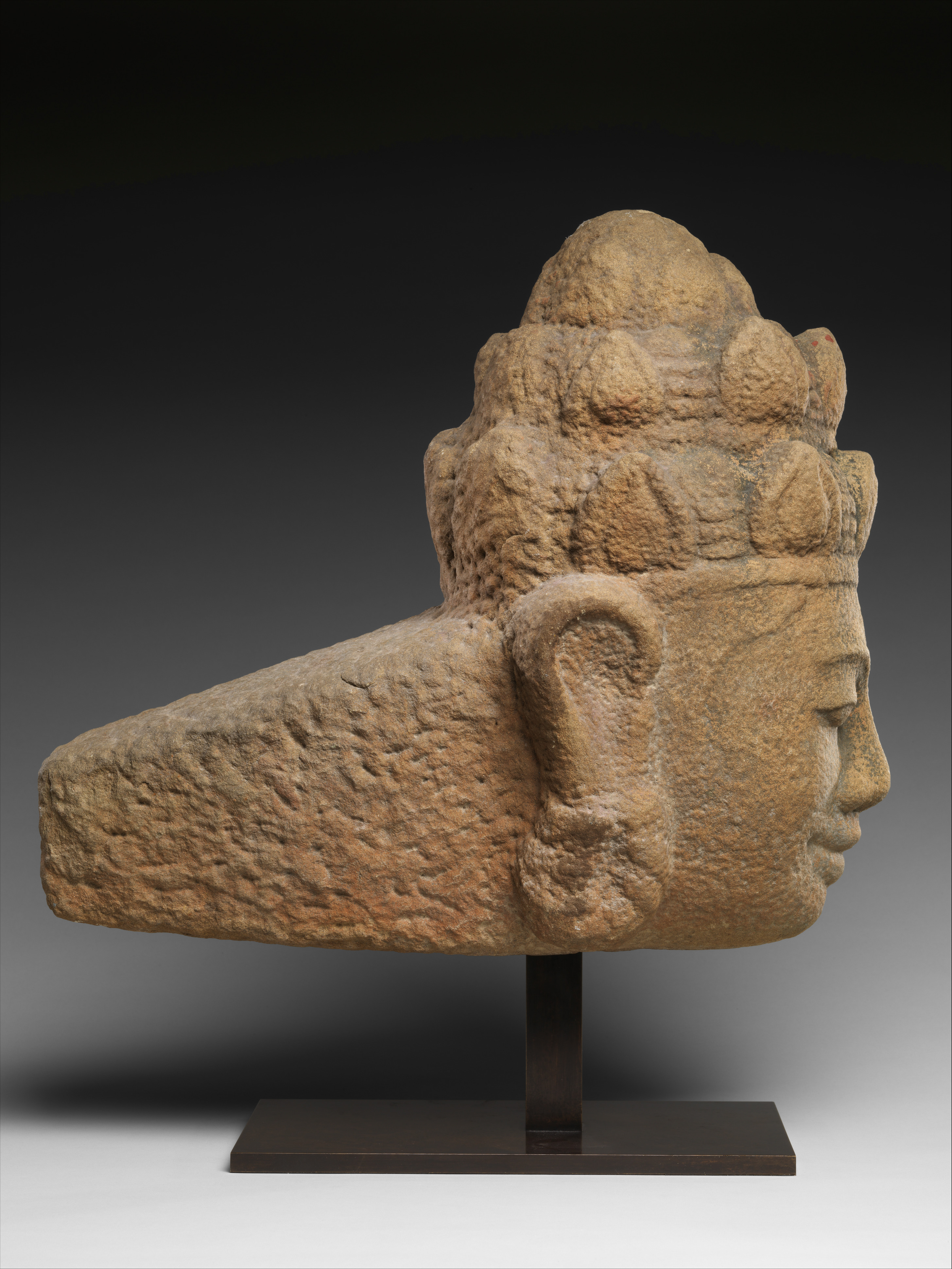
Head of Shiva, view from the left side

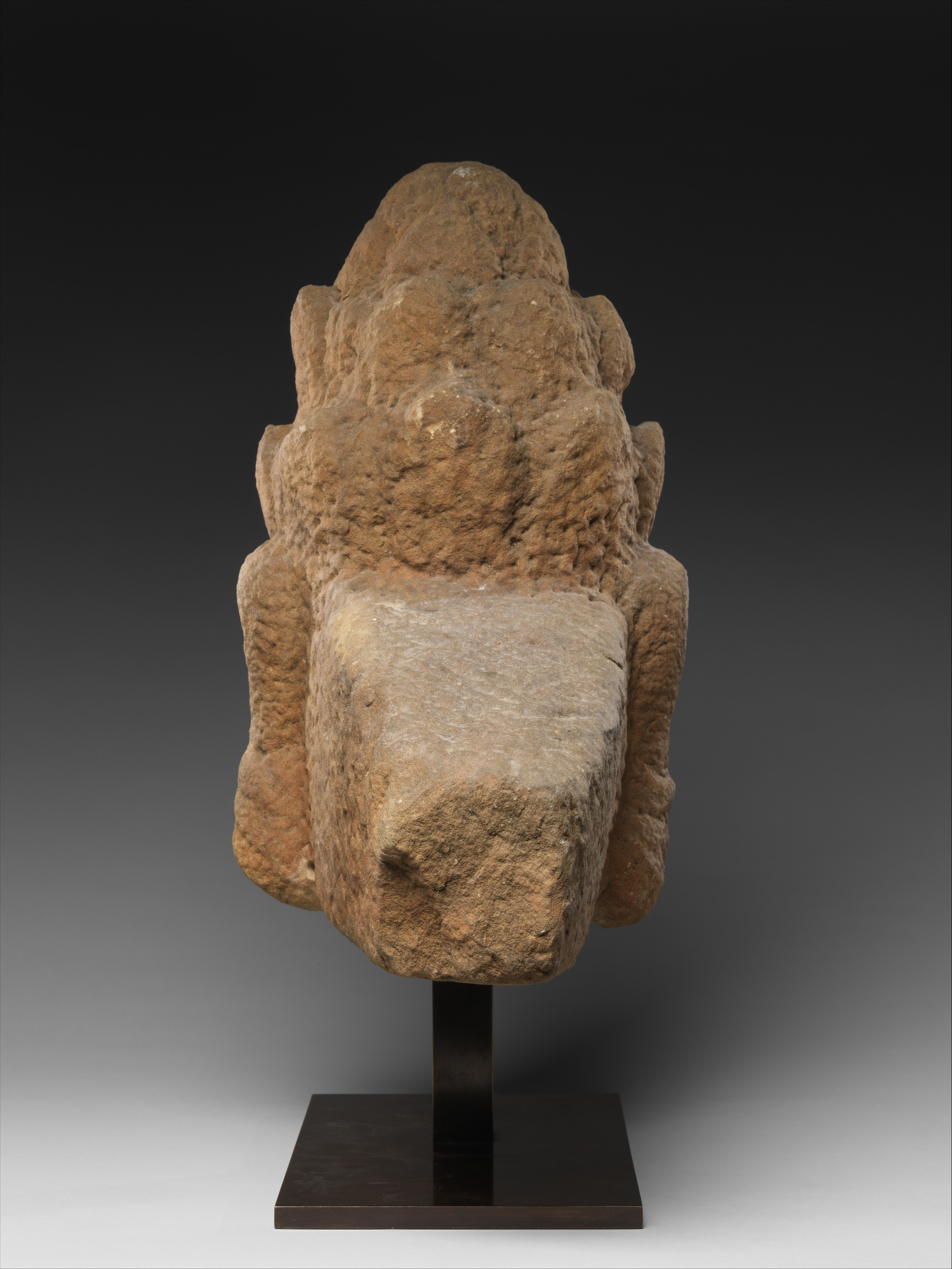
Posterior view

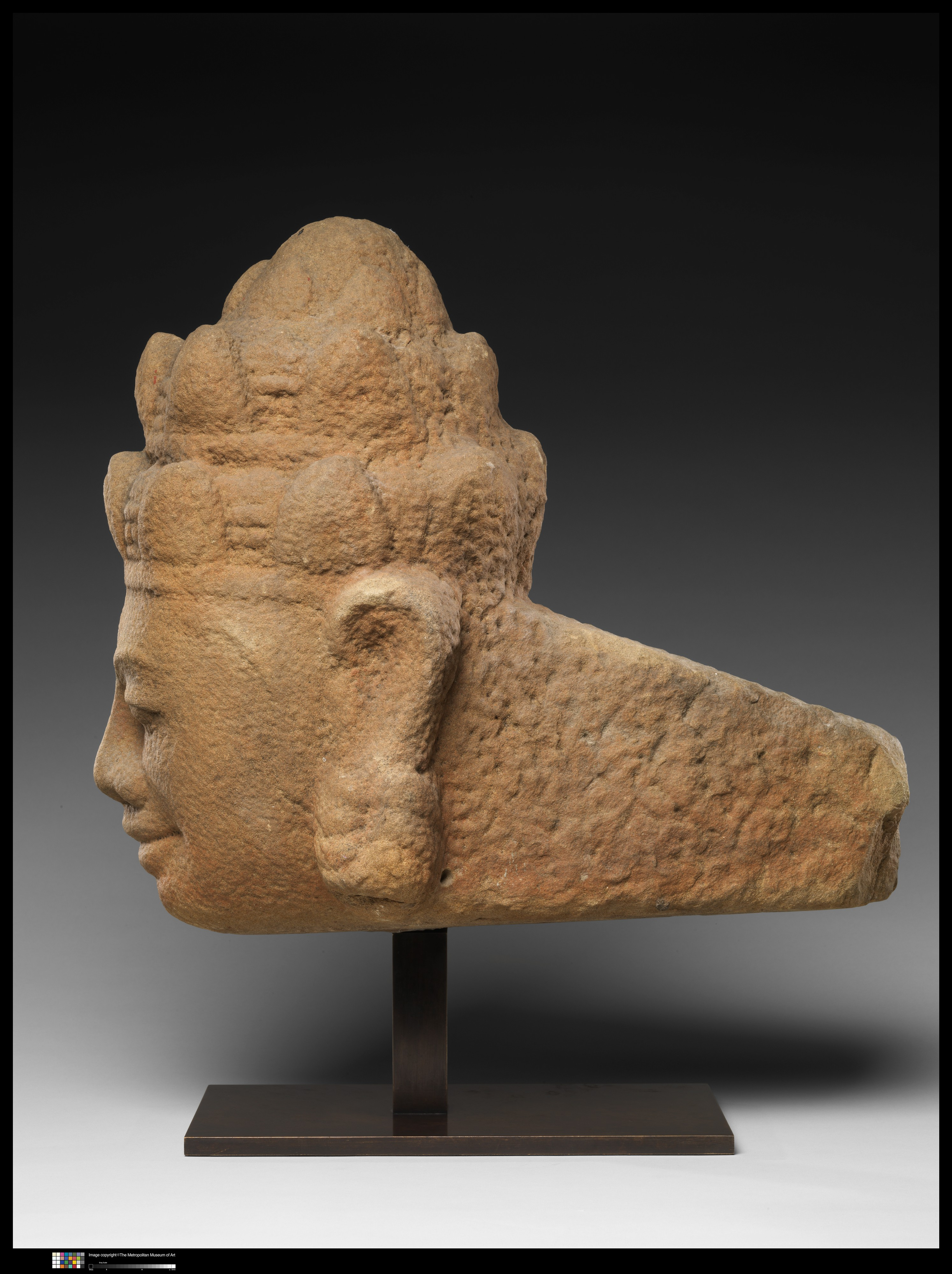
View from the right side

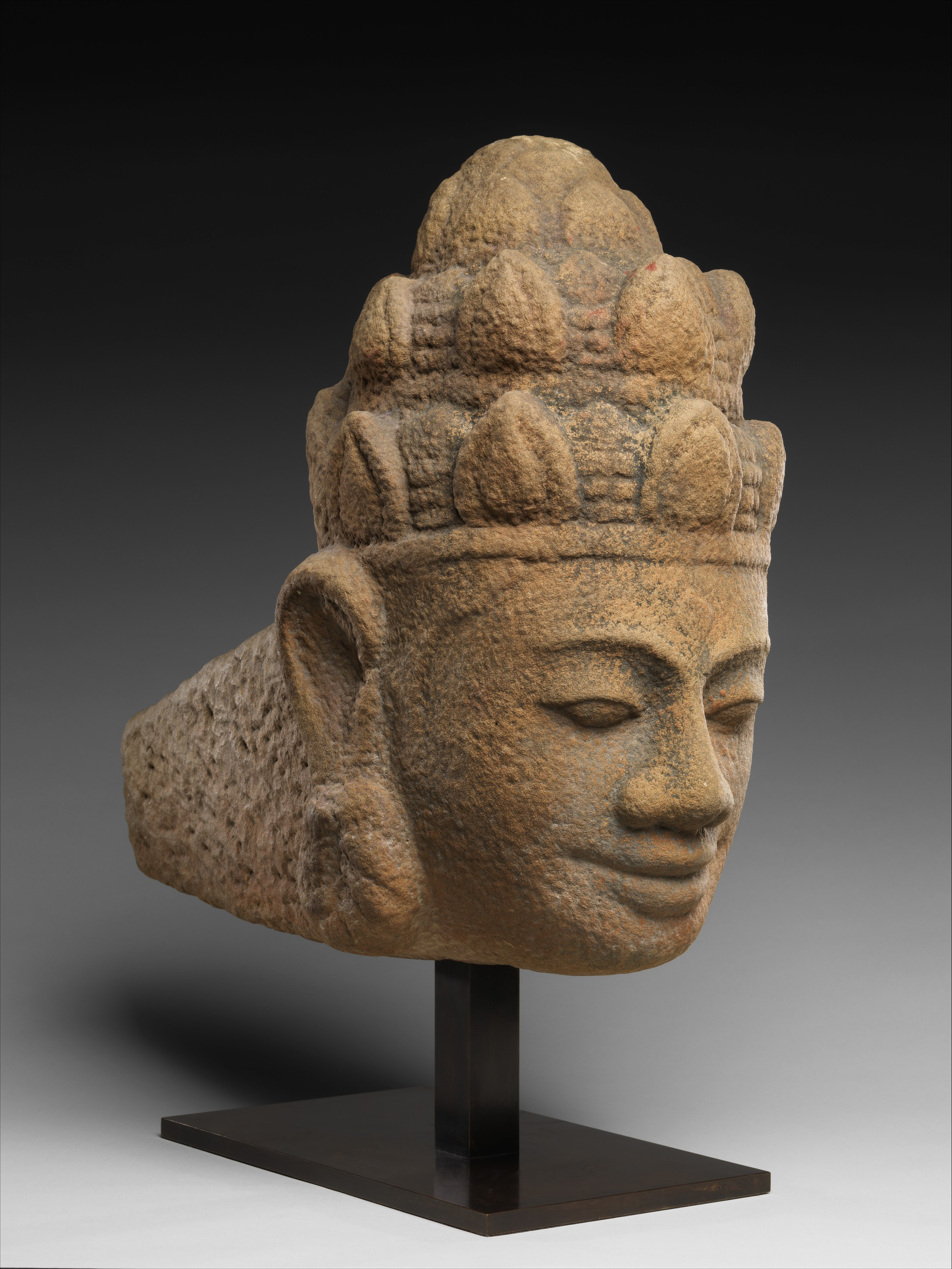
Oblique view with front of sculpture

== See also ==
- Shiva
