= Halenadu Karnataka Brahmin =

Halenadu Karnataka Brahmin ಹಳೆನಾಡು ಕರ್ನಾಟಕ ಬ್ರಾಹ್ಮಣರು
Regions with significant populations
- Southern districts of Karnataka

Languages
- Kannada, Tamil

Religion
- Hinduism - Advaita Vedanta; Divisions based on sect: Smarthas; Divisions based on Veda: Rigvedi

Related ethnic groups
- Smartha Brahmin, Kannada Brahmins

Halenadu Karnataka Brahmins (HKBs) are a sect of Kannada speaking Smartha Brahmins and follow Advaita Vedanta propounded by Adi Shankaracharya. HKBs are essentially Rig Vedic Brahmins and are known to follow Dharmaśāstra extensively in their life.

== Etymology ==
The term Halenadu Karnataka comes from two words Halenadu meaning old region and Karnataka which obviously refers to the state of Karnataka. Both these words refer to the regions. Historically Brahmins, especially Smartha Brahmins in Karnataka are divided on regional lines. Hence most of the Smartha Brahmin communities in Karnataka are also recognized by their region. For example Hoysala Karnataka Brahmins mainly concentrated in regions ruled by Hoysala kings, Badaganadu Brahmins originating from Northern part of South Karnataka, Sirinadu Brahmins concentrated in Tumkur District. Going by this system of naming Smartha Brahmin communities it can be concluded that Halenadu Karnataka Brahmins belong to Halenadu region in Karnataka. The general consensus of scholars is that Halenadu refers to the Mysore region comprising Mysore, Mandya and Chamarajanagar of modern Karnataka state. Halenadu Karnataka Brahmins are also concentrated in this region. Muguru Karnataka Brahmins also are a part of the Halenadu Brahmin community, Muguru is a village in T.Narasipura taluk of Mysore district. Once upon a time T.Narasipura and its surrounding areas were the center of political activities.

There are some arguments against the above conclusion. The main reason is the name "Halenadu Karnataka" is of fairly recent in origin. Halenadu Karnataka is the name by which Sringeri Mutt, and its recognizes the community though Muguru Karnataka is also equally known. Sringeri Mutt records show Muguru Karnataka names from the 20th century onward. So, many people conclude "Halenadu" signifies that HKBs are one of the first Brahmin communities to come into existence in Karnataka.

== Origin of Halenadu Karnataka Brahmins ==
Scholars are split in their opinion on the origin of Halenadu Karnataka Brahmins. But general consensus is that Halenadu Karnataka Brahmins originated in Karnataka and mostly natives of Karnataka from the beginning or at least well settled in Karnataka since very long period. One can see word "Karnataka" suffixed to name of community in almost all records in the history which refers to the community makes it pretty conclusive that the community belongs to Karnataka.(Halenadu Karnatakas are one of the two Brahmin communities to use this word as part of community name till date; the other being Hoysala Karnataka Brahmins)

There are two theories of origin which are known.

=== Southern Origin Theory ===
According to this theory Halenadu Karnatakas originated in South Karnataka comprising Mysore, Mandya and Chamarajanagar of modern Karnataka state. Some people identify the region to include northern part of Tamil Nadu which was ruled by Pandyas of Madurai in their peak period. Many HKB families have settled in Coimbatore district of Tamil Nadu indicates this. There is also a belief that Halenadu Karnatakas were in the court of Pandya kings. However, no concrete evidence is available so far to confirm this.

The biggest argument which supports this theory is that almost all Halenadu Karnatakas were settled in South Karnataka including Hassan district in the beginning of the 19th century. The other supporting argument in favour of this theory is that historically HKB occupied prominent positions in the court of kings and regional chieftains in South Karnataka. HKB were backbone of the administration and occupied various official and quasi-judicial positions in the kingdom of these regional chieftains including Wodeyars of Mysore. Normally only local Brahmin communities were appointed by kings/chieftains to do this work because the local chieftains and kings used to trust only local Brahmin communities who have lived there for centuries. Since almost all villages in Halenadu region had HKBs as administrators, accountants etc. it is very likely that Halenadu Karnatakas are the natives of South Karnataka. This view is strongly supported by Tagaduru Ramachandra Rao, veteran freedom fighter and prominent leader of community in his book on the MKB community.

There is an incident which shows some light on the origin and elevation in the status MKBs in society in medieval period.

During the rule of Mysore Wodeyars in the 17th century, the Brahmins in the court of then Mysore King had a scholarly debate. One group of 64 Brahmin scholars lost the debate. These 64 Brahmin scholars wanted to regain their prestige in the court after the loss. So, they went in search of a vedic scholar. There was a scholar by the name of Jagannatha Acharya who was well versed in vedas and also believed to have intuitive powers. The '64 Brahmins' learnt vedashastras under Jagannatha Acharya for several years and became scholars. After returning to Mysore, they invited other Brahmins who had won against them for another debate in the court. This time 64 Brahmins could win the debate on vedashastras. The king was pleased after their victory and granted many gifts, positions and other facilities for these 64 Brahmins. As a result this group of 64 Brahmins elevated in the status and occupied key positions in the administration and also they were identified separately as Halenadu Karnataka Brahmins. The name of MKBs do not occur in any records or epigraphs till the 18th century. The records in Sringeri Mutt and Mysore Gazetteer of British mention the name of HKBs only from the 18th or early 19th century onwards. It is not clear whether MKBs were known as MKBs before the 19th century or it was the name given to '64 Brahmin scholars' after they demonstrated their knowledge in the royal court.

=== North Karnataka Origin ===
Some community members believe that they were earlier residents of northern Karnataka and migrated towards South Karnataka after the fall of Vijayanagar empire. They support their arguments by referring to Kuladevatas of their families which are located in north Karnataka. But there is not much support to this theory as only a small percentage of Halenadu Karnatakas worship deities located in north Karnataka as Kuladevathas. However, it is likely that when Vijayanagara kingdom was at its peak many HKBs were spread across north Karnataka and later migrated towards South Karnataka.

== Occupation ==
Historically Halenadu Karnataka Brahmins occupied high positions during the rule of Vijayanagara kings and later during the rule of Wodeyars of Mysore. They were also involved in the administration of Pandya kings of Madurai. Apart from the administration, sizeable number of HKBs had agricultural land. Today most of HKBs have migrated to cities like Mysore, Bangalore and Mumbai. As a result agriculture is no longer the main profession of HKBs.

One special aspect about HKBs is that almost all of them pursue secular professions like teaching, accounting, law, engineering or medicine. Though there are quite a few number of HKBs who are performing priestly activities, these are mainly to cater to the need of Vedic rituals within the community.

== Faith ==
HKBs worship The One Universal God in many aspects and forms as per the tradition of Advaita. The presiding deity of Moogur is Lalita Tripura Sundari.
