= JO1 (disambiguation) =

JO1 may refer to:

- Jo1, a protein that is affected by anti-Jo1
- JO1, a boy band
- JO1 the Movie: Unfinished - Go to the Top, a documentary film about the boy band

== See also ==
- Jol (disambiguation)
- Joi (disambiguation)
