= Ishtadevata =

A worshipper's favourite deity, in Hinduism

Ishtadevata or Ishtadeva (Sanskrit: इष्ट देव(ता), iṣṭa-deva(tā), literally "cherished divinity" from iṣṭa, "personal, liked, cherished, preferred" and devatā, "godhead, divinity, tutelary deity" or deva, "deity"), is a term used in Hinduism denoting a worshipper's favourite deity. For the feminine version of a worshipper's favourite deity, the term Ishtadevi is then used with the most prominent example being the Mother Goddess Durga/Parvati or any of her manifestations.

It is especially significant to both the Smarta and Bhakti schools, wherein practitioners choose to worship the form of God that inspires them. Within Smartism, one of five chief deities is selected. Even in denominations that focus on a singular concept of God, such as Vaishnavism, the Ishtadevata concept exists. For example, in Vaishnavism, special focus is given to a particular form of Vishnu or one of his avataras (i.e. Krishna or Rama). Similarly within Shaktism, focus is given to a particular form of the Trinity Goddess such as Parvati, Lakshmi or Saraswati. The Swaminarayan sect of Vaishnavism has a similar concept, but notably holds that Vishnu and Shiva are different aspects of the same God.

== Smarta worship ==
The "worship of the five forms" (pañcāyatana pūjā) system, which was popularized by Adi Shankara among orthodox Brahmins of the Smārta tradition, invokes the five deities Ganesha, Vishnu, Shiva, Shakti, and Sūrya. This system was instituted by Adi Shankara primarily to unite the principal deities of the five major sects (Gāṇapatya, Śaiva, Vaiṣṇava, Shakta and Saura) on an equal status. The monistic philosophy preached by Adi Shankara made it possible to choose one of these as a preferred principal deity and at the same time worship the other four deities as different forms of the same all-pervading Brahman.

== Worship forms ==
Typically a practitioner worships their ishtadevata through the form of a murti. This worship may involve offering items to their chosen divinity such as incense or flowers, reciting mantras, singing their names and offering prayers.

Remembering the deity and internally building a relationship with (or through) them is considered essential to the practise. Within the Advaita schools it is believed that the human mind needs a concrete form to understand the divine that ultimately can never be defined. Just as one can understand the abstract concept of a color only after one has seen a concrete form, one can only realize the deity through a form of murti. In contrast, the Dvaita schools believe the Supreme Being to possess a divine form, and offer worship to their ishtadevata as either a representation or direct expansion of the Supreme Person. For example, Vaishnava schools offer worship exclusively to murtis of Vishnu, or his associated avatars such as Krishna or Rama.

Shaivites worship Shiva, either figuratively, or through his Lingam murti. As Shaivism contains both monistic and dualistic traditions either (or both) of the above approaches may be applicable.

In Hindu texts, four different methods of astrological determination of an Ishtadevata are prescribed. Two methods are found in the Shruti texts and two methods are found in the Smriti texts.

According to Shruti, the appropriate deity is determined directly by the Nakshatra, as well as by Graha that rules the Nakshatra.

According to Smriti, the suitable deity is determined by the fifth "Bhava" in the "Rasi" chart, and also by the twelfth "Bhava" from "Karakamsa" in the "Navamsa" chart.

== See also ==
- Bhakti
- Bhakti Yoga
- Henotheism
- Henotheistic aspects of Hinduism
- Icon
- Kuladevata
- Patron saint
- Smartism
- Vedanta
- Yidam
