= Hoysala Karnataka Brahmin =

Community of Smartha Brahmins

Hoysala Karnataka Brahmins
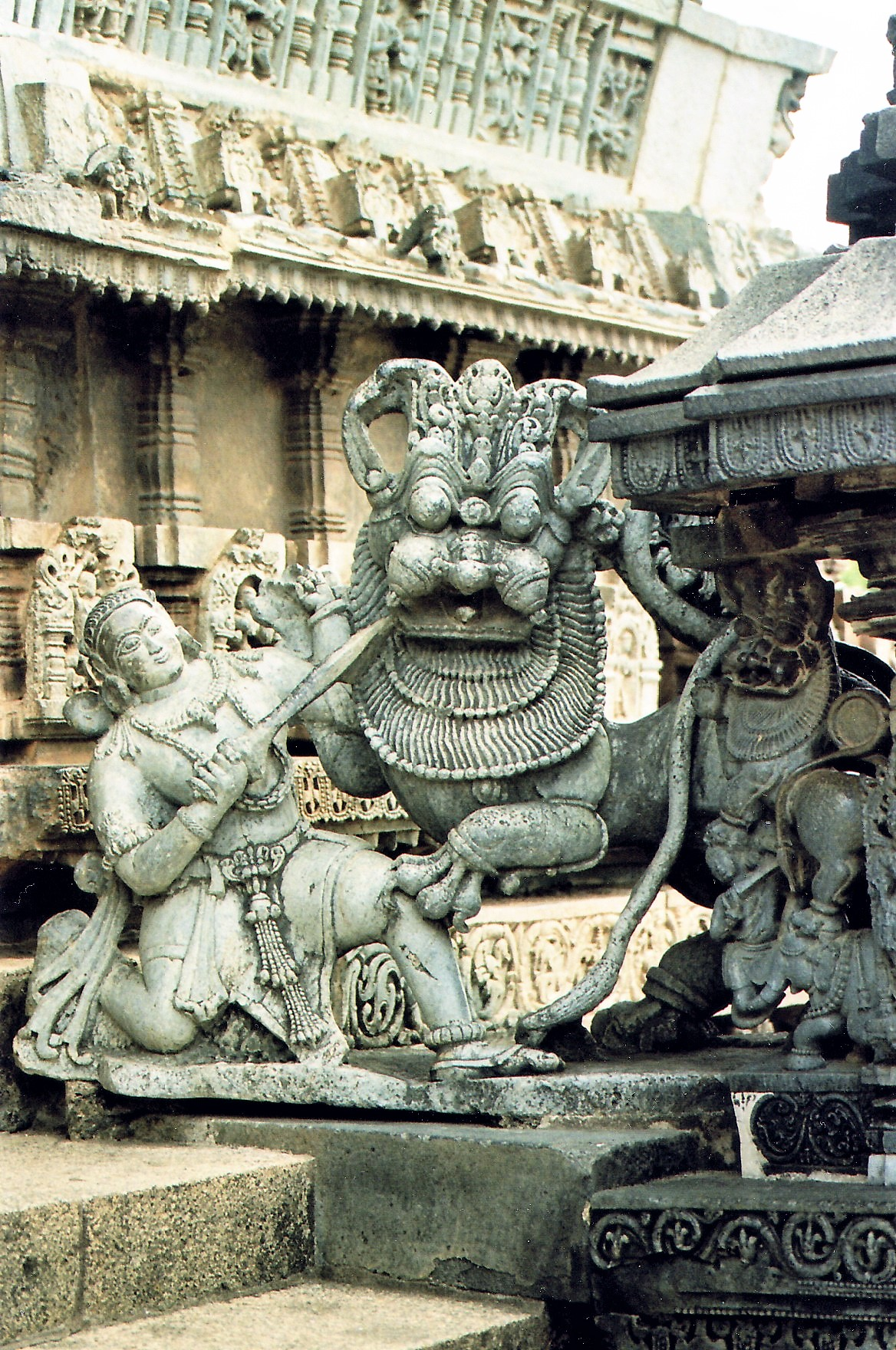
- Hoysala Empire emblem at Chennakeshava Temple, Belur

Regions with significant populations
- Karnataka

Languages
- Kannada, Sanskrit

Religion
- Hinduism

Hoysala Karnataka Brahmins are a community of Smarta Brahmins originating in the Hoysala Empire. The empire ruled most of what is now Karnataka between the 10th and the 14th centuries.

== Diet ==
The community has traditionally followed a strict vegetarian sattvic diet consisting of seasonal fruits and vegetables (except onions and garlic), whole grains, dairy, nuts, seeds, and oil. A typical breakfast item is uppittu (a thick semolina porridge with seasonings and vegetables). A typical dinner may include saaru (a thin soup made with lentils, tamarind, tomatoes, and spices) with rice, vegetable palya, and curd rice.

Other Hoysala Karnataka dishes include:

- Badanekayi-aloogedde gojju, a curry made with eggplant and potatoes
- Bili holige, similar to the rice flatbread akki rotti but softer and suppler
- Gulpavate, a sweet made with dried fruit, ghee, jaggery, and toasted wheat flour
- Mysuru kootu, a Karnataka-style lentil and vegetable stew
- Nucchina unde, quenelle-shaped lentil dumplings

== Titles and surnames ==
Common titles of community members include Bhat and Jois, which are also used as surnames. Rao is another common surname.

== Associations ==
The Hoysala Karnataka Sangha formed in 1908 but eventually disbanded.

== See also ==
- Forward Castes
