= Joi Internet =

Joi Internet was a dial-up Internet service provider based in Atlanta, Georgia. Joi Internet was a subsidiary of Hawk Communications (as were Access4Less and Access-4-Free). Joi Internet provided low-cost basic and accelerated dial-up Internet access, up to five POP3 e-mail addresses, free 24-hour technical support by telephone or e-mail, and newsgroup access.

Its accelerated dial-up made use of caching and compression, which allowed a user on a dial-up connection to surf quicker. It required installation of Joi's rebranded Propel Internet Accelerator. Joi Internet's parent company was sued by BellSouth Corporation in February 2004 on the basis of false advertising due to the claim that their accelerated dial-up was as fast as DSL. (CA No. 1:04-CV-0280-MHS, N.D. Ga.) BellSouth was awarded a preliminary injunction and an award of damages.

Hawk Communications sold its dial-up services to EarthLink (also of Atlanta, Georgia) in April 2005.

== Bibliography ==
- BellSouth sues Joi Internet for false advertising, Atlanta Business Chronicle, 13 February 2004, Justin Rubner
- BellSouth wins injuction against Joi Internet, Atlanta Business Chronicle, 14 April 2004
- EarthLink to get Joi Internet, Access4Free subscribers, Atlanta Business Chronicle, 20 April 2005
