= M. N. Jois =

M.N. Jois was born on 14 December 1905 in Mysuru (14 December 1905 – 28 March 2002) was an Indian freedom fighter from Mysore State known as the "Lion of Mysore". Jois took part in various movements to overthrow the British government as a legislator, politician, administrator, and educator.

There is an M.N. Jois Circle in Mysore and the street where he lived is also named after him. He died at the age of 98 years on 28 March 2002.

Describing his childhood and inspiration: "My father Shri. Narayana Jois was a teacher at Mari Mallappa's High School in Mysore. I also studied in the same school. Shri Venkatakrishnaiah, then the Head Master of the school, was better known as 'Tathiah - the Grand Old Man of Mysore'. This title was given to him by none other than Gandhiji in 1926."
