= Jois (surname) =

Jois is a surname from Indian state of Karnataka. It is mainly found among Hindus of the Brahmin community.

== Notable people ==
Notable people with the surname include:

- M. N. Jois (1905–2002), Indian freedom fighter from Karnataka
- R. Sharath Jois (born 1971), Indian teacher, practitioner and lineage holder (paramaguru) of Ashtanga Yoga
- Rama Jois (1932–2021), Indian chief justice
- Venky Jois (born 1993), Australian professional basketball player
