= Shanmata =

Hindu system of worship

Shanmata (Sanskrit: षण्मत, romanized: Ṣaṇmata) meaning "Six Sects" in Sanskrit, is a system of worship, believed in Hinduism to have been established by the Hindu philosopher Adi Shankara, whose lifetime was during circa 8th century CE. It centers around the worship of six primary deities of Hinduism: Shiva, Vishnu, Shakti, Ganesha, Surya, and Skanda. It is based on the belief in the essential oneness of all deities, the unity of Godhead, and their conceptualization of the myriad deities of India as various manifestations of the one divine power, Para Brahman.

== Philosophy ==
Adi Shankara's followers believe Brahman alone is ultimately real and the true self, atman, is not different from Brahman. It centers around the worship of the deities belonging to six āgama schools:

- Shaiva
- Shakta
- Vaishnava
- Kaumaram
- Ganapatya
- Saura

Philosophically, all are seen by Advaitins as equal reflections of the one Saguna Brahman, i.e. a personal divine with form, rather than as distinct beings.

== Relationship with Smartism ==
The Smarta tradition, a relatively modern Hindu tradition (compared to the three other traditions), invites the worship of more than one god, including Shiva, Vishnu, Shakti, Ganesha, and Surya among other gods and goddesses. It is not as overtly sectarian as either Vaishnavism or Shaivism, and is based on the recognition that Brahman is the highest principle in the universe and pervades all of existence.

Generally, Smartas worship Brahman in one of five forms: Ganesha, Shiva, Shakti, Vishnu, and Surya. Because they accept all the major Hindu deities, they are regarded to be liberal or nonsectarian. They follow a philosophical, meditative path, emphasizing man's oneness with God through understanding. Some Smartas accept and worship the six manifestations of Brahman, and the choice of the nature of Brahman is up to the individual worshipper, since different manifestations of God are held to be equivalent. It is believed that in Adi Shankara's time these deities had their own Hindu followers who quarreled with each other, claiming the superiority of their chosen deity. Adi Shankara is said to have synthesized these quarrelling sects by integrating the worship of all these deities in the Shanmata system.

== See also ==
- Ishta-Deva
- Panchayatana puja
- Smartism
