= Panchayatana puja =

Worship practice related to Smarta tradition

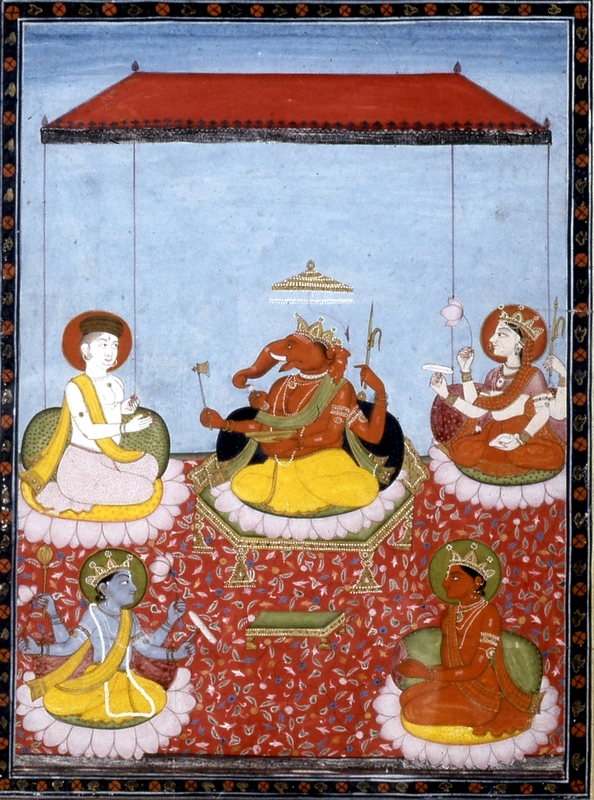
A Ganesha-centric Panchayatana: Ganesha (centre) with Durga or Adi Shakti (top right), Shiva (top left), Vishnu (bottom left), and Surya (bottom right).

Panchayatana puja (IAST Pañcāyatana pūjā) also known as Pancha Devi Deva Puja is a system of puja (worship) in the Smarta sampradaya, which is one of four major sampradayas of Hinduism. It consists of the worship of five deities set in a quincunx pattern, the five deities being Ganesha, Mahadevi, Shiva, Vishnu and Surya. Sometimes an Ishta Devata (any personal god of devotee's preference) or Kartikeya is the sixth deity in the mandala (see Shanmata).

Panchayatana puja has been attributed to Adi Shankara, the 8th century CE Hindu philosopher. It is a practice that became popular in medieval India. However, archaeological evidence suggests that this practice long predates the birth of Adi Shankara. Many Panchayatana mandalas and temples have been uncovered that are from the Gupta Empire period, and one Panchayatana set from the village of Nand (about 24 kilometers from Ajmer) has been dated to belong to the Kushan Empire era (pre-300 CE). The Kushan period set includes Shiva, Vishnu, Surya, Shakti and one deity whose identity is unclear. According to James Harle, major Hindu temples from 1st millennium CE embed the pancayatana architecture very commonly, from Odisha to Karnataka to Kashmir; and the temples containing fusion deities such as Harihara (half Shiva, half Vishnu) are set in Panchayatana worship style.

The typical arrangement of five icons or anicons in Pancayatana puja.

Philosophically, the Smarta tradition emphasises that all murti (idols) are icons of Saguna Brahman, a means to realising the abstract Ultimate Reality called Nirguna Brahman. The five or six icons are seen by Smartas as multiple representations of the one Saguna Brahman (i.e., a personal God, with form), rather than as distinct beings. The ultimate goal in this practice is to transition past the use of icons, then follow a philosophical and meditative path to understanding the oneness of Atman (soul, self) and Brahman – as "That art Thou."

Depending on the tradition followed by Smarta households, one of these deities is kept in the center and the other four corners of a square surrounding it. Either an iconic idol(s) or aniconic representation(s) or a combination for each deity is used. The five may be represented as simply as five kinds of stones called a Pancayatana puja set, or just five marks drawn on the floor. This arrangement is also represented in Smarta Pancayatana temples found in India, with one central shrine, and four smaller shrines at the corners of a square.

Panchayatana puja has predominantly been a tradition within Hinduism. However, the Udasis – a tradition that reveres the Guru Granth Sahib of Sikhism – also worship the five panchayatana deities.

== Swayambhu stones role in Panchayatana Puja ==
- In a standard Panchayatana altar, five non-anthropomorphic, self-manifested (Swayambhu) stones representing the cosmos are arranged together:
- How the Deities are RepresentedRather than highly sculpted idols, these deities are traditionally represented by naturally occurring, sacred stones (or banas) sourced from different rivers and regions in India:
- Shiva: Banalinga (typically smooth, naturally shaped stone)
- Vishnu: Salagrama (often a dark, fossiliferous stone)
- Ganesha: Sonbhadra (red or golden stone)
- Surya: Spatika (clear quartz crystal)
- Devi: Swarnamukhi (often a golden or specific river stone)

| Deity | Sacred Stone Representing the Deity | Core Origin Source | Location |
|---|---|---|---|
| Goddess Ambika Parvati | Swarnamukhi Shila | Swarnamukhi River, Andhra Pradesh | |
| Lord Shiva | Banalinga | Narmada River, Madhya Pradesh | |
| Lord Vishnu | Shaligram Shila | Gandaki River, Nepal | |
| Lord Ganesha | Sonabhadra Stone | Sone River, Bihar | |
| Lord Surya | Surya Crystal | Vallam, Tamil Nadu | |

== In Puranas ==
Contrary to the objections raised by some rival schools of the Smarta sampradaya, the practice of Panchayatana Puja is found to be enshrined in several Puranas as well, further substantiating its ancient origins. The presence of this practice in all categories of Puranas, be it Vaishnava, Shaiva or Shakta is a thorough testament to the fact of it being a widely popular form of worship in the ancient times.

The Narada Purana III.65.44-50 states:-

"44–50." When he worships Visnu in the middle, he shall worship Vinayaka, Ravi (Sun) Siva and Sivaa outside them. When he worships Sankara in the middle, he shall worship the Sun, Ganesa, Amba and Hari outside them. When he worships Siva in the middle, he shall worship Isa, Vighnesvara, the Sun and Govinda outside. If he worships Gananayaka (Ganesa) in the middle he shall worship Siva, Sivaa, the Sun and Visnu outside. When the Sun is worshipped in the middle he shall worship GaneSa, Visnu, Amba, and Siva respectively. Thus he shall worship respectfully the five deities every day".

In the Kārttikamāsa-māhātmya of the Skanda Purana Lord Surya states:-

"16–18." Viṣṇu, Śarva, I, Goddess and Vighneśvara i.e. Gaṇeśa (are to be worshipped). Though I am only one, I have become five as in the case of a Stage Manager in the course of a play. Know, O lord of birds, that these are all our own different forms. Hence holy bath in the month of Kārttika should be taken for the purpose of dispelling all sins by Sauras (followers of the Sun), Gāṇeśas (followers of Vighneśvara), Śāktas (followers of Śakti or Goddess), Śaivas (followers of Śiva) and Vaiṣṇavas (followers of Viṣṇu).".

In Padma Purana 6.88.43-44 Lord Krishna Tells Satyabhama:-

"As the rainwater goes to the ocean, the followers of Śiva, the Sun, Gaṇeśa, Viṣṇu, so also the worshippers of Śakti come to me only. I am one, born in five ways, and play with names—as one Devadatta calls his sons etc. with (various) names."

The Devi-Bhagavata Purana 11.17.34-36 reads as follows:-

"Thus the rules of the morning Sandhya are prescribed. Doing works so far, bid farewell to the above-mentioned Gayatri. Next finishing the Agnihotra Homa sacrifice, worship the five Devatas, S’iva, S’iva, Ganes’a, Surya and Visnu. Worship by the Purusa Sukta mantra, or by Hrim mantra, or by Vyahriti mantra or by S’rischate Laksmis’cha, etc., place Bhavani in the centre; Visnu in the north east corner, S’iva in the south-east corner; Ganes’a in the south-west corner, and the Sun in the north-west corner; and then worship them. While offering worship with the sixteen offerings, worship by repeating sixteen mantras."

== See also ==
- Adi Shankara
- Shanmata
- Smartism
