= Smarta tradition =

Tradition in Hinduism linked to Advaita Vedanta

Smarta
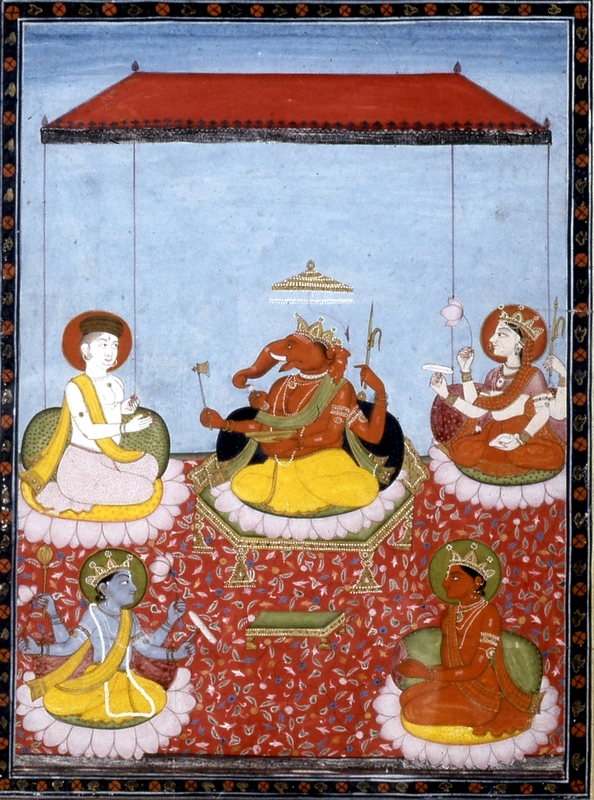
- The five primary deities of Smarta in a Ganesha-centric panchayatana: Ganesha (centre) with Shiva (top left), Adi Shakti (top right), Vishnu (bottom left), and Surya (bottom right)

Founder
- Adi Shankara

Religions
- Hinduism

Scriptures
- Vedas • Smritisastras

Languages
- Sanskrit, Old Tamil

Related ethnic groups
- Babburkamme, Iyer, Deshastha, Hoysala Karnataka Brahmins, etc.

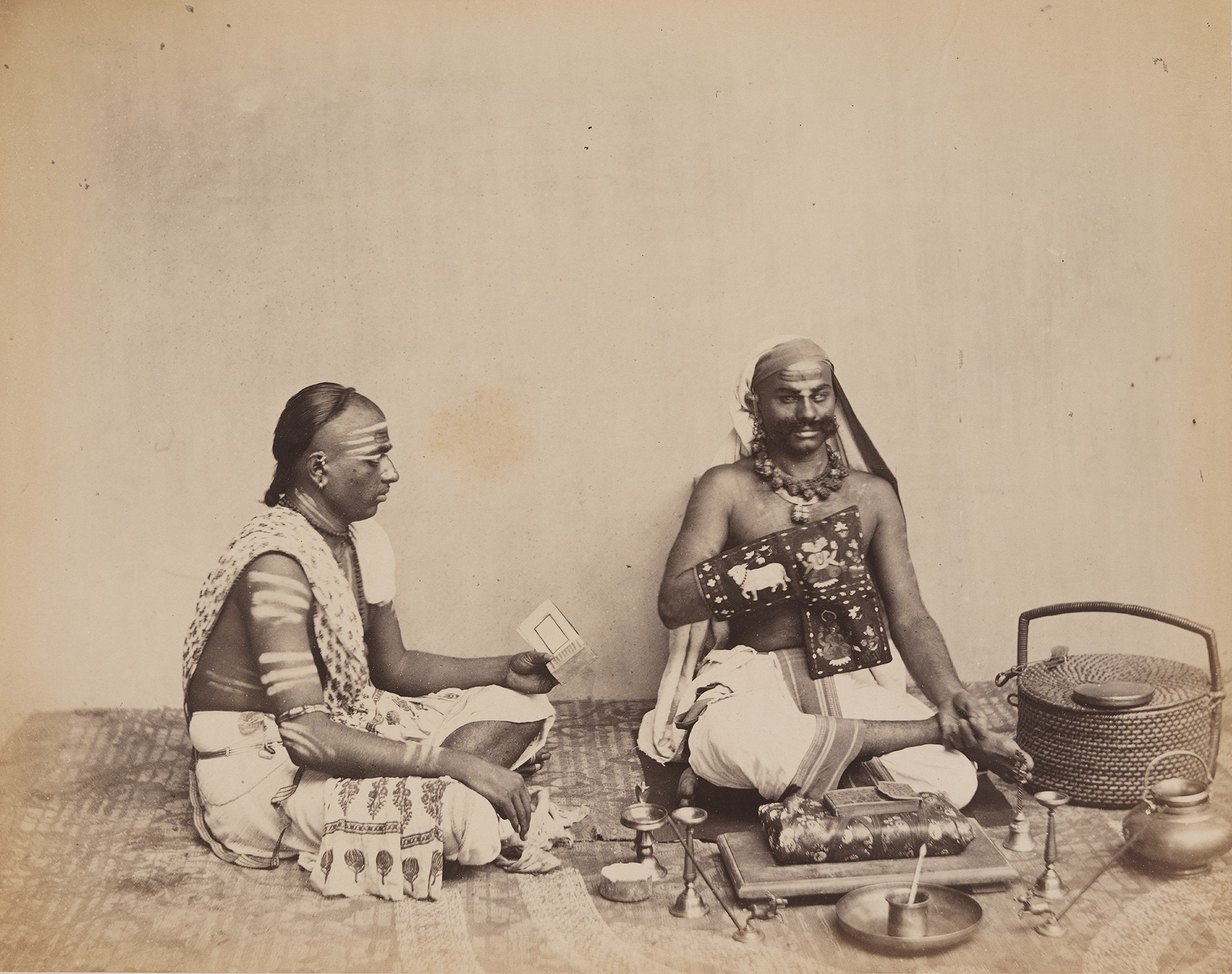
Smarta Brahmins in Western India (c. 1855–1862)

The Smarta tradition (Sanskrit: स्मार्त, IAST: Smārta) is a movement in Hinduism that developed and expanded with the Puranas genre of literature. It reflects a synthesis of four philosophical strands, namely Uttara Mīmāṃsā, Advaita, Yoga, and theism. The Smarta tradition rejects theistic sectarianism, and is notable for the domestic worship of five shrines with five deities, all treated as equal – Ganesha, Shiva, Shakti, Vishnu and Surya. The Smarta tradition contrasted with the older Shrauta tradition, which was based on elaborate rituals and rites. There has been a considerable overlap in the ideas and practices of the Smarta tradition with other significant historic movements within Hinduism, namely Shaivism, Brahmanism, Vaishnavism, and Shaktism.

The Smarta tradition developed during (early) Classical Period of Hinduism around the beginning of the Common Era, when Hinduism emerged from the interaction between Brahmanism and local traditions. The Smarta tradition is aligned with Advaita Vedanta, and regards Adi Shankara as its founder or reformer. Shankara championed the thesis that ultimate reality is impersonal and Nirguna (attributeless) and any symbolic god serves the same equivalent purpose. Inspired by this belief, the Smarta tradition followers, along with the five Hindu gods, include a sixth impersonal god in their practice. The tradition has been called by William Jackson as "advaitin, monistic in its outlook".

The term Smarta also refers to Brahmins who specialise in the Smriti corpus of texts named the Grihya Sutras, which concerns itself with the domestic responsibilities of householders, in contrast to the Shrauta Sutras - also a Smriti corpus, which emphasizes retention of the historical Vedic oral, communal, and ritual tradition. Smarta Brahmins, with their focus on the Smriti corpus, are contrasted from Srauta Brahmins, who specialise in the Śruti Corpus, that is, rituals and ceremonies that follow the Vedas. Though Smarta and Srauta Brahmins retain, study, and adhere to both Grihya Sutras and Srauta Sutras according to their familial Vedic Shakha, the contrast leads to differences in practice, occupation, and religious philosophy.

== Etymology ==
Smārta (स्मार्त) is an adjective derived from Smriti (Sanskrit: स्मृति, Smrti, IPA: [s̪mr̩.t̪i]). The smriti are a specific body of Hindu texts usually attributed to an author, traditionally written down but constantly revised, in contrast to Srutis (The Vedic Literature) considered authorless, that were transmitted verbally across the generations and fixed.

Smarta has several meanings:

- Relating to memory
- Recorded in or based on the Smriti
- Based on tradition, prescribed or sanctioned by traditional law
- Orthodox Brahmin versed in or guided by traditional law and Vedanta doctrine

In Smarta tradition context, the term Smarta means "Follower Of Smriti". Smarta is especially associated with a "Sect Founded By Shankaracharya", according to Monier Williams. Some families in South India follow Srauta strictly and do not accept any Vedanta systems. They even have a custom of the sacred thread being worn by women.

== History ==
Both Alf Hiltebeitel and Gavin Flood locate the origins of the Smarta Tradition in the (early) Classical Period of Hinduism, particularly with the nondualist (Advaita) interpretation of Vedanta, when Hinduism emerged from the interaction between Brahmanism and local traditions.

=== The "Hindu Synthesis" ===
Hiltebeitel situates the origins of the Smarta tradition in the ongoing interaction between the Vedic-Brahmanic tradition and non-Vedic traditions. According to him, a period of consolidation in the development of Hinduism took place between the time of the late Vedic Upanishad (c. 500 BCE) and the period of the rise of the Guptas (c. 320–467), which he calls the "Hindus synthesis", "Brahmanic synthesis", or "orthodox synthesis". It develops in interaction with other religions and peoples:

The emerging self-definitions of Hinduism were forged in the context of continuous interaction with heterodox religions (Buddhists, Jains, Ajivikas) throughout this whole period, and with foreign people (Yavanas, or Greeks; Sakas, or Scythians; Pahlavas, or Parthians; and Kusanas, or Kushans) from the third phase on [between the Mauryan empire and the rise of the Guptas].

The smriti texts of the period between 200 BCE and 100 CE (Note: The Vedanga texts, states Alf Hiltebeitel, are Smriti texts that were composed in the second half of the Vedic period that ended around 500 BCE.(Hiltebeitel 2013, p. 13) The Vedanga texts include the Kalpa (Vedanga) texts consisting of the Srautasutras, Grihyasutras and Dharmasutras, many of which were revised well past the Vedic period.(Hiltebeitel 2013, pp. 13–14) The Grihyasutras and Dharmasutras, states Hiltebeitel, were composed between 600 BCE and 400 CE, and these are sometimes called the Smartasutras, the roots of the Smriti tradition.(Hiltebeitel 2013, pp. 13–14)) proclaim the authority of the Vedas, and "nonrejection of the Vedas comes to be one of the most important touchstones for defining Hinduism over and against the heterodoxies, which rejected the Vedas." The Smriti texts interpret the Vedas in a number of ways, which gave rise to six darsanas (orthodox schools) of Hindu philosophy. Of the six Hindu darsanas, the Mimamsa and the Vedanta "are rooted primarily in the Vedic sruti tradition and are sometimes called smarta schools in the sense that they develop smarta orthodox current of thoughts that are based, like smriti, directly on sruti." They emphasize the Vedas with reason and other pramanas, in contrast to Haituka schools which emphasize hetu (cause, reason) independent of the Vedas while accepting the authority of the Vedas. Of the two Smarta traditions, Mimamsa focused on Vedic ritual traditions, while Vedanta focussed on Upanishadic knowledge tradition.

Around the start of the common era, and thereafter, a syncretism of Haituka schools (Nyaya, Vaisheshika, Samkhya and Yoga), the Smarta schools (Mimamsa, Vedanta) with ancient theistic ideas (bhakti, tantric) gave rise to a growth in traditions such as Shaivism, Vaishnavism and Shaktism. The revived Smarta tradition attempted to integrate varied and conflicting devotional practices, with its ideas of nondual experience of Atman (self, soul) as Brahman. The rapprochement included the practice of pancayatana-puja (five shrine worship), wherein a Hindu could focus on any saguna deity of choice (istadevata) such as Vishnu, Shiva, Durga, Surya and Ganesha as an interim step towards realizing the nirguna Brahman. The growth of this Smarta Tradition began in the Gupta period (4th–5th century CE), and likely was dominated by Dvija classes, in particular the Brahmins, of the early medieval Indian society. This Smarta tradition competed with other major traditions of Hinduism such as Shaivism, Vaishnavism, and Shaktism. The ideas of Smarta were historically influential, creative with concepts such as of Harihara (half Shiva, half Vishnu deity) and Ardhanarishvara (half woman, half man deity), and many of the major scholars of Shaivism, Vaishnavism, Shaktism, and Bhakti movement came out of the Smarta tradition.

According to Hiltebeitel, "the consolidation of Hinduism takes place under the sign of bhakti." It is the Bhagavadgita that seals this achievement. The result is a universal achievement that may be called smarta. It views Shiva and Vishnu as "complementary in their functions but ontologically identical".

=== Puranic Hinduism ===
According to Flood, the Smarta tradition originated with the development of the Puranas. The Puranic corpus is a complex body of materials that advance the views of various competing cults. Flood connects the rise of the written Purana historically with the rise of devotional cults centring upon a particular deity in the Gupta era. (Note: Wendy Doniger, based on her study of indologists, assigns approximate dates to the various Puranas: Markandeya Purana to c. 250 CE (with one portion dated to c. 550 CE); Matsya Purana to c. 250–500; Vayu Purana to c. 350; Harivamsa and Vishnu Purana to c. 450; Brahmanda Purana to c. 350–950; Vamana Purana to c. 450–900, Kurma Purana to c. 550–850; Linga Purana to c. 600–1000)

After the end of the Gupta Empire and the collapse of the Harsha Empire, power became decentralised in India. Several larger kingdoms emerged, with "countless vasal states". The kingdoms were ruled via a feudal system. Smaller kingdoms were dependent on the protection of the larger kingdoms. With the breakdown of the Gupta empire, gifts of virgin waste-land were heaped on brahmanas, to ensure profitable agrarian exploitation of land owned by the kings, but also to provide status to the new ruling classes. Brahmanas spread further over India, interacting with local clans with different religions and ideologies.

The early medieval Puranas were composed to disseminate religious mainstream ideology among the pre-literate tribal societies undergoing acculturation. The Brahmanas used the Puranas to incorporate those clans into the agrarian society and its accompanying religion and ideology. Local chiefs and peasants were absorbed into the caste system, which was used to keep "control over the new kshatriyas and shudras".

The Brahmanism of the Dharmashastras and the smritis underwent a radical transformation at the hands of the Purana composers, resulting in the rise of Puranic Hinduism, "which like a colossus striding across the religious firmament soon came to overshadow all existing religions". Puranic Hinduism was a "multiplex belief-system which grew and expanded as it absorbed and synthesized polaristic ideas and cultic traditions". It was distinguished from its Vedic Smarta roots by its popular base, its theological and sectarian pluralism, its Tantric veneer, and the central place of bhakti.

Many local religions and traditions were assimilated into puranic Hinduism. Vishnu and Shiva emerged as the main deities, together with Sakti/Deva, subsuming local cults, popular totem symbols and creation myths. Rama and Krsna became the focus of a strong bhakti tradition, which found expression particularly in the Bhagavata Purana. The Krsna tradition subsumed numerous Naga, yaksa, and hill and tree based cults. Siva absorbed local cults by the suffixing of Isa or Isvara to the name of the local deity, for example Bhutesvara, Hatakesvara, and Chandesvara.

=== Shankara and Advaita Vedanta ===
Traditionally, Adi Shankara is regarded as the greatest teacher and reformer of the Smarta tradition. (Note: Shankara himself, and his influential predecessor Gaudapada, used Buddhist terminology and mention Buddhist doctrines in their work, suggesting that they were influenced by Buddhism. Gaudapada, states Raju took over the Buddhist doctrines that ultimate reality is pure consciousness (vijñapti-mātra) and "that the nature of the world is the four-cornered negation", then "wove [both doctrines] into a philosophy of the Mandukaya Upanisad, which was further developed by Shankara". In Gaudapada's text, similarly, the Buddhist concept of "ajāta" from Nagarjuna's Madhyamaka philosophy is found. Gaudapada also took over the Buddhist concept of "ajāta" from Nagarjuna's Madhyamaka philosophy. Adi Shankara Acharya succeeded in reading Gaudapada's mayavada (Note: The term "mayavada" is still being used, in a critical way, by the Hare Krshnas.) into Badarayana's Brahma Sutras, "and give it a locus classicus", against the realistic strain of the Brahma Sutras. Yet, while there is borrowed terminology, Gaudapada's doctrines are unlike Buddhism. Gaudapada's influential text consists of four chapters; Chapter One, Two and Three of which are entirely Vedantin and founded on the Upanishads, with little Buddhist flavor. Chapter Four uses Buddhist terminology and incorporates Buddhist doctrines, state both Murti and Richard King, but Vedanta scholars who followed Gaudapada through the 17th century never referenced nor used Chapter Four, they only quote from the first three. The Gaudapada tradition is Vedantin with its foundation of Atman and Brahman, and his doctrines fundamentally different from Buddhism which deny these foundational concepts of Hinduism.) According to Hiltebeitel, Adi Shankara established the nondualist interpretation of the Upanishads as the touchstone of a revived smarta tradition:

Practically, Adi Shankara Acharya fostered a rapprochement between Advaita and smarta orthodoxy, which by his time had not only continued to defend the varnasramadharma theory as defining the path of karman, but had developed the practice of pancayatanapuja ("five-shrine worship") as a solution to varied and conflicting devotional practices. Thus one could worship any one of five deities (Vishnu, Siva, Durga, Surya, Ganesa) as one's istadevata ("deity of choice").

The Sringeri Sharada monastery, according to tradition founded by Adi Shankara, in Karnataka is still the centre of the Smarta sect.

=== Recognition of Smarta as a tradition ===
Medieval era scholars such as Vedanta Desika and Vallabhacharya recognized Smarta as competing with Vaishnavism and other traditions. According to Jeffrey Timm, for example, in verse 10 of the Tattvarthadipanibandha, Vallabhacharya states that, "Mutually contradictory conclusions are non-contradictory when they are considered from their respective contexts, like Vaishnava, Smarta, etc."

According to Murray Milner Jr., a professor of Sociology, the Smarta tradition refers to "Hindus who tend toward Brahmanical orthodoxy in both thought and behavior". Smartas are usually committed to a "relatively unified Hinduism" and they reject extreme forms of sectarian isolationism, reminiscent of the European discourse about the church and Christian sects. The tradition, states Milner, has roots that emerged sometime between 3rd century BCE and 3rd century CE, likely in response to the growth of Jainism and Buddhism. It reflected a Hindu synthesis of four philosophical strands: Mimamsa, Advaita, Yoga and theism.

Smarta tradition emerged initially as a synthesis movement to unify Hinduism into a nonsectarian form based on the Vedic heritage. It accepted varnasrama-dharma, states Bruce Sullivan, which reflected an acceptance of Varna (caste/class) and ashrama (four stages of human life) as a form of social and religious duty. In the later second half of the 1st millennium, Adi Shankara reformed and brought ideas to the movement in the form of the Advaita Vedanta philosophy. According to Upinder Singh, the Smarta tradition's religious practice emerged as a transformation of Brahmanism and can be described as Hinduism. Smarta as a tradition emphasized all gods as equal and different ways of perceiving the all-pervasive metaphysical impersonal Brahman.

=== Modern Hinduism ===
In recent times bhakti cults have increasingly become popular with the smartas.

Vaitheespara notes the adherence of the Smarta Brahmans to "the pan-Indian Sanskrit-brahmanical tradition":

The emerging pan-Indian nationalism was clearly founded upon a number of cultural movements that, for the most part, reimagined an 'Aryo-centric', neo-brahmanical vision of India, which provided the 'ideology' for this hegemonic project. In the Tamil region, such a vision and ideology was closely associated with the Tamil Brahmans and, especially, the Smarta Brahmans who were considered the strongest adherents of the pan-Indian Sanskrit-Brahmanical tradition.

== Philosophy and practices ==
=== Panchayatana Puja ===
The Smartas evolved a kind of worship which is known as Panchayatana puja. In this Puja, one or more of the five Hindu Deities (Surya, Shiva, Vishnu, Ganesha and Adi Shakti) are the objects of veneration. The five symbols of the major Gods are placed on a round open metal dish called Panchayatana, the symbol of the deity preferred by the worshiper being in the center. A similar arrangement is also seen in the medieval temples, in which the central shrine housing the principal Deity is surrounded by four smaller shrines containing the figures of the other deities. Some of the Smartas of South India add a sixth god Kartikeya (see Shanmata). According to Basham, any upper-class Hindus still prefer the way of the Smartas to Saiva and Vaisnava forms of worship.

Panchayatana puja is a practice that became popular in medieval India, and has been attributed to Adi Shankara. However, archaeological evidence suggests that this practice long predates the birth of Adi Shankara. Many Panchayatana mandalas and temples have been uncovered that are from the Gupta Empire period, and one Panchayatana set from the village of Nand (about 24 kilometers from Ajmer) has been dated to belong to the Kushan Empire era (pre-300 CE). The Kushan period set includes Shiva, Vishnu, Surya, Brahma and one deity whose identity is unclear. According to James Harle, major Hindu temples from 1st millennium CE embed the pancayatana architecture very commonly, from Odisha to Karnataka to Kashmir; and the temples containing fusion deities such as Harihara (half Shiva, half Vishnu) are set in Panchayatana worship style.

=== Saguna and Nirguna Brahman ===
According to Smartism, supreme reality, Brahman, transcends all of the various forms of personal deity. (Note: By contrast, the dualistic Vaishnava traditions consider Vishnu or Krishna to be the supreme God who grants salvation. Similarly, the dualistic subtradition of Shaiva Siddhanta holds the same beliefs about Shiva. Other traditions of Shaivism, Vaishnavism, Shaktism hold a spectrum of beliefs between dualism and nondualism.) The Smartas follow an orthodox Hindu philosophy, which means they accept the Vedas, and the ontological concepts of Atman and Brahman therein.

The Smarta Tradition accepts two concepts of Brahman, which are the saguna Brahman – the Brahman with attributes, and nirguna Brahman – the Brahman without attributes. The nirguna Brahman is the unchanging Reality, however, the saguna Brahman is posited as a means to realizing this nirguna Brahman. The concept of the saguna Brahman is considered in this tradition to be a useful symbolism and means for those who are still on their spiritual journey, but the saguna concept is abandoned by the fully enlightened once he or she realizes the identity of their own soul with that of the nirguna Brahman. A Smarta may choose any saguna deity (istadevata) such as Vishnu, Shiva, Shakti, Surya, Ganesha or any other, and this is viewed in Smarta Tradition as an interim step towards realizing the nirguna Brahman and its equivalence to one's own Atman.

== Texts ==
Smartas follow the Hindu scriptures. These include the shruti (Vedas), but most markedly the smriti literature, which incorporated shramanic and Buddhist influences of the period from about 200 BCE to about 300 CE and the emerging bhakti tradition into the Brahmanical fold. According to Larson,

[M]ost of the basic ideas and practices of classical Hinduism derive from the new smriti literature. In other words, Hindus for the most part pay little more than lip service to the Vedic scriptures. The most important dimensions of being Hindu derive, instead, from the smriti texts. The point can also be made in terms of the emerging social reality. Whereas the shruti is taken seriously by a small number of Brahmins, the smriti are taken seriously by the overwhelming majority of Hindus, regardless of class or caste identity.

The identity of Atman and Brahman, and their unchanging, eternal nature, are the basic truths in this tradition. The emphasis in Vedic texts here is the jnana-kanda (knowledge, philosophical speculations) in the Upanishadic part of the Vedas, not its karma-kanda (ritual injunctions). Along with the Upanishads, the Bhagavad Gita and Brahma Sutras are the central texts of the Advaita Vedanta tradition, providing the truths about the identity of Atman and Brahman and their changeless nature.

- The major Smriti texts are:
  - The two epics Ramayana of Valmiki and the Mahabharata, which have been commented on by many Smarta philosophers and scholars. Harikathas, Pravachanams, Upanyasams, and Kalakshepams on these texts are still very popular. The Ramayana is the text of choice for daily devotional reading or Nitya Parayanam for many Smartas and it has pervaded and guided Hindu conscience for centuries.
  - The Bhagavad Gita, which is part of the Mahabharata, and commentaries on it by Adi Shankara, Madhusudhana Saraswati and Sridhara Swami. The Bhagavad Gita exemplifies the "Hindu synthesis" of Brahmanic orthodoxy with the emerging bhakti traditions and the use of the shramanic and Yogic terminology to spread the Brahmanic idea of living according to one's duty or dharma, in contrast to the yogic ideal of liberation from the workings of karma.
  - The Puranas, a collection of mythological stories of the various Hindu gods, especially Shiva and Vishnu. The Srimad Bhagavatham and Vishnu Purana are treated with the same reverence as the major epics, as also being the chosen texts for daily devotional reading (Parayana grantham). "Sridhariyam" on the Bhagavatham, and "Bhavartha-Dipika" on the Vishnu Purana are well-known commentaries, both by Sridhara Swami.
  - Common religious law books or dharma literature, namely the Manu Smriti, the Apastamba Smriti and the Bodhyayana Smriti.

The Brahmasutra is considered as the Nyaya Prasthana (canonical base for reasoning). The Bhagavad Gita is considered as the Smriti Prasthana. The text relies on other Smritis, such as the Vedangas, Itihasa, Dharmasastras, Puranas and others. Some of this smriti literature incorporated shramanic and Buddhist influences of the period from about 200 BC to about AD 300 and the emerging bhakti tradition into the Brahmanical fold.

== Institutions ==
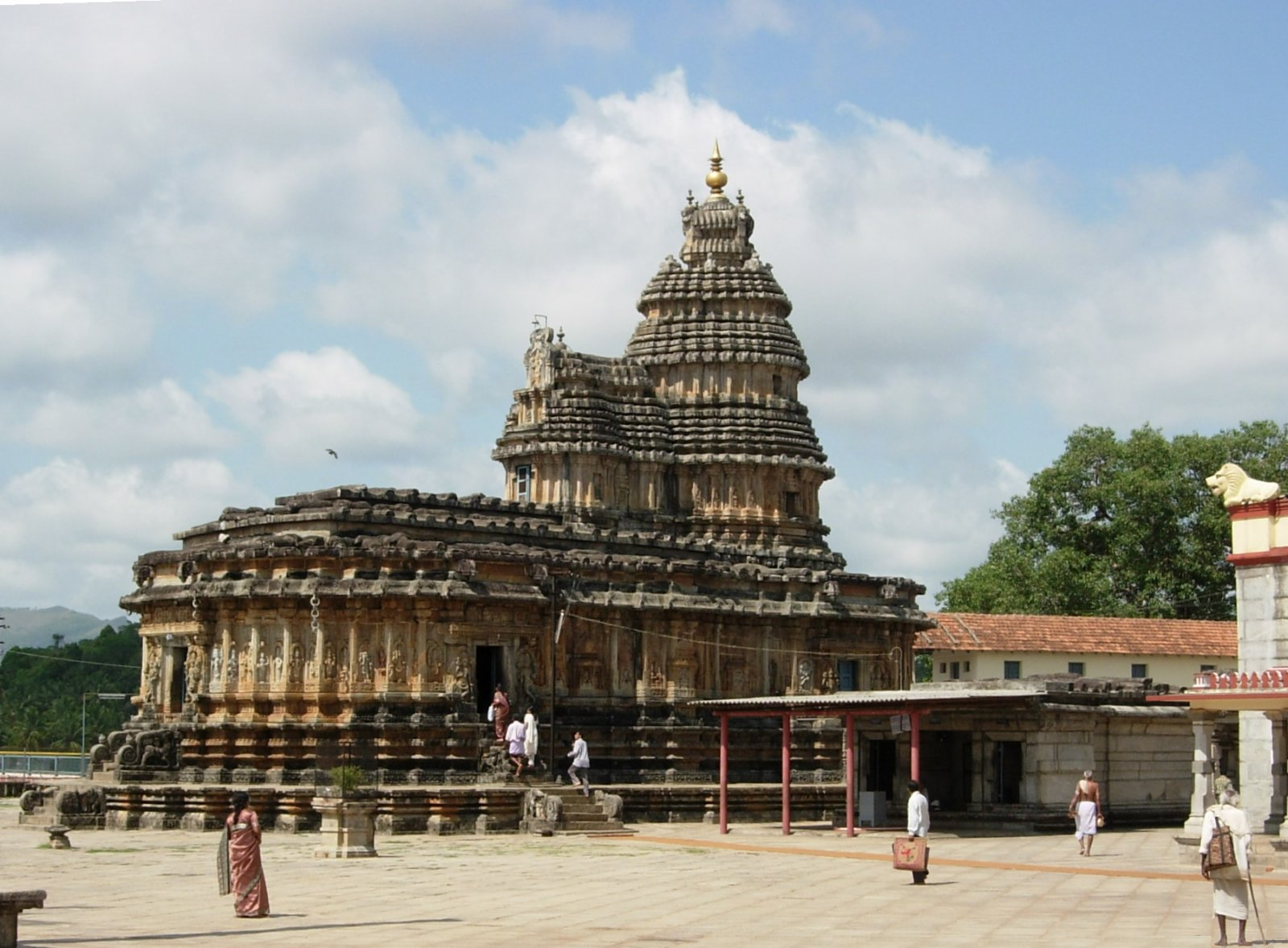
The Vidyashankara temple at Sringeri Sharada Peetham, Sringeri, Karnataka, a historic center of the Smarta Tradition.

The Smarta Tradition includes temples and monasteries. More Smarta temples are found in West and South India, than in North India.

Adi Shankara is one of the leading scholars of the Smarta Tradition, and he founded some of the most famous monasteries in Hinduism. These have hosted the Daśanāmi Sampradāya under four Maṭhas, at Dwarka in the West, Jagannatha Puri in the East, Sringeri in the South and Badrinath in the North. He himself Ascended the Savagna peetam in Kanchi, known as Kanchi Kamakoti Peetam. Each math was headed by one of his disciples, called Shankaracharya, who each independently continued the Advaita Vedanta Sampradaya. The ten Shankara-linked Advaita monastic orders are distributed as follows: Indra Saraswati at Kanchi, Bharati, Puri and Saraswati at Sringeri, Aranya and Vana at Puri, Tirtha and Ashrama at Dwarka, and Giri, Parvata and Sagara at Badrinath.

The mathas which Shankara built exist until today, and continue the teachings and influence of Shankara.

The table below gives an overview of the four largest Advaita Mathas founded by Adi Shankara, and their details. However, evidence suggests that Shankara established more mathas locally for Vedanta studies and its propagation, states Hartmut Scharfe, such as the "four mathas in the city of Trichur alone, that were headed by Trotaka, Sureshvara, Hastamalaka and Padmapada".

The Sringeri Sharada monastery founded by Adi Shankara in Karnataka is the centre of the Smarta sect for its disciples. Puri, Kanchi and Dwaraka Peetams have records of lineage of Sankaracharya since the 5th century BC.

Shishya (lineage)	Direction	Maṭha	State	Mahāvākya	Veda	Sampradaya
Padmapāda	East	Govardhana Pīṭhaṃ	Odisha	Prajñānam brahma (Consciousness is Brahman)	Rig Veda	Bhogavala
Sureśvara	South	Sringeri Śārada Pīṭhaṃ	Karnataka	Aham brahmāsmi (I am Brahman)	Yajur Veda	Bhūrivala
Hastāmalakācārya	West	Dvāraka Pīṭhaṃ	Gujarat	Tattvamasi (That thou art)	Sama Veda	Kitavala
Toṭakācārya	North	Jyotirmaṭha Pīṭhaṃ	Uttarakhand	Ayamātmā brahma (This Atman is Brahman)	Atharva Veda	Nandavala

Other Advaita Vedanta mathas following Smarta Tradition include:

- Svarnavalli Matha at Swarnavalli near Sodhe, Sirsi, Karnataka
- Ramachandrapura Math at Haniya, Hosanagara, Karnataka
- Kanchi matha, at Kanchipuram, Tamil Nadu
- Chitrapur Math, Shirali, Karnataka
- Shri Gaudapadacharya Math, Kavale, Ponda, Goa
- Sri Samsthan Dabholi Math, Dabholi, Goa

== Smarta Brahmins and Visvakarmas ==
=== Smarta Brahmins ===
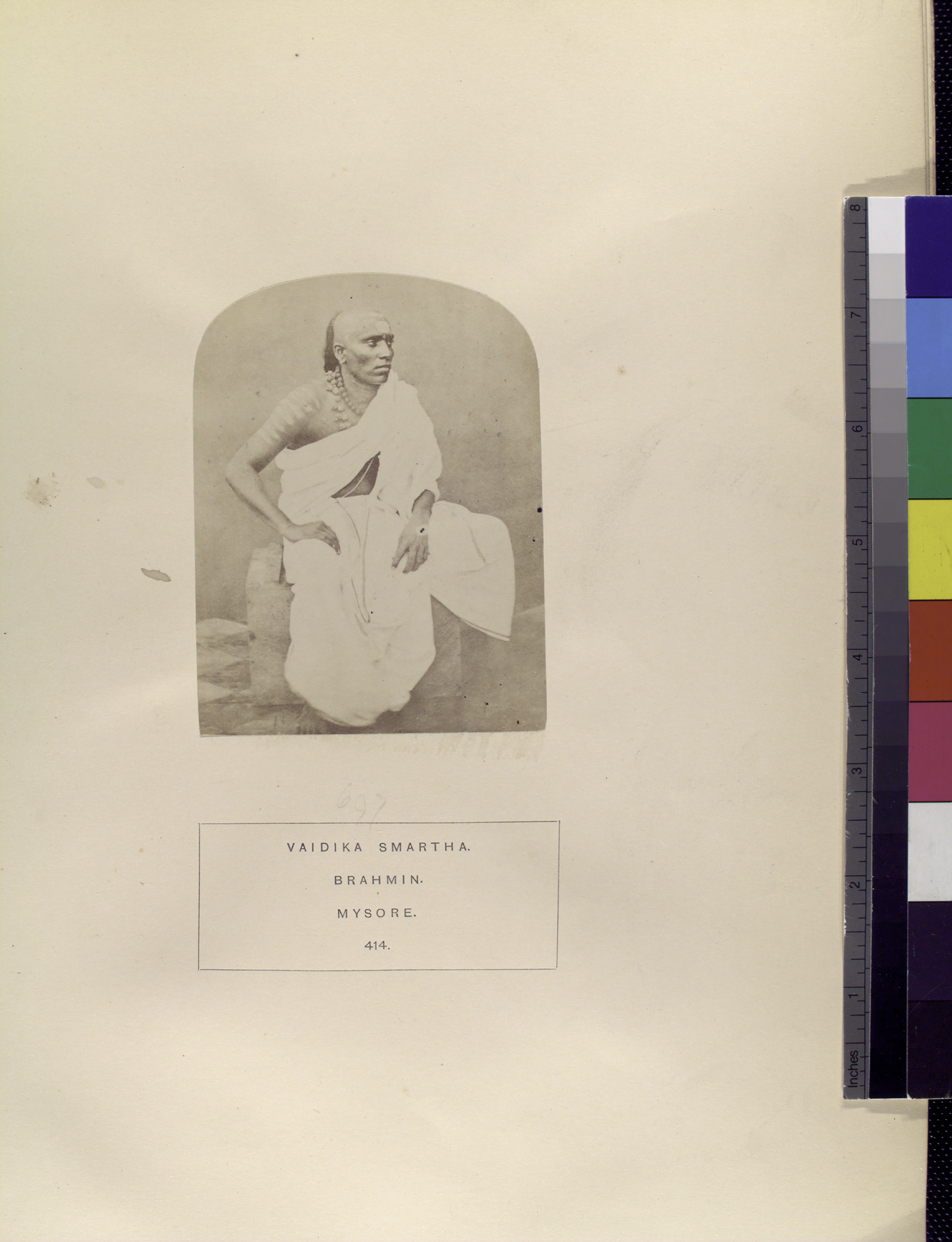
A Vaidika Smarta Brahmin from Mysore, 1868

The adjective Smārta is also used to classify a Brahmin who adheres to the Smriti corpus of texts.

Smarta Brahmins specialize in the Smriti corpus of texts, are differentiated from Srauta Brahmins who specialize in the Sruti corpus of texts such as the Brahmanas layer embedded inside the Vedas. Smarta Brahmins are also differentiated from Brahmins who specialize in the Agamic (Tantra) literature such as the Adi Shaiva Brahmins, Sri Vaishnava Brahmins and Shaiva Kashmiri Pandits. However, these identities are not clearly defined, and active groups such as "Agamic Smarta Saiva Brahmins" have thrived.

In a more general sense, all Brahmins who do not come from small communities of orthodox Vedic sects are considered Smarta Brahmins. Many orthodox Vedic sects have also turned to temple worship and management, which is considered a Smarta and Agamic tradition. Sri Vaishnava Brahmins sought to combine the Smarta tradition, Alvar Bhakti, and the Pancharatra traditions. Kashmiri Pandits combine Smarta and Agamic tradition.

=== Smarta Visvakarmas ===
Visvakarmas are artisans found in South India, such as in the state of Karnataka. They are known for their traditional expertise and skills as blacksmiths, carpenters, coppersmiths, sculptors, and goldsmiths. Smarta Visvakarmas are vegetarian artisans who follow the Smarta tradition. They contrast with Vaishnava Visvakarmas who follow the Vaishnavism tradition of Hinduism and some of whom may consume non-vegetarian food. The remarriage of widows is a tradition found among the Smarta Visvakarmas, but has been atypical among Vaishnava Visvakarma.

According to Brouwer, examples of Smarta Visvakarmas include Niligundapanta (traditionally blacksmiths and carpenters), Konnurpanta (all five artisan trades) and Madipattar (goldsmiths). The Smarta & Vaishnava Visvakarmas claim to be Brahmins but were never considered to be Brahmins by the mainstream smarta Brahmins of Karnataka and other castes.

== Influence ==
Vaitheespara notes the adherence of the Smarta Brahmans to "the pan-Indian Sanskrit-brahmanical tradition" and their influence on pan-Indian nationalism:

The emerging pan-Indian nationalism was clearly founded upon a number of cultural movements that, for the most part, reimagined an 'Aryo-centric', neo-brahmanical vision of India, which provided the 'ideology' for this hegemonic project. In the Tamil region, such a vision and ideology was closely associated with the Tamil Brahmans and, especially, the Smarta Brahmans who were considered the strongest adherents of the pan-Indian Sanskrit-Brahmanical tradition.

== See also ==
- Neo-Vedanta
- Advaita Vedanta
- Ishta-deva
- Smarana

Prominent Smarta teachers

- Gaudapada
- Govinda Bhagavatpada
- Adi Shankara
- Sureshwaracharya
- Padmapadacharya
- Hastamalakacharya
- Totakacharya
- Vachaspati Mishra
- Sri Ramakrishna
- Swami Vivekananda
- Sri Ramana Maharshi
- Sarvepalli Radhakrishnan
- Madhusudana Saraswati
- Swami Karpatri

Sects Examples of sects that follow the Smarta tradition and Advaita Vedanta, with Shankara as the primary reformer:

- Halenadu Karnataka Brahmin
- Hoysala Karnataka Brahmins
- Iyers
