= Historical Vishnuism =

Historical Vishnu-centric religious tradition

Historical Vishnuism as early worship of the deity Vishnu is one of the historical components, branches or origins of the contemporary and early Vaishnavism, which was subject of considerable study, and often showing that Vishnuism is a distinctive worship — a sect. The tradition was forming in the context of Puranic Vaisnavism evolving in the process of revitalizing religion of Brahmanism, of which Vishnuism is believed to be a part, through assimilating a number of orthodox, non-conformist and tribal elements; the absorption of mother goddess worship, into what now known a Vaishnava sampradayas. It is a tradition of the historical Vedic religion and is distinguished from other historic schools later forming the Vaishnavism by its primary worship of Vishnu, later identified as the source of all Avatars. A number of separate sects or traditions merged with each representing the names of god of Vaishnavism. In contemporary Vaishnavism God is also known as Narayana, Vasudeva and Krishna and behind each of those names is a divine figure with attributed supremacy in Vaishnavism, that relates to historic traditions that some scholars theorize to be separate and distinct historically. It is distinct from Krishnaism, as in the revival of Bhakti, found in the Bhagavata it is referred as Vishnuism.

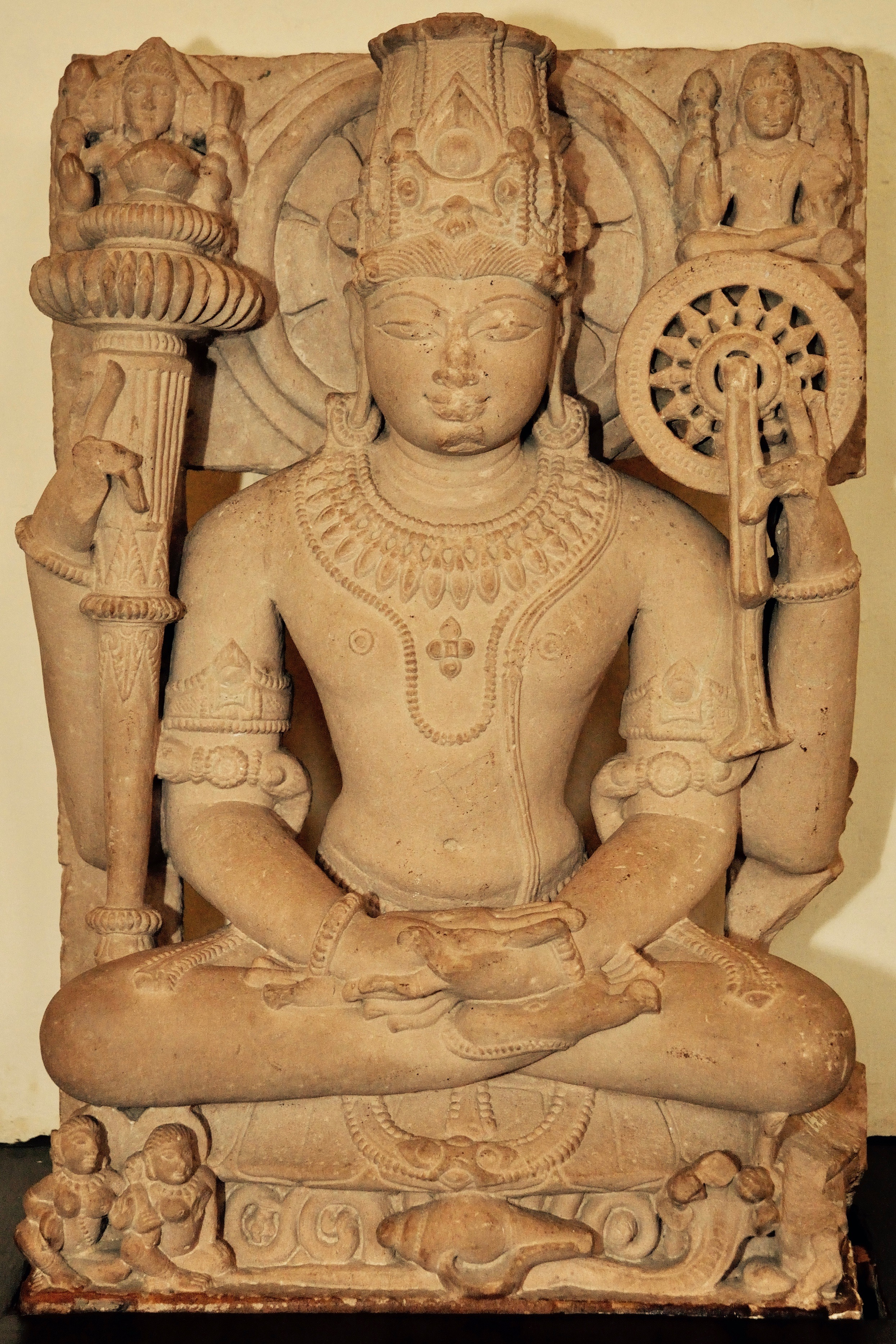
Mediaeval period sculpture of four-armed Vishnu in Meditation

The followers of Vaishnavism are referred to as Vaishnava(s) or Vaishnavites. According to recent statistics, a majority of Hindus are Vaishnavas, with the vast majority living in India. The name Vaishnavite is a direct translation of Vishnite and often lead to confusion. Some sources identify Visnuism with Vaishnavism, while others prefer to distinguish Vishnuism from Krishnaism and Ramaism.

== Etymology ==
The term Vaishnavism and Vishnuism, entered the English language in the 19th century, and was formed by attaching the suffix -ism to Sanskrit Vaishnava or Vishnu (IAST: vaiṣṇava or viṣṇu), where first is the vriddhi form of the second meaning "relating, belonging, or sacred to Vishnu" or "a worshiper or follower of Vishnu". However Vaishnava may also refer to worshiper of Rama, Nrisimha or Krishna, whereas Vishnuite more often refers to one who primarily worships Vishnu.

== Principal beliefs ==
=== Vishnu: The Supreme ===
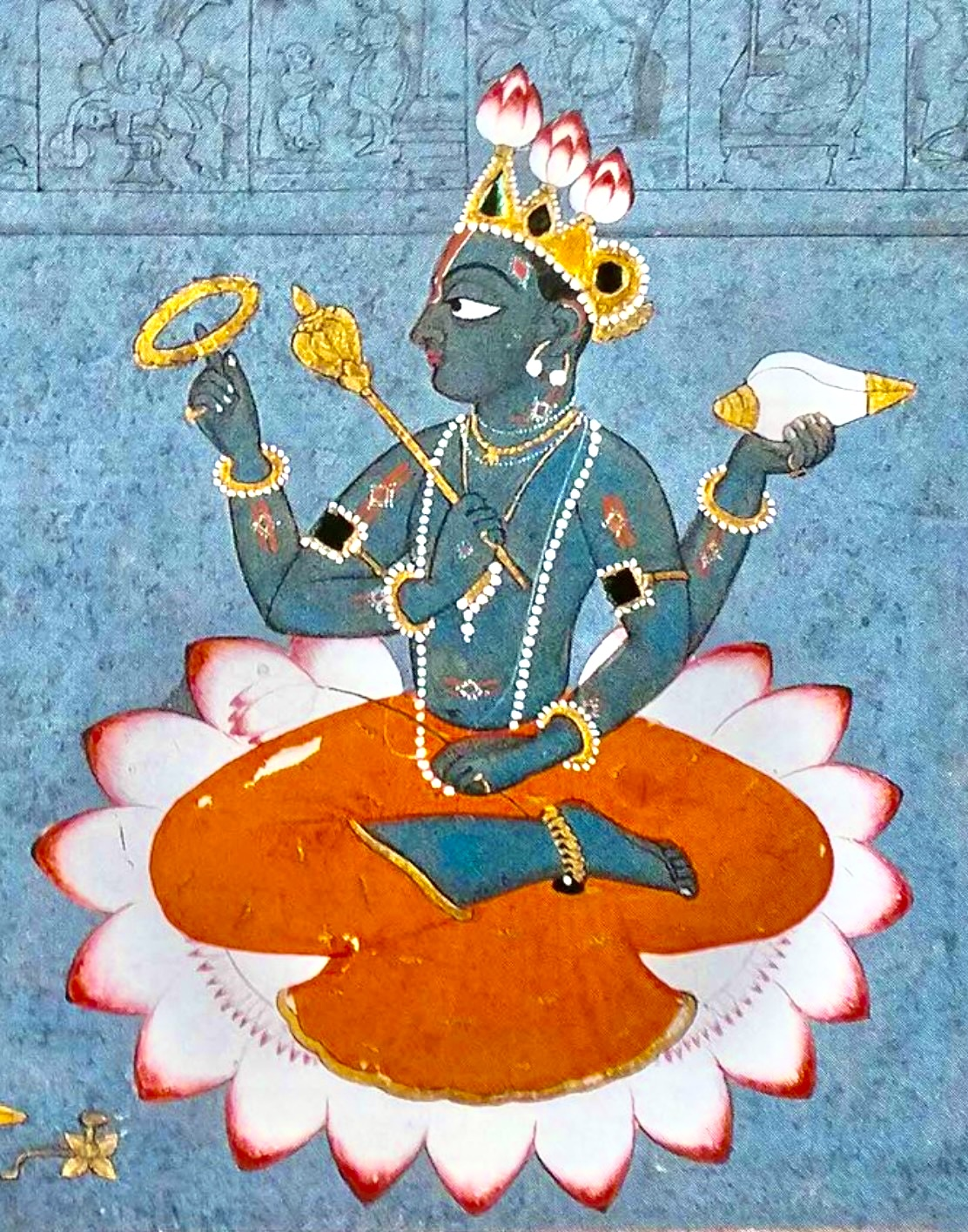
Vishnu, as commonly depicted in his four-armed form

The principal belief of Vishnuism is the identification of Vishnu as supreme or principal worship of him as was the case in the Historical Vedic times. Hopkins writes: there is a passage like the great Ka hymn of the Rig Veda, 'whom as god shall one worship?' The sages say to Vishnu: "All men worship thee;" In the Rig Veda he is referred by his name of trivikrama (who took three strides) and is believed by some scholars as the starting point of the evidence of such worship.

== History of Vishnu-centered Vaishnavism ==
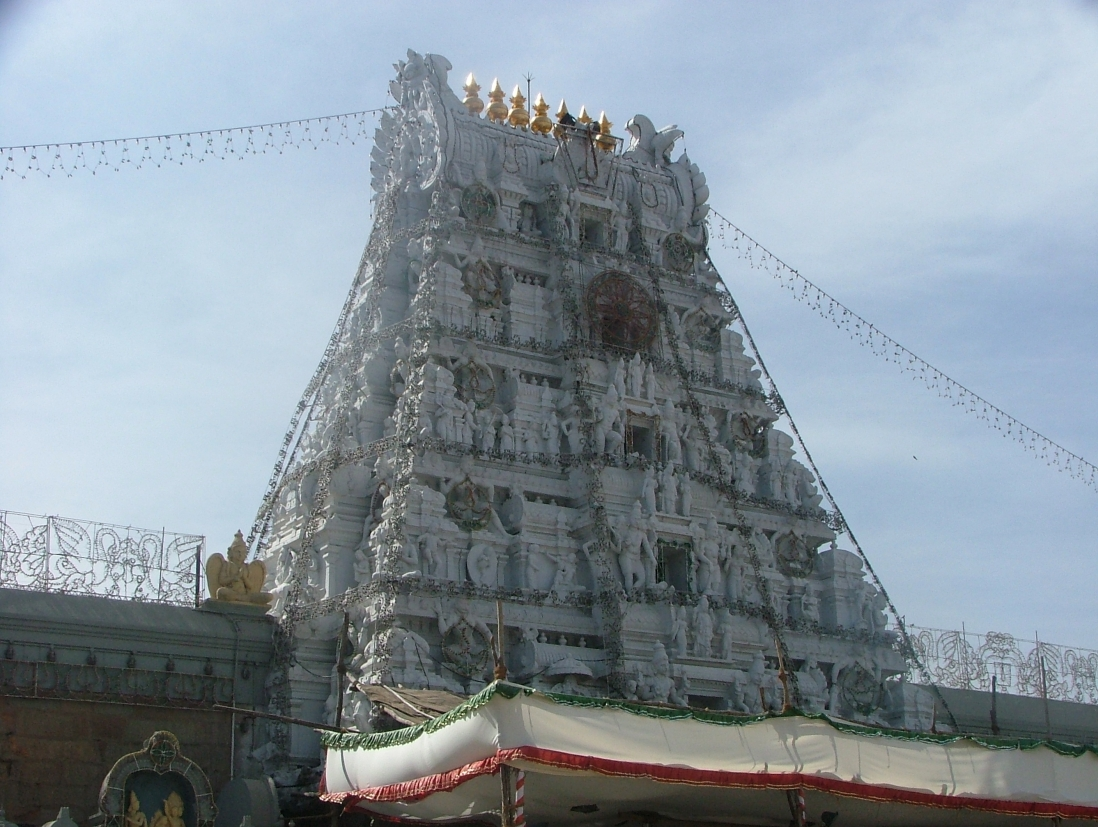
Temple dedicated to the worship of Vishnu as Venkateswara.

Number of stages to the history of Vaishnavism place worship of Vishnu in different perspective according to the different theories by different authors. On the first stage, in its twofold aspect - historic and philosophical, is referred as by some as Bhagavata and is believed to be founded by Krishna-Vasudeva, of Yadava tribe. The philosophical basis of this stage was that supreme being is eternal, infinite and full of grace, and that liberation consisted in a life of perpetual bliss near the Lord. During this stage some believe that Pancaratra entered into alliance with ancient Samkhya yogic system, in line with tendency to combine philosophy with religion. It is this period that is described as the stage when the sect of Narayana was absorbed into temple of Krishna-Vasudeva. According to Grierson's views at this stage Bhagavatism became a sect of Brahmanised anti-Brahmanists. Hopkins often remarked on the often expressed view, that Bhagavad Gita bears witness to the compromise thus arrived at between Brahmanism and Bhagavatism - "it is a Krishnaite version of a Vishnuite poem. For this reason Krishna, the personal name of Vasudeva, was given admission into the circle of Brahminical gods as an avatar of Vishnu.

Adoption of Buddha as one of the avatars of Vishnu under Bhagavatism believed to be similarly a canalizing factor in assimilation in relationships during Gupta period 330-550 CE. Thus Mahayana Buddhism is sometimes called Buddha-Bhagavatism. It is in this period that it is commonly accepted among academics that the concept of avatar of Vishnu was fully developed.

Thus complex religion of Vaishnavism is often viewed as a synthesis of the worship of gods Vishnu, Narayana, Vasudeva and Krishna which is achieved by the time of Bhagavad Gita (c. 4th century BCE to 3rd century CE). Worship of Vishnu is called Vishnuism and the monotheistic worship of Vishnu was already well developed in the period of the Itihasas.

This form of Vaishnavism flourished in South India and it is still commonplace, especially in present-day Tamil Nadu, Andhra Pradesh, Karnataka, as a result of the twelve Alvars, saints who spread the sect to the common people with their devotional hymns. The temples which the Alvars visited or founded are now known as Divya Desams. Their poems in praise of Vishnu and Krishna in Tamil language are collectively known as Naalaayira Divya Prabandham (alternatively called as Dravida Vedas).

== See also ==
- Mahajanas
- Vaikhanasas
- Shaivism
- Shaktism
- Sri Sampradaya
