= September 20 =

September 20 this year in various calendars
- Sunday, 20 September 2026
Akan	Fokwasi
Armenian	2 Sahmi 1476
Aztec	Tititl 13, 7 Cipactli
Babylonian	7 Ululu, 2337 SE
Balinese pawukon	Luang, Pepet, Pasah, Jaya, Keliwon, Tungleh, Redite of Bala, Kala, Nohan, Duka
Bengali	5 Ashshin, BS 1433
Chinese	Yin Fire Rooster・Room Mansion; Fire Horse Year, Month 8, Day 10 (Bailu, 3 days until Qiufen)
Common Era	20 September 2026 CE
Coptic	10 Thout, AM 1743
Egyptian	7 Mechir, 2775 NE
Ethiopian	10 Maskaram, 2019 Amätä Məhrät
French Republican	La Fête de l'Opinion de l'Année 234 de la République
Gregorian	20 September, AD 2026
Hebrew	9 Tishrei, AM 5787
Hindu	Pūrvāṣāḍha・Saubhāgya; Solar: 4 Āśvina, 1948 SE; Lunisolar: Navamī, Śukla pakṣa of Bhādrapada, 2083 VE; Rāudra・5127 KY・1,872,838
Icelandic	Sunnudagur, 27 Tvímánuður 2026
Islamic	7 Rabi' al-thani, AH 1448 (using tabular method)
ISO week date	2026-W38-7
Japanese	10 Hazuki, Reiwa 8 (Hakuro, 3 days until Shūbun)
Julian	7 September, AD 2026 (AM 7534)
Julian day	2461304
Korean	10 Dakdal, 4359 DE
Maya	13.0.13.17.1; 14 Chen, 7 Imix
Roman	ante diem VII Idus Septembres, MMDCCLXXIX AUC
Solar Hijri	29 Shahrivar, SH 1405
Tibetan	9 khrums, me pho rta 2153 or 1772 or 1000

<<	September					>>
Su	Mo	Tu	We	Th	Fr	Sa
		1	2	3	4	5
6	7	8	9	10	11	12
13	14	15	16	17	18	19
20	21	22	23	24	25	26
27	28	29	30
2026

September 20 in recent years
2026 (Sunday)
2025 (Saturday)
2024 (Friday)
2023 (Wednesday)
2022 (Tuesday)
2021 (Monday)
2020 (Sunday)
2019 (Friday)
2018 (Thursday)
2017 (Wednesday)

September 20 is the 263rd day of the year (264th in leap years) in the Gregorian calendar; 102 days remain until the end of the year.

== Events ==
=== Pre-1600 ===
- 1058 – Agnes of Poitou and Andrew I of Hungary meet to negotiate about the border territory of Burgenland.
- 1066 – At the Battle of Fulford, Harald Hardrada defeats earls Morcar and Edwin.
- 1187 – Saladin begins the Siege of Jerusalem.
- 1217 – Following the French defeat in the battle of Lincoln, Prince Louis of France ratifies the treaty of Lambeth under which he abandons all claims to the English throne and returns to France in exchange of an indemnity payment.
- 1260 – The Great Prussian Uprising among the old Prussians begins against the Teutonic Knights.
- 1378 – Cardinal Robert of Geneva is elected as Pope Clement VII, beginning the Papal schism.
- 1498 – The Nankai tsunami washes away the building housing the Great Buddha at Kōtoku-in; it has been located outside ever since.
- 1519 – Ferdinand Magellan sets sail from Sanlúcar de Barrameda with about 270 men on his expedition which ultimately culminates in the first circumnavigation of the globe.
- 1586 – A number of conspirators in the Babington Plot are hanged, drawn and quartered.

=== 1601–1900 ===
- 1602 – The Spanish-held Dutch town of Grave capitulates to a besieging Dutch and English army under the command of Maurice of Orange.
- 1697 – The Treaty of Ryswick is signed by France, England, Spain, the Holy Roman Empire and the Dutch Republic, ending the Nine Years' War.
- 1737 – The Walking Purchase concludes, which forces the cession of 1.2 million acres (4,900 km^{2}) of Lenape-Delaware tribal land to the Pennsylvania Colony.
- 1792 – French troops stop an allied invasion of France at the Battle of Valmy.
- 1835 – The decade-long Ragamuffin War starts when rebels capture Porto Alegre in Brazil.
- 1848 – The American Association for the Advancement of Science is created.
- 1854 – Crimean War: British and French troops defeat Russians at the Battle of Alma.
- 1857 – The Indian Rebellion of 1857 ends with the recapture of Delhi by troops loyal to the East India Company.
- 1860 – The future King Edward VII of the United Kingdom begins the first visit to North America by a Prince of Wales.
- 1863 – American Civil War: The Battle of Chickamauga, in northwestern Georgia, ends in a Confederate victory.
- 1870 – The Bersaglieri corps enter Rome through the Porta Pia, and complete the unification of Italy.
- 1871 – Bishop John Coleridge Patteson, first bishop of Melanesia, is martyred on Nukapu, now in the Solomon Islands.
- 1881 – U.S. President Chester A. Arthur is sworn in upon the death of James A. Garfield the previous day.
- 1893 – Charles Duryea and his brother road-test the first American-made gasoline-powered automobile.

=== 1901–present ===
- 1911 – The White Star Line's RMS Olympic collides with the British warship HMS Hawke.
- 1920 – Irish War of Independence: British police known as "Black and Tans" burn the town of Balbriggan and kill two local men in revenge for an IRA assassination.
- 1941 – The Holocaust in Lithuania: Lithuanian Nazis and local police begin a mass execution of 403 Jews in Nemenčinė.
- 1946 – The first Cannes Film Festival is held, having been delayed for seven years due to World War II.
- 1946 – Six days after a referendum, King Christian X of Denmark annuls the declaration of independence of the Faroe Islands.
- 1954 – The Moomin comics, created by Tove Jansson and Lars Jansson, is published internationally in the London newspaper The Evening News.
- 1955 – The Treaty on Relations between the USSR and the GDR is signed.
- 1961 – Greek general Konstantinos Dovas becomes Prime Minister of Greece.
- 1962 – James Meredith, an African American, is temporarily barred from entering the University of Mississippi.
- 1965 – Following the Battle of Burki, the Indian Army captures Dograi in during the Indo-Pakistani War of 1965.
- 1967 – The Cunard Liner Queen Elizabeth 2 is launched in Clydebank, Scotland.
- 1971 – Having weakened after making landfall in Nicaragua the previous day, Hurricane Irene regains enough strength to be renamed Hurricane Olivia, making it the first known hurricane to cross from the Atlantic Ocean into the Pacific.
- 1973 – Billie Jean King beats Bobby Riggs in the Battle of the Sexes tennis match at the Houston Astrodome.
- 1973 – Singer Jim Croce, songwriter and musician Maury Muehleisen and four others die when their light aircraft crashes shortly after takeoff from Natchitoches Regional Airport in Louisiana.
- 1977 – Vietnam is admitted to the United Nations.
- 1979 – A French-organized coup d'état in the Central African Empire overthrows Emperor Bokassa I.
- 1982 – NFL season: American football players in the National Football League begin a 57-day strike.
- 1984 – A suicide bomber in a car attacks the U.S. embassy in Beirut, Lebanon, killing twenty-two people.
- 1986 – Aeroflot Flight 36075 is hijacked at Ufa International Airport.
- 1988 – Margaret Thatcher delivers the Bruges speech, in which she articulates her opposition to further European integration.
- 1989 – USAir Flight 5050 crashes into Bowery Bay during a rejected takeoff from LaGuardia Airport, killing two people.
- 1990 – South Ossetia declares its independence from Georgia.
- 2000 – The United Kingdom's MI6 Secret Intelligence Service building is attacked by individuals using a Russian-built RPG-22 anti-tank missile.
- 2001 – In an address to a joint session of Congress and the American people, U.S. President George W. Bush declares a "war on terror".
- 2003 – Civil unrest in the Maldives breaks out after a prisoner is killed by guards.
- 2007 – Between 15,000 and 20,000 protesters march on Jena, Louisiana, United States, in support of six black youths who had been convicted of assaulting a white classmate.
- 2008 – A dump truck full of explosives detonates in front of the Marriott hotel in Islamabad, Pakistan, killing 54 people and injuring 266 others.
- 2011 – The United States military ends its "don't ask, don't tell" policy, allowing gay men and women to serve openly for the first time.
- 2017 – Hurricane Maria makes landfall in Puerto Rico as a powerful Category 4 hurricane, resulting in 2,975 deaths, US$90 billion in damage, and a major humanitarian crisis.
- 2018 – At least 161 people die after a ferry capsizes close to the pier on Ukara Island in Lake Victoria, Tanzania.
- 2019 – Roughly four million people, mostly students, demonstrate across the world to address climate change. Sixteen-year-old Greta Thunberg from Sweden leads the demonstration in New York City.

== Births ==
=== Pre-1600 ===
- 917 – Kyunyeo, Korean poet (died 973)
- 1161 – Emperor Takakura of Japan (died 1181)
- 1449 – Philipp I, Count of Hanau-Münzenberg (died 1500)
- 1486 – Arthur, Prince of Wales (died 1502)
- 1504 – Philip III, Count of Nassau-Weilburg (died 1559)
- 1514 – Philipp IV, Count of Hanau-Lichtenberg (died 1590)
- 1593 – Gottfried Scheidt, German organist and composer (died 1661)
- 1599 – Christian the Younger of Brunswick (died 1623)

=== 1601–1900 ===
- 1608 – Jean-Jacques Olier, French priest and mystic, founder of the Society of Saint-Sulpice (died 1657)
- 1614 – Martino Martini, Italian missionary, cartographer and historian (died 1661)
- 1685 – Giuseppe Matteo Alberti, Italian violinist and composer (died 1751)
- 1685 – Mateo de Toro Zambrano, 1st Count of La Conquista, President of the First Government Junta of Chile (died 1811)
- 1746 – Maurice, Count de Benyovszky, Slovak-Hungarian explorer (died 1786)
- 1758 – Jean-Jacques Dessalines, Haitian emperor (died 1806)
- 1778 – Fabian Gottlieb von Bellingshausen, Russian admiral, cartographer, and explorer (died 1852)
- 1800 – Benjamin Franklin White, American singer and composer (died 1879)
- 1815 – Richard Dry, Australian politician, 7th Premier of Tasmania (died 1869)
- 1819 – Frederick Ellsworth Sickels, American inventor (died 1895)
- 1820 – John F. Reynolds, American general (died 1863)
- 1831 – Kate Harrington, American poet and educator (died 1917)
- 1833 – Ernesto Teodoro Moneta, Italian soldier and journalist, Nobel Prize laureate (died 1918)
- 1842 – James Dewar, Scottish-English chemist and physicist (died 1923)
- 1844 – William H. Illingworth, English-American photographer (died 1893)
- 1847 – Susanna Rubinstein, Austrian psychologist (died 1914)
- 1851 – Henry Arthur Jones, English playwright and critic (died 1929)
- 1853 – Chulalongkorn, Siamese king (died 1910)
- 1861 – Herbert Putnam, American lawyer and publisher, 8th Librarian of Congress (died 1955)
- 1872 – Maurice Gamelin, French general (died 1958)
- 1873 – Sidney Olcott, Canadian-American actor, director, producer, and screenwriter (died 1949)
- 1873 – Ferenc Szisz, Hungarian race car driver (died 1944)
- 1875 – Matthias Erzberger, German publicist and politician (died 1921)
- 1876 – Carleton Ellis, American inventor and chemist (died 1941)
- 1878 – Upton Sinclair, American novelist, critic, and essayist (died 1968)
- 1878 – Francisco Lagos Cházaro, acting president of Mexico (died 1932)
- 1880 – Ildebrando Pizzetti, Italian composer, musicologist and critic (died 1968)
- 1884 – Maxwell Perkins, American editor (died 1947)
- 1885 – Enrico Mizzi, Maltese lawyer and politician, 6th Prime Minister of Malta (died 1950)
- 1886 – Charles Williams, English author, poet, and critic (died 1945)
- 1889 – Oskar Kaplur, Estonian wrestler (died 1962)
- 1889 – Charles Reidpath, American runner and general (died 1975)
- 1890 – Linda Eenpalu, Estonian activist and politician (died 1967)
- 1891 – Tomás Garrido Canabal, Mexican revolutionary (died 1943)
- 1893 – Colin Fraser Barron, Scottish-Canadian sergeant, Victoria Cross recipient (died 1958)
- 1893 – Hermann Lux, German footballer and manager (died 1962)
- 1895 – Walter Dubislav, German logician and philosopher of science (died 1937)
- 1899 – Leo Strauss, German-American political scientist, philosopher, and academic (died 1973)

=== 1901–present ===
- 1902 – Stevie Smith, English author and poet (died 1971)
- 1906 – Jean Dréville, French actor, director, producer, and screenwriter (died 1997)
- 1906 – Vera Faddeeva, Russian mathematician (died 1983)
- 1910 – Dorothy Vaughan, American mathematician (died 2008)
- 1913 – Sidney Dillon Ripley, American ornithologist and academic (died 2001)
- 1914 – Kenneth More, English actor (died 1982)
- 1915 – Malik Meraj Khalid, Pakistani politician, Prime Minister of Pakistan (died 2003)
- 1917 – Red Auerbach, American basketball player and coach (died 2006)
- 1917 – Olga Dahl, Swedish genealogist (died 2009)
- 1917 – Fernando Rey, Spanish actor (died 1994)
- 1917 – Clarice Taylor, American actress (died 2011)
- 1917 – Obdulio Varela, Uruguayan footballer (died 1996)
- 1920 – Jay Ward, American animator, producer, and screenwriter, founded Jay Ward Productions (died 1989)
- 1921 – Chico Hamilton, American drummer, composer, and bandleader (died 2013)
- 1923 – Maurice Sauvé, Canadian economist, academic, and politician (died 1992)
- 1924 – Gogi Grant, American singer (died 2016)
- 1924 – Hartini, wife of President Sukarno of Indonesia (died 2002)
- 1924 – Albert Marre, American director, and producer (died 2012)
- 1924 – Jackie Paris, American singer and guitarist (died 2004)
- 1925 – James Bernard, English composer and screenwriter (died 2001)
- 1925 – Ananda Mahidol, King Rama VIII of Thailand (died 1946)
- 1925 – Nelly Moretto, Argentine composer (died 1978)
- 1926 – Libero Liberati, Italian motorcycle racer (died 1962)
- 1927 – Colette Bonheur, Canadian singer (died 1966)
- 1927 – John Dankworth, English saxophonist, clarinet player, and composer (died 2010)
- 1927 – Red Mitchell, American bassist, composer, and poet (died 1992)
- 1927 – Rachel Roberts, Welsh actress (died 1980)
- 1928 – Alberto de Lacerda, Mozambican-Portuguese poet and radio host (died 2007)
- 1928 – Olga Ferri, Argentinian dancer and choreographer (died 2012)
- 1928 – Donald Hall, American poet, editor, and critic (died 2018)
- 1928 – Juarez Teixeira, Brazilian footballer (died 2026)
- 1929 – Anne Meara, American actress and playwright (died 2015)
- 1929 – Vittorio Taviani, Italian film director and screenwriter (died 2018)
- 1929 – Joe Temperley, Scottish saxophonist and clarinet player (died 2016)
- 1930 – Richard Montague, American mathematician and philosopher (died 1971)
- 1931 – Cherd Songsri, Thai director, producer, and screenwriter (died 2006)
- 1933 – Dennis Viollet, English footballer and manager (died 1999)
- 1934 – Hamit Kaplan, Turkish World and Olympic champion sports wrestler (died 1976)
- 1934 – Sophia Loren, Italian actress
- 1934 – David Marquand, Welsh academic and politician (died 2024)
- 1934 – Jeff Morris, American actor (died 2004)
- 1934 – Rajinder Puri, Indian cartoonist, journalist, and activist (died 2015)
- 1935 – David Pegg, English footballer (died 1958)
- 1935 – Keith Roberts, English author and illustrator (died 2000)
- 1935 – Jim Taylor, American football player and sportscaster (died 2018)
- 1936 – Andrew Davies, Welsh author, screenwriter, and producer
- 1936 – Salvador Reyes Monteón, Mexican footballer and manager (died 2012)
- 1937 – Birgitta Dahl, Swedish politician, Swedish Minister for the Environment
- 1937 – Garry Johnson, English general
- 1937 – Monica Zetterlund, Swedish actress and singer (died 2005)
- 1938 – Eric Gale, American guitarist and producer (died 1994)
- 1938 – Jane Manning, English soprano and educator (died 2021)
- 1940 – Tarō Asō, Japanese target shooter and politician, 92nd Prime Minister of Japan
- 1940 – William Finley, American actor (died 2012)
- 1940 – Anna Pavord, Welsh-English journalist and author
- 1941 – Dale Chihuly, American sculptor and educator
- 1941 – Sammy McMillan, Irish footballer
- 1942 – Rose Francine Rogombé, Gabonese lawyer and politician, President of Gabon (died 2015)
- 1944 – Paul Madeley, English footballer (died 2018)
- 1946 – Sant Rajinder Singh Ji Maharaj, Spiritual Master, Head of Science of Spirituality
- 1946 – Pete Coors, American businessman and politician
- 1946 – Markandey Katju, Indian lawyer and judge
- 1947 – Mia Martini, Italian singer (died 1995)
- 1947 – Patrick Poivre d'Arvor, French journalist and author
- 1948 – Rey Langit, Filipino journalist and radio host
- 1948 – Victoria Mallory, American singer and actress (died 2014)
- 1948 – George R. R. Martin, American novelist and short story writer
- 1948 – Chuck Panozzo, American bass player
- 1948 – John Panozzo, American drummer (died 1996)
- 1949 – Mahesh Bhatt, Indian director, producer, and screenwriter
- 1949 – Anthony Denison, American actor
- 1950 – Loredana Bertè, Italian singer
- 1950 – Matt Blair, American football player (died 2020)
- 1951 – Guy Lafleur, Canadian ice hockey player (died 2022)
- 1951 – Javier Marías, Spanish journalist, author, and academic (died 2022)
- 1951 – Debbi Morgan, American actress
- 1951 – Greg Valentine, American wrestler
- 1953 – Rocky Mattioli, Italian-Australian boxer
- 1953 – Steve Tom, American actor
- 1954 – Anne McIntosh, Scottish lawyer and politician
- 1954 – Henry Samueli, American businessman, co-founded Broadcom Corporation
- 1955 – Betsy Brantley, American actress
- 1955 – Johnny Kidd, English wrestler
- 1955 – Haim Moshe, Israeli singer
- 1955 – José Rivero, Spanish golfer
- 1956 – Jennifer Tour Chayes, American mathematician and computer scientist
- 1956 – Gary Cole, American actor
- 1956 – Steve Coleman, American saxophonist, composer, and bandleader
- 1956 – John Harle, English saxophonist, composer, conductor, and producer
- 1957 – Alannah Currie, New Zealand singer-songwriter
- 1957 – Michael Hurst, New Zealand actor and director
- 1957 – Vladimir Tkatchenko, Russian basketball player
- 1958 – Arn Anderson, American wrestler and trainer
- 1959 – Joseph Alessi, American trombonist and educator
- 1959 – Joanna Domańska, Polish pianist and educator
- 1959 – Meral Okay, Turkish actress, producer, and screenwriter (died 2012)
- 1960 – Lee Hall, English playwright and screenwriter
- 1960 – Dave Hemingway, English singer-songwriter and drummer
- 1960 – Deborah Roberts, American journalist
- 1961 – Lisa Bloom, American lawyer and journalist
- 1961 – Caroline Flint, English politician, Minister of State for Europe
- 1961 – Erwin Koeman, Dutch retired football player and coach
- 1962 – Jim Al-Khalili, Iraqi-English physicist, author, and academic
- 1963 – Anil Dalpat, Pakistani cricketer
- 1964 – Randy Bradbury, American bass player
- 1965 – Poul-Erik Høyer Larsen, Danish badminton player
- 1966 – Nuno Bettencourt, Portuguese singer-songwriter and guitarist
- 1967 – Roger Anderson, American wrestler
- 1967 – Martin Harrison, American football player
- 1967 – Kristen Johnston, American actress
- 1967 – Gunnar Nelson, American singer-songwriter and guitarist
- 1967 – Matthew Nelson, American singer-songwriter and bass player
- 1968 – Ijaz Ahmed, Pakistani cricketer and coach
- 1968 – Philippa Forrester, English television and radio presenter, producer and author
- 1968 – Leah Pinsent, Canadian actress
- 1968 – Darrell Russell, American race car driver (died 2004)
- 1968 – Norah Vincent, American writer (died 2022)
- 1969 – Patrick Pentland, Irish-Canadian singer-songwriter, guitarist, and producer
- 1969 – Tim Rogers, Australian singer-songwriter and guitarist
- 1969 – Ben Shepherd, American musician and songwriter
- 1969 – Richard Witschge, Dutch footballer and coach
- 1970 – N'Bushe Wright, American actress and dancer
- 1971 – Todd Blackadder, New Zealand rugby player and coach
- 1971 – Masashi Hamauzu, Japanese pianist and composer
- 1971 – Henrik Larsson, Swedish footballer and manager
- 1971 – Dominika Peczynski, Swedish singer and television host
- 1972 – Enuka Okuma, Canadian actress
- 1972 – Victor Ponta, Romanian jurist and politician, 63rd Prime Minister of Romania
- 1973 – Ronald McKinnon, American football player
- 1973 – Jo Pavey, English runner
- 1975 – Asia Argento, Italian actress
- 1975 – Moon Bloodgood, American actress
- 1975 – Joel Gertner, American wrestling announcer
- 1975 – Juan Pablo Montoya, Colombian race car driver
- 1975 – Jason Robinson, American saxophonist and composer
- 1976 – Jon Bernthal, American actor
- 1976 – Ainsley Earhardt, American political commentator
- 1977 – The-Dream, American singer, songwriter, and producer
- 1977 – Chris Mooney, American journalist and academic
- 1978 – Jason Bay, Canadian-American baseball player
- 1978 – Patrizio Buanne, Austrian-Italian singer-songwriter and producer
- 1978 – Héctor Camacho Jr., Puerto Rican-American boxer
- 1978 – Dante Hall, American football player
- 1978 – Sarit Hadad, Israeli singer
- 1978 – Scott Minto, Australian rugby league player
- 1978 – Charlie Weber, American actor
- 1979 – Crystle Stewart, American actress and beauty queen
- 1980 – Yung Joc, American rapper
- 1980 – Vladimir Karpets, Russian cyclist
- 1981 – Feliciano López, Spanish tennis player
- 1981 – David McMillan, American football player (died 2013)
- 1981 – Ryan Tandy, Australian rugby league player (died 2014)
- 1981 – Jordan Tata, American baseball player
- 1982 – Jason Bacashihua, American ice hockey player
- 1982 – Aaron Burkart, German race car driver
- 1982 – Brian Fortuna, American dancer and choreographer
- 1982 – Inna Osypenko-Radomska, Ukrainian-Azerbaijani sprint kayaker
- 1982 – Sexy Star, Mexican wrestler
- 1982 – Athanasios Tsigas, Greek footballer
- 1983 – Sancho Lyttle, Vincentian-Spanish basketball player
- 1983 – Freya Ross, Scottish runner
- 1983 – Ángel Sánchez, Puerto Rican baseball player
- 1984 – Brian Joubert, French figure skater
- 1985 – Ian Desmond, American baseball player
- 1985 – Mami Yamasaki, Japanese model and actress
- 1986 – Hayato Fujita, Japanese wrestler
- 1986 – Aldis Hodge, American actor
- 1986 – İbrahim Kaş, Turkish footballer
- 1986 – Jason Nightingale, New Zealand rugby league player
- 1986 – A. J. Ramos, American baseball player
- 1987 – Gain, South Korean singer
- 1987 – Jack Lawless, American drummer
- 1987 – Tito Tebaldi, Italian rugby player
- 1988 – Sergei Bobrovsky, Russian ice hockey player
- 1988 – Coby Fleener, American football player
- 1988 – Khabib Nurmagomedov, Russian mixed martial artist
- 1988 – Ayano Ōmoto, Japanese singer and dancer
- 1988 – Ryan Simpkins, Australian rugby league player
- 1990 – Ken Giles, American baseball player
- 1990 – Carlos Hyde, American football player
- 1990 – Donatas Motiejūnas, Lithuanian basketball player
- 1990 – Phillip Phillips, American singer-songwriter and guitarist
- 1990 – John Tavares, Canadian ice hockey player
- 1991 – Isaac Cofie, Ghanaian footballer
- 1992 – Michał Żyro, Polish footballer
- 1993 – Kyle Anderson, American-Chinese basketball player
- 1993 – Julian Draxler, German footballer
- 1994 – Ryan Hartman, American ice hockey player
- 1995 – Laura Dekker, Dutch sailor
- 1995 – Sammi Hanratty, American actress
- 1995 – Rob Holding, English footballer
- 1996 – Ioana Loredana Roșca, Romanian tennis player
- 1997 – Itamar Einhorn, Israeli Olympic cyclist
- 1997 – Nathan Knight, American basketball player
- 1998 – Trevon Diggs, American football player
- 2003 – Thomas Matthew Crooks, American attempted assassin of Donald Trump (died 2024)

== Deaths ==
=== Pre-1600 ===
- 855 – Gozbald, bishop of Würzburg
- 1085 – Hermann II, Count Palatine of Lotharingia (born 1049)
- 1190 – Adelog of Hildesheim, German bishop
- 1241 – Conrad II of Salzwedel, German nobleman and bishop
- 1246 – Michael of Chernigov (born 1185)
- 1266 – Jan Prandota, Bishop of Kraków
- 1328 – Ibn Taymiyyah, Syrian theologian and scholar (born 1263)
- 1384 – Louis I, Duke of Anjou (born 1339)
- 1440 – Frederick I, Elector of Brandenburg (born 1371)
- 1460 – Gilles Binchois, Flemish composer (born 1400)
- 1492 – Anne Neville, Countess of Warwick (born 1426)
- 1501 – Agostino Barbarigo, Doge of Venice
- 1501 – Thomas Grey, 1st Marquess of Dorset, stepson of Edward IV of England (born 1457)
- 1533 – Veit Stoss, German sculptor (born c. 1447)
- 1537 – Pavle Bakić, medieval Serb monarch; last Serb Despot
- 1565 – Cipriano de Rore, Flemish composer and teacher (born 1515)
- 1586 – Sir Anthony Babington, English Catholic conspirator (born 1561)
- 1586 – Chidiock Tichborne, English conspirator and poet (born 1558)
- 1590 – Lodovico Agostini, Italian priest, composer, and scholar (born 1534)

=== 1601–1900 ===
- 1625 – Heinrich Meibom, German historian and poet (born 1555)
- 1627 – Jan Gruter, Dutch scholar and critic (born 1560)
- 1639 – Johannes Meursius, Dutch historian and scholar (born 1579)
- 1643 – Lucius Cary, 2nd Viscount Falkland, English soldier and politician, Secretary of State for England (born 1610)
- 1684 – Kim Seok-ju, Korean scholar and politician (born 1634)
- 1740 – Francis Scobell, English politician (born 1664)
- 1793 – Fletcher Christian, English lieutenant and mutineer (born 1764)
- 1803 – Robert Emmet, Irish republican (born 1780)
- 1815 – Nicolas Desmarest, French geologist and scholar (born 1725)
- 1839 – Sir Thomas Hardy, 1st Baronet, English admiral (born 1769)
- 1840 – José Gaspar Rodríguez de Francia, Paraguayan lawyer and politician, Consul of Paraguay (born 1766)
- 1845 – Matvei Gedenschtrom, Russian explorer and public servant (born 1780)
- 1852 – Philander Chase, American bishop and educator, founded Kenyon College (born 1775)
- 1855 – José Trinidad Reyes, Honduran priest and educator (born 1797)
- 1863 – Jacob Grimm, German philologist and mythologist (born 1785)
- 1884 – Leopold Fitzinger, Austrian zoologist and author (born 1802)
- 1898 – Theodor Fontane, German author and poet (born 1819)

=== 1901–present ===
- 1906 – Robert R. Hitt, American politician, 13th United States Assistant Secretary of State (born 1834)
- 1908 – Pablo de Sarasate, Spanish violinist and composer (born 1844)
- 1927 – George Nichols, American actor, director, and screenwriter (born 1864)
- 1930 – Gombojab Tsybikov, Russian anthropologist and explorer (born 1873)
- 1932 – Francisco S. Carvajal, Mexican lawyer and politician, president 1914 (born 1870)
- 1933 – Annie Besant, English theosophist and activist (born 1847)
- 1939 – Paul Bruchési, Canadian archbishop (born 1855)
- 1942 – Kārlis Ulmanis, Latvian prime minister and president (born 1877)
- 1945 – Augusto Tasso Fragoso, Brazilian politician, President of Brazil (born 1869)
- 1945 – William Seabrook, American occultist, journalist, and explorer (born 1884)
- 1945 – Eduard Wirths, German physician (born 1909)
- 1947 – Fiorello H. La Guardia, American lawyer and politician, 99th Mayor of New York City (born 1882)
- 1947 – Jantina Tammes, Dutch biologist, geneticist, and academic (born 1871)
- 1957 – Heino Kaski, Finnish pianist and composer (born 1885)
- 1957 – Jean Sibelius, Finnish violinist and composer (born 1865)
- 1970 – Alexandros Othonaios, Greek general and politician, 126h Prime Minister of Greece (born 1879)
- 1971 – Giorgos Seferis, Greek poet and diplomat, Nobel Prize laureate (born 1900)
- 1971 – James Westerfield, American actor (born 1913)
- 1972 – Pierre-Henri Simon, French historian and author (born 1903)
- 1973 – Jim Croce, American singer-songwriter and guitarist (born 1943)
- 1975 – Saint-John Perse, French poet and diplomat, Nobel Prize laureate (born 1887)
- 1979 – Ludvík Svoboda, Czech general and politician, 8th President of Czechoslovakia (born 1895)
- 1984 – Steve Goodman, American singer-songwriter and guitarist (born 1948)
- 1987 – Michael Stewart, American playwright and composer (born 1924)
- 1993 – Erich Hartmann, German soldier and pilot (born 1922)
- 1994 – Abioseh Nicol, Sierra Leonean physician, academic, and diplomat (born 1924)
- 1994 – Jule Styne, American composer (born 1905)
- 1996 – Paul Erdős, Hungarian-Polish mathematician and academic (born 1913)
- 1996 – Reuben Kamanga, Zambian politician, 1st Vice-President of Zambia (born 1929)
- 1996 – Paul Weston, American pianist, composer, and conductor (born 1912)
- 1999 – Robert Lebel, Canadian businessman (born 1905)
- 2000 – Gherman Titov, Russian general, pilot, and astronaut (born 1935)
- 2002 – Sergei Bodrov Jr., Russian actor, director, and screenwriter (born 1971)
- 2003 – Simon Muzenda, Zimbabwean politician, 1st Vice-President of Zimbabwe (born 1922)
- 2003 – Gareth Williams, Baron Williams of Mostyn, Welsh lawyer and politician, Lord President of the Council (born 1941)
- 2004 – Brian Clough, English footballer and manager (born 1935)
- 2004 – Townsend Hoopes, American soldier and historian (born 1922)
- 2005 – Simon Wiesenthal, Austrian human rights activist, Holocaust survivor (born 1908)
- 2006 – Armin Jordan, Swiss conductor (born 1932)
- 2006 – Sven Nykvist, Swedish director, producer, and cinematographer (born 1922)
- 2006 – John W. Peterson, American pilot and songwriter (born 1921)
- 2007 – Johnny Gavin, Irish footballer (born 1928)
- 2010 – Leonard Skinner, American soldier and educator (born 1933)
- 2011 – Oscar Handlin, American historian and author (born 1915)
- 2011 – Burhanuddin Rabbani, Afghan academic and politician, 10th President of Afghanistan (born 1940)
- 2012 – Fortunato Baldelli, Italian cardinal (born 1935)
- 2012 – Richard H. Cracroft, American author and academic (born 1936)
- 2012 – Tereska Torrès, French soldier and author (born 1920)
- 2013 – James B. Vaught, American general (born 1926)
- 2013 – Gilles Verlant, Belgian journalist and critic (born 1957)
- 2014 – Anatoly Berezovoy, Russian colonel, pilot, and cosmonaut (born 1942)
- 2014 – Polly Bergen, American actress and singer (born 1930)
- 2014 – Takako Doi, Japanese scholar and politician (born 1928)
- 2014 – George Sluizer, French-Dutch director, producer, and screenwriter (born 1932)
- 2015 – Mario Caiano, Italian director, producer, and screenwriter (born 1933)
- 2015 – Jagmohan Dalmiya, Indian businessman (born 1940)
- 2015 – Jack Larson, American actor (born 1928)
- 2016 – Curtis Hanson, American film director and screenwriter (born 1945)
- 2016 – Peter Leo Gerety, American bishop (born 1912)
- 2023 – Maddy Cusack, English football player (born 1995)
- 2024 – Ibrahim Aqil, Hezbollah militant (born 1962)
- 2024 – Kathryn Crosby, American actress and singer (born 1933)
- 2024 – Daniel J. Evans, American politician, 16th Governor of Washington (born 1925)
- 2024 – Sayuri, Japanese musician (born 1996)
- 2024 – Cleo Sylvestre, English actress (born 1945)
- 2024 – Eduardo Xol, American designer and author (born 1966)
- 2025 – Matt Beard, English football manager (born 1978)
- 2026 – Chad Gilbert, American musician, songwriter, and producer (born 1981)

== Holidays and observances ==
- Christian feast day:
  - Eustace (Western Christianity)
  - Evilasius
  - Fausta of Cyzicus
  - Glycerius of Milan
  - Jean-Charles Cornay (one of Vietnamese Martyrs)
  - John Coleridge Patteson (commemoration, Anglicanism)
  - José Maria de Yermo y Parres
  - Korean Martyrs, including Andrew Kim Taegon and Laurent-Marie-Joseph Imbert
  - Theodore, Philippa and companions
  - Blessed Thomas Johnson
  - Vincent Madelgarius (Maelceadar)
  - September 20 (Eastern Orthodox liturgics)
- Constitution Day (Nepal)
- Independence Day of South Ossetia (not fully recognized)
- National Youth Day (Thailand)
- Oil Workers' Day (Azerbaijan)
- Universal Children's Day (Germany)
