= Shamim Karhani =

Indian Urdu poet (1913–1975)

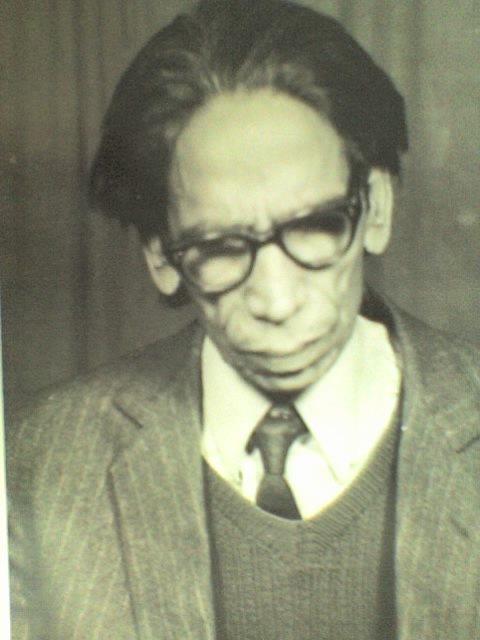
- Shamim Karhani
- Born: Syed Shamsuddin Haider; 8 June 1913; Karhan, United Provinces of Agra and Oudh, British India now in Mau district, Uttar Pradesh, India
- Died: 19 March 1975 (aged 61); New Delhi, India
- Citizenship: Indian
- Occupations: Poet, teacher
- Writing career
- Language: Urdu
- Notable works: Burq-o-Baaran, Roshan Andhera, Aks-i-Gul, Zulfiqaar, Harf-i-Neem Shab
- Literary movement: Progressive Writers' Movement

Shamim Karhani (Urdu: شمیم کرہانی; 8 June 1913 – 19 March 1975), born Syed Shamsuddin Haider, was an Indian Urdu poet (Shayar) associated with the Progressive Writers' Movement. He wrote ghazals, nazms, patriotic songs, elegiac poems and literary translations. His poetry is associated with the Indian independence movement, opposition to the partition of India, opposition to the two-nation theory, and the progressive tradition in modern Urdu literature.

== Early life and education ==
Shamim Karhani was born on 8 June 1913 in Karhan, then in the United Provinces of Agra and Oudh, British India. Karhan is in the Mau–Azamgarh region of eastern Uttar Pradesh; the present Mau district was created as a separate district in 1988.

He was born into a zamindar family. His father was Syed Muhammad Akhtar and his mother was Ummat ul Zehra. His brothers included Syed Ghazanfar Husain, Syed Azam Husain Azam, Syed Hasamuddin Haider, and Syed Ali Haider Husaini. His elder brother Syed Azam Husain Azam was also an Urdu poet and journalist.

His birth name was Syed Shamsuddin Haider. He adopted the pen name Shamim Karhani, using “Karhani” after his native village, in keeping with a common convention in Urdu literary culture.

He received his secondary education from Aligarh Muslim University and also completed the qualification known as Maulvi Kamil Munshi.

== Career ==
Karhani worked mainly as a teacher. He taught in Azamgarh, spent a short period as a lyricist in Bombay, and later moved to Delhi. He was associated with the Dayanand Anglo-Vedic Schools System, Qaumi Awaz, and Anglo Arabic School in New Delhi.

In 1950, he joined Anglo Arabic Higher Secondary School in Delhi as a Persian teacher and remained associated with the school until the end of his career. Although he had a background in Persian, his literary work was primarily in Urdu. He also translated Hindi fiction and English poems for children into Urdu.

== Poetry and literary position ==
Karhani began writing poetry at an early age and is said to have composed his first couplet at the age of eight. His first collection, Burq-o-Baaran, was published in 1939. His later works included Taraaney, Roshan Andhera, Aks-i-Gul, Zulfiqaar, Harf-i-Neem Shab, Jaan-i-Baraadar and Subh-i-Faaran.

He belonged to the circle of Progressive Urdu poets. The Report of the Committee for Promotion of Urdu 1975 lists him among Progressive poets such as Faiz Ahmad Faiz, Majaz Lucknawi, Ali Sardar Jafri, Jan Nisar Akhtar, Makhdoom Mohiuddin and Ali Jawad Zaidi. His association with the Progressive Writers' Movement is also noted in later literary accounts.

Karhani was a contemporary of poets such as Faiz Ahmad Faiz, Ali Sardar Jafri, Majaz Lucknawi, Moin Ahsan Jazbi and Ali Jawad Zaidi. He wrote in several Urdu poetic forms, including ghazal, nazm, geet, qita, rubai and elegiac poetry. His archived corpus includes ghazals, nazms, individual shers, audio recordings, videos and digitised books.

Karhani also taught Urdu prosody. Darshan Singh later studied the techniques of Urdu poetry with Sufi Ghulam Mustafa Tabassum and Shamim Karhani.

In a 1965 survey of Urdu literature published in Indian Literature, Ali Jawad Zaidi noted that Karhani’s collection Aks-i-Gul was marked by enthusiasm for human liberty and progress.

== Nationalist poetry, anti-colonial writing and opposition to Partition ==
Karhani’s nationalist poetry circulated during the period of the Indian independence movement. His revolutionary nazms and naghmas were sung in prabhat pheris in north Indian cities such as Lucknow and Varanasi during the independence movement. His poetry is discussed in Gopi Chand Narang’s study of Urdu poetry and India’s freedom struggle.

His collection Roshan Andhera has been described as devoted to the Quit India Movement. The work is also catalogued as Raushan Andhera with a 1946 publication date.

Karhani opposed the demand for Pakistan and the division of India on religious lines. His poem Pakistan chahne walon se (“To those who want Pakistan”), written in the context of the Pakistan Movement, addressed supporters of Pakistan and argued against the Partition of India. The poem was included in Ali Jawad Zaidi’s anthology Urdu Mein Qaumi Sha'iri Ke Sau Saal and later in Jan Nisar Akhtar’s anthology Hindostan Hamara.

The poem has also been discussed in later studies of Urdu poetry’s role in opposition to Partition and nationalist writing. A 2018 study of nationalism in Urdu poetry treats Pakistan chahne walon se as an example of Urdu poetry directed toward a united India and against Partition. The study states that the poem criticised and warned supporters of Pakistan about the consequences of Partition.

One of Karhani’s best-known later nationalist poems is Jagao Na Bapu Ko Neend Aa Gayi Hai, written after the assassination of Mahatma Gandhi in 1948. After hearing Karhani recite the poem, Jawaharlal Nehru invited him to Lucknow to recite at Indian National Congress election meetings.

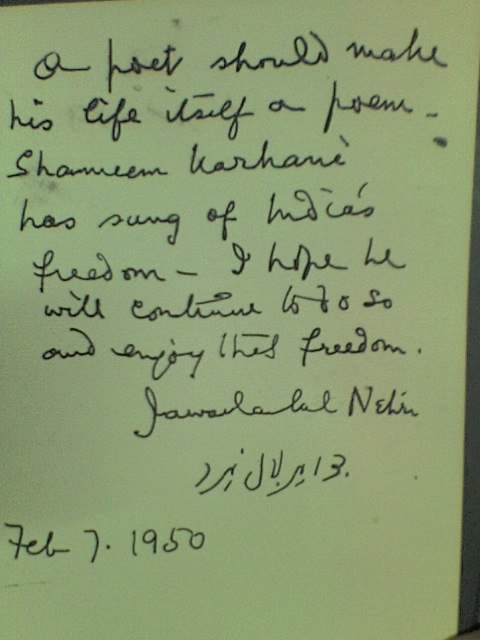
A note written by Jawaharlal Nehru in Shamim Karhani's diary, dated 7 February 1950.

Karhani moved to Delhi in 1950 and met Nehru at Teen Murti. Nehru asked him to compose an epic in Urdu on the freedom movement of India. He also received a stipend for the work; later literary accounts describe the stipend as having been paid from Nehru’s personal funds.

On 7 February 1950, Nehru wrote in Karhani’s diary: “A poet should make his life itself a poem. Shamim Karhani has sung of India's freedom. I hope he will continue to do so and enjoy this freedom.”

== Works ==
- Burq-o-Baaran (1939)
- Roshan Andhera / Raushan Andhera (1942/1946)
- Taraaney / Tarane (1944)
- Badh Chal Re Hindustan (1948)
- Tameer (1948)
- Aks-i-Gul / Aks-e-Gul (1962)
- Intekhaab-i-Kalaam-i-Shamim Karhani (1963)
- Zulfiqaar / Zulfiqar (1964)
- Ranga Ke Aur Geet / Ranga Ke Geet (1965)
- Harf-i-Neem Shab / Harf-e-Neem-e-Shab (1972)
- Jaan-i-Baraadar / Jaan-e-Biraadar: Ehtesham Hussain Par Marka Aaraa Nazam (1973)
- Subh-i-Faaran / Subh-e-Faaran (1974)
- Main Bootarabi (1974)
- Kileed-i-Insha
- Pushp Chhaya, Hindi translation of Aks-i-Gul

A later selected edition, Intikhab-e-Kalam Shameem Karhani, was published in 1999. The title Intekhab Shamim Karhani was also listed in a 1989 Lok Sabha written-answer record concerning Urdu publications.

== Awards and recognition ==
Karhani received an award from the Government of Uttar Pradesh for Aks-i-Gul in 1964. He received an award from the Uttar Pradesh Urdu Academy for Harf-i-Neem Shab in 1972. He also received the Saroop Narayan Urdu Nazm Award in 1972 and a Government of India award for Ranga Ke Geet.

== Death ==
Karhani died in New Delhi on 19 March 1975.

== See also ==
- Mir Fida Hussain
- Darshan Singh (spiritual master)
- Progressive Writers' Movement
- Urdu poetry
- Indian independence movement
- Opposition to the partition of India
- Two-nation theory
- Partition of India
