= Ali Jawad Zaidi =

Indian Urdu poet, scholar and author (1916–2004)

Syed Ali Jawad Zaidi
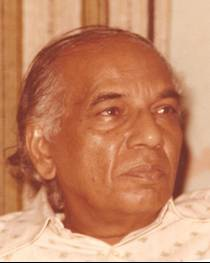
- Ali Jawad Zaidi
- Born: 10 March 1916; India
- Died: 6 December 2004 (aged 88)
- Occupations: Poet; scholar; author; lawyer; civil servant
- Children: 7
- Relatives: Annie Zaidi (writer) (Grandchild)
- Writing career
- Language: Urdu, Persian, Arabic
- Genres: Poetry; Prose
- Subjects: Urdu literature; Marsiya

Syed Ali Jawad Zaidi (10 March 1916 – 6 December 2004) was an Indian Urdu poet, scholar, and author of over 80 books in several languages. He was also an Indian independence activist, lawyer and later a civil servant, but is best known for his work in Urdu literature.

He was an authority on marsiyago poetry of Uttar Pradesh, including the poets Mir Anis and Mirza Ghalib, and wrote on both poetry and prose, including research and analytical works.

He has received several awards for his contributions to literature and other fields.

== Early life and education ==
Zaidi was born in the village Karhan, Uttar Pradesh, then in Azamgarh district (now Mau district) in eastern Uttar Pradesh, the eldest of six children in a zamindar family of Mohammadabad-Gohna, Azamgarh. He was born at his maternal grandfather's home in Karhan. Belonging to a Saiyid family and being the eldest son in his family, he was sent to the local Arabic madrasa to gain education and proficiency in Islamic theology and religious matters.

When Zaidi was 11 years old, his father died. His early formal education took place in Mahmudabad, the princely state. He then graduated from Government Jubilee College, Lucknow and an LLB from Lucknow University).

== Indian independence activism ==
During his graduation and later while doing his LLB, he came into contact with leaders of the Indian independence movement, which he joined in the late 1930s. He wrote revolutionary poetry while he led the student's movement along with other student leaders such as Shankar Dayal Sharma, who later went on to become the president of India. His poetry drew praise from Sarojini Naidu, and he was subsequently elected as the secretary-general of the All India Student's Federation. He remained the secretary-general of the All India Students Federation during the Quit India Movement (1942) launched by Mahatma Gandhi.

His poems were proscribed by the British Colonial Government for inciting rebellion against the British Raj. The British government issued an arrest warrant in order to stop him from organising student rallies and mobilising students against the Raj. He continued his work underground, organising students throughout India. He was later arrested at Nagpur, and was sentenced to jail for anti-British activity and sent to serve his term at the Nagpur Central Prison and later transferred to the Benares Central Jail.

He was laid to rest at the Malka Jahan burial grounds, Lucknow, India, with full state honours provided to an Indian freedom fighter.

== Government service ==
With India's independence, Zaidi ended his active involvement in politics. He joined the Information Department of the Government of Uttar Pradesh and was a deputy director there until he was inducted into the Indian Information Service and posted to Srinagar.

Although he had taken up Government Service for a full-time job, and chosen that as a career, he remained active in arts and cultural activities in Jammu and Kashmir, organising and conducting the annual Kashmir festival during the summer months. He was appointed as the secretary general of the Society of Arts and Culture, Government of Jammu and Kashmir.

In the early 1960s he was transferred to Delhi and posted with the Press Information Bureau in Delhi and Mumbai. His final posting was in Tehran and he retired from active Government service as Joint Director, News Services, All India Radio in August 1978.

Zaidi was a secularist and nationalist. He was a member of the Inder Kumar Gujral Committee for promotion of Urdu.

He also worked as the editor of Naya Daur, an Urdu monthly digest, and Al-Ilm, a monthly published from Mumbai. Naya Daur ran a series on his memoirs on a monthly basis for a time, as well as a special issue in his memory of Ali Jawad Zaidi (Nov/Dec issue, 2004) after his death. He also did some translation work (into English) for the Sahitya Akademi.

He travelled extensively in India and abroad, often working with heads of state and other high-ranking officials. He was friends with Darshan Singh of the Sawan Kirpal Ruhani Mission.

== Writing career ==
Throughout his years with the government, Zaidi continued writing. Seven of his books have won State Government Awards. He was the author of over 80 books in Urdu, English, Hindi and Persian. Many of his works are now reference material for research students. He has been the subject of research scholars, and Doctor of Philosophy degrees have been awarded to four students for research done on his life and works.

He was president of the Uttar Pradesh Urdu Academy, Lucknow and as the president of the Zainabbiya Institute of Islamic Studies, Mumbai, and was on the board of Sahitya Akademi, New Delhi and the Sangeet and Natya Akademi, New Delhi and other social, literary and cultural organizations. He was also an advisor to the Government of Uttar Pradesh.

His books are included in the U.S. Library of Congress.

Amongst his notable works are Qasida Nigaran-e-Uttar Pradesh (in 2 Volumes), Uttar Pradesh ke Marsiyago (in 2 Volumes) & Do Adabi School, which have been published in Urdu-speaking Pakistan as well. These books along with his History of Urdu Literature (English), Mirza Ghalib – Ek Parichay (Hindi), Mir Anis, are unique in their approaches to their subjects.

Zaidi was a member of the progressive Urdu literature movement, other members of which included Ali Sardar Jafri and Kaifi Azmi. His poetic contemporaries included Majaz, Faiz, and Qurratulain Hyder.

He was also a member of the Committee for Promotion of Urdu (appointed by the Government of India Resolution No. F. 15-25/72-L. 1 dated 5 May 1972)

Confined to his home in Lucknow due to poor health and failing eyesight during his last years, he wrote using an amanuensis. He died on 6 December 2004.

== Awards ==
The Government of India conferred on him the Padma Shri in recognition of his contributions to Urdu literature (1988). He also received a Tamra Patra award for his role in the freedom movement, and the Ghalib award.

Other awards included:

- Anis Award in recognition of Expertise on Mir Anis
- Ghalib Award in recognition of Expertise on Mirza Ghalib
- Certificate of Honour presented by The Rotary Club, Lucknow
- Awards presented to his various books by Governments and Literary Organizations are marked in the list of his books below.

In 1987, Zaidi asked government bodies and literary organizations not to consider his works for awards.

The Jawad Memorial Prize was instituted in his remembrance in 2019 for awarding outstanding translations of Urdu works to English.

== List of published books ==
(Books marked by an ‘*’ are award-winning books) authored by Saiyid Ali Jawad Zaidi

1. Meri Gazalain 1959 * Poetry
2. Teesha-e-Awaaz 1985 Poetry
3. Uttar Pradesh Ke Marsiyago Research
4. Do Adbi School 1970 * Critical Analysis
5. Naath Nigari Uttar Pradesh mein Research & analysis
6. Zabt Shuda Nazmein Collection of Proscribed Poems
7. Urdu Main Qaumi Shairi Ke Sau Saal 1957 Criticism & analysis
8. History of Urdu Literature 1993 Research & Analysis
9. Mir Anis (Tr. English) 1986 Biography
10. Rang-e-sang 1944 Poetry
11. Dayar-e-Sahar 1960 Poetry
12. Naseem-e-Dasht-e-Arzoo 1980 * Poetry
13. Inteqhab Ali Jawad Zaidi 1971 Poetry
14. Silsila (Inteqhab) 1990 Poetry
15. Warq Warq Zanjeer 1990 Poetry
16. Dhoop Chaaon 1994 Poetry
17. Urdu Main Shairi Ke Sau Saal (Muqqadame ke saath) 1981 Criticism & analysis
18. Hamari Quami Shairi Criticism & analysis
19. Taamiri Adab 1959 * Criticism & analysis
20. Anwaar-e-Abu Al Kalaam 1959
21. Hindustan Mein Islami Uloom Ke Marakaz 1972
22. Fikr-o-Riyaz 1975 * Collection of Muqalaat
23. Tareekh-e-Adab Urdu Ki Tadween 1976 Research
24. Qasida Nigaran-e-Uttar Pradesh 1978 Research
25. Tarrek Adab Ki Tadween (Vol II) 1983 Research
26. Do Aadabi Ischool (Revised Edition) 1980 Critical Analysis
27. Qasida Nigaran-e-Uttar Pradesh (Vol II) 1983 Research & analysis
28. Masnavi Nigari 1985 Research & analysis
29. Diwan-e-Ghani 1964 Research & analysis
30. Zikr-o-Fikr Ghani 1966 Silsila Muqalaat
31. Nasr Nigari Uttar Pradesh Mein Research & analysis
32. Do aadabi Ischool (Pakistan edition) 1988 Critical Analysis
33. Hindustan Mein Arabi Ki Taweej Research & analysis
34. Kamal-e-Abu Kalam 1989 Collection of articles
35. Mir Anis (Hindi) Biography
36. Ghalib – Ek Parichay (Hindi) 1969 Biography
37. Tareek-e-Mushaira 1992 Research
38. Malik Ram Ek Mutaalah 1987 Biography
39. Islami Taraqqi Pasandi
40. Dehalvi Marsiyago – Vol I 1982 * Research & Analysis
41. Dehalvi Marsiyago – Vol II 1987 * Research & Analysis
42. Anis Ke Salaam 1981 Collection
43. Rubiyaat-e-Anis 1985 Collection
44. Mir Anis 1991 Collection & Short biography
45. Jadeed Marsiye Ka Baani – Mir Zamir Laknawi
46. Adbiyaat Kashmiri 1994
47. Mahatma Gandhi (Urdu) 1986 Translation from English
48. Diwan Shams Tabraizi Ki Seer (Urdu) Translation from Persian
49. Islami Para Para
50. Aap Se Miliye 1963 * Sketches
51. Humsaaya 1985 Sketches
52. Hum Qaabila 1990 Sketches
53. Ehl-e-Qaabila Sketches
54. Yaadon Ke Rahguzar Memoirs
55. Nazr Collection of articles
56. Inteqaab-e-Rind, Anthology 1983
57. Payaam-e-Aazadi 1947
58. Naghma-e-aazadi (Urdu) 1957 Collection of Poems
59. Naghma-e-aazadi (Hindi) 1957 Collection of Poems
60. Zaidi ke Tafsare Collection
61. Zaidi Ke Muqadmaat Collection
62. An Experiment in Communication Planning 1970 Research & Analysis
63. Lucknow ka dabistan-e-shairi, Urdu Markaz, 1971
64. Urdu mein Ram Kathan (Research)
65. Annotations to Gani Kashmiri's poetry collection (Compiled by Amin Daraab Kashmiri); J&K Academy of art, culture & languages
66. Human Interest Stories 1970
67. Malik Ram Felicitation Volume 1972
68. The Prophet's Daughter Historical Research (Ready but Unpublished)
69. Urdu Press in Bihar & Bengal 1978 Research & Analysis
70. Mortality & Growth in Urdu Press 1978 Research & Analysis
71. All India Students Conference, Golden Jubilee Celebrations 1986
72. A Short History of Student Movement Historical Research
73. Paro 2005 Long Poem Published by Anwar Zaidi's efforts
74. Annual Report (1961–62) J&K, Academy of Arts, Culture & Languages 1962 Report
75. Report of the I K Gujral Committee for the Promotion of Urdu (In 2 Vols.) 1975 Report

Zaidi himself has been the subject of research in several publications:

1. Ali Jawad Zaidi, by Saikh Abdur Rehman, 1999
2. Ali Jawad Zaidi, Hindustan Adab ke Mehmur, Sahitya Acedamy, by Wazahat Hussain Rizvi, 2012
3. Naya Daur, Shumara Number-008,009, by Wazahat Hussain Rizvi
4. Ali jawad Zaidi aur sheeraza Kashmir (research), presented at Ali Jawad Zaidi - Fun aur shakshiyat; by Dr. Mohd. Rashid Azeez

== List of unpublished works ==
The Prophet's Daughter Historical Research (Ready but Unpublished)

Urdu Mein Ramkatha Research on the Ramayanas written in the Urdu language
