= Darshan Singh =

Darshan Singh may refer to:

- Darshan Singh (field hockey) (born 1938), Indian field hockey player
- Darshan Singh (spiritual master) (1921–1989), founder of Sawan Kirpal Ruhani Mission
- Darshan Singh Canadian (1917–1986), trade union activist and communist organizer in Canada and India
- Qila Darshan Singh, a village in Punjab, India

== See also ==
- List of people with surname Singh
- Darshan (disambiguation)
