= Darshan =

Darshan, a Sanskrit word meaning "sight" or "viewing", may refer to:

== Ceremony and religion ==
- Darshan (Indian religions), the auspicious sight of a divine image or holy person; also a school of Hindu philosophy
- Darshan (Judaism), a Scriptural interpreter
- Jharokha Darshan, in medieval India, the display of a ruler to his court or the public
- A type of maggid, a traditional Eastern European Jewish religious itinerant preacher

== Arts and entertainment ==
- Darshan (1967 film), an East Pakistani film directed by Rehman
- Darshan (2004 film), an Indian Kannada-language film directed by Ramesh Kitty
- Darshan (band), an American Jewish hip hop group
- Darshan (The Road to Graceland), a 1993 album by David Sylvian and Robert Fripp
- Darshan, a 1997 album by Shehzad Roy
- Darshan, an Indian reality TV show on Colors Marathi

== People ==
- Darshan (Kannada actor) (born 1977), Indian actor in Kannada films
- Darshan (Tamil actor) (born 1991), Indian actor in Tamil films
- Darshan (video game player) (born 1994), Canadian League of Legends player
- Darshan Kang (born 1951), Canadian politician
- Darshan Punshi, Pakistani politician, active from 2008
- Darshan Ranganathan (1941–2001), Indian organic chemist
- Darshan Singh (executioner), Singaporean executioner
- Darshan Singh (field hockey) (born 1938), Indian field hockey player
- Darshan Singh Awara (1906–1982), Indian poet
- Darshan Singh Canadian (1917–1986), Sikh trade union activist and Communist organizer

== Other uses ==
- Darshan Academy, a group of private high schools based in India

== See also ==
- Darshan Singh (disambiguation)
- Darshana (disambiguation)
