= Darshana (disambiguation) =

In Indian religions, darshana is the auspicious sight of a deity or a holy person.

Darshana may also refer to:

== People ==
- Darshana Das, Indian actress
- Darshana Banik, Indian actress
- Darshana Gupta, wedding organizer
- Darshana Jardosh (born 1961), Indian politician and Minister
- Darshana Jhaveri (born 1940), Indian dancer
- Darshana KT (born 1984), musical artist
- Darshana Mahawatte (born 1990), Sri Lankan cricketer
- Darshana Rajendran, Indian actress and singer
- Darshana Sandakalum (born 1986), Sri Lankan cricketer
- Darshana Singh (born 1974), Indian politician
- Aruna Darshana (born 1999), Sri Lankan sprinter
- Ranju Darshana (born 1996), Nepalese social activist and politician
- Darshana Dinesh Dinanath Korma Pinto (born 1996), Sri Lankan Dancer From Negombo

== Other uses ==
- Darshana, Chuadanga, Khulna Division, Bangladesh
  - Darshana land port
  - Darshana railway station
- Darshana (Hinduism), term in Hindu philosophy
- Darshana Upanishad, Sanskrit text

== See also ==
- Darshan (disambiguation)
