= Sawan Kirpal Ruhani Mission =

Spiritual organization

- Founder: Darshan Singh
- Type: Spiritual, Non-Profit Organization
- Headquarters: Delhi, India
- Leader: Rajinder Singh

Sawan Kirpal Ruhani Mission is a non-profit, spiritual organization.

It is currently headed by Rajinder Singh. The headquarters of Sawan Kirpal Ruhani Mission (SKRM) are based in Delhi, India.

== Overview ==
The terminology of "Sawan Kirpal Ruhani Mission", refers to spiritual mission led by Baba Sawan Singh, second spiritual master of Radha Soami Satsang Beas and Sant Kirpal Singh, another spiritual master in Radha Soami Tradition.

Sawan Kirpal Ruhani Mission, currently headed by Rajinder Singh, is dedicated to spirituality, peace, unity, and service to humanity. It was established in the year 1976 by Darshan Singh.

Sawan Kirpal Ruhani Mission provides a forum for people to learn Meditation, experience personal transformation and bring about inner and outer peace and human unity.

SKRM has over 3200 centers and its literature is available in more than 55 languages. The headquarters of the organization is in Vijay Nagar, Delhi.

== Activities ==
Sawan Kirpal Ruhani Mission organizes and facilitates seminars and conferences aimed at promoting Human Unity & Peace among all mankind. Many international conferences organized annually by the mission, provide a common platform to religious, social, and spiritual leaders to discuss important and relevant issues in a mutually respectful and congenial environment. Goal of the Human Unity Conferences is to foster universal harmony and regard for all human beings no matter their social, ethnic, or cultural backgrounds.

Regular spiritual discourses and meditation workshops are held at all centres of the Mission. It also facilitates programs that provide a setting where people from around the world can learn to meditate.

== About the Head ==
The Spiritual Head of Sawan Kirpal Ruhani Mission, Rajinder Singh, is internationally recognized for his work toward promoting inner and outer peace through spirituality and meditation on the inner Light and Sound.

Rajinder Singh earned his bachelor's and master's degrees in electrical engineering from IIT (Indian Institute of Technology) Madras, India, and IIT (Illinois Institute of Technology) in Chicago, Illinois, respectively. He had a 20-year career in science, computers, and communications. He received his spiritual education from two of India's leading spiritual Masters: Kirpal Singh (1894–1974) and Darshan Singh (1921–1989). His training in both disciplines has helped him express age-old spiritual teachings in clear, logical language.

== Publications ==
Sawan Kirpal Ruhani Mission publishes and distributes books, as well as audio and video CDs and DVDs on spiritual topics in around 53 languages. Some of the latest bestseller books written by Rajinder Singh are Inner and Outer Peace through Meditation, Building Bridges through Meditation, Empowering Your Soul through Meditation, and Meditation as Medication for the Soul.
