= Darshan Academy =

Coordinates: 20.5937°N 78.9629°E

- India; Colombia

Information
- School type: Private
- Motto: Creating Generations of Peacemakers
- Founder: Sant Rajinder Singh Ji Maharaj
- School board: CBSE
- Gender: Co-educational
- Language: English
- Website: www.darshanacademy.org

Darshan Academy is a CBSE Affiliated, English medium, co-educational private high school. The school is situated in 22 cities of India and Columbia.

== Overview ==
Darshan Academy was founded by Sant Rajinder Singh Ji Maharaj. The school teaches students from classes pre-kindergarten to 12th grade. Darshan Academy offers senior secondary education in the fields of science (medical and non-medical), commerce, and humanities.

The school motto is "creating generations of peacemakers."

== Magazine ==
The annual school magazine is Darshanika. It contains articles on various school events of the past year, literary works from students of all standards and achievements, as well as accolades received by students and school staff in the past year. The magazine consists of text, primarily in English, Spanish, Hindi, Sanskrit, and other regional languages.

== Awards and honors ==
- Education Today ranked "Darshan Academy Meerut," as No.1 under category "Top Schools - City Wise".
