= Rajinder Singh (spiritual master) =

Indian spiritual leader

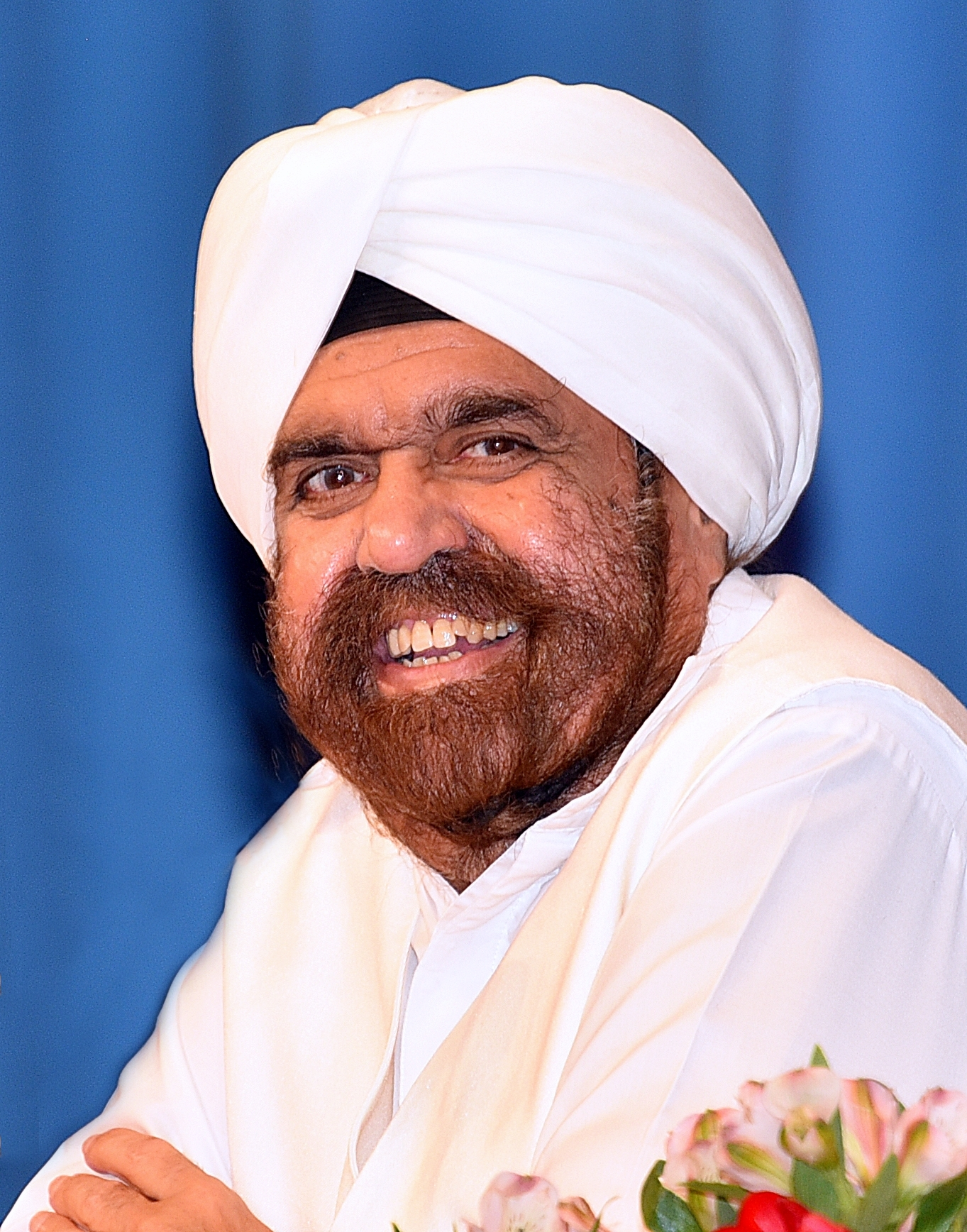
- Title: Sant

Personal life
- Born: 20 September 1946 (age 80) Delhi, India
- Spouse: Rita
- Parent(s): Darshan Singh, Harbhajan Kaur

Religious life
- Religion: Sikhism
- Institute: Science of Spirituality/Sawan Kirpal Ruhani Mission
- Lineage: Sant Mat (Non-Denominational)

Religious career
- Based in: Chicago, USA and Delhi, India
- Present post: Spiritual Master
- Predecessor: Darshan Singh
- Previous post: Engineer

Rajinder Singh (born 20 September 1946) is the head of the international, non-profit organization Science of Spirituality (SOS), also known in India as the Sawan Kirpal Ruhani Mission. To his disciples he is known as Sant Rajinder Singh Ji Maharaj. Singh is known for his work toward promoting inner and outer peace through spirituality and meditation on the inner Light and Sound.

== Biography ==
=== Life and career ===
Singh earned his bachelor's degree in India and his master's degree in Electrical Engineering from IIT (Illinois Institute of Technology) in Chicago, Illinois. He received his spiritual education from the Indian gurus Kirpal Singh (1894–1974) and Darshan Singh (1921–1989).

He is the son of Darshan Singh (1921–1989) and grandson of Kirpal Singh (1894–1974).

Singh has stated that, "One of the greatest benefits of meditation is that we will not only have peace in our own homes, but will contribute to the peace of the world. Throughout the world, people are praying for peace. But, as the expression goes, charity begins at home. World peace can only become a reality when each of us individually has peace in our own circles. If we bring peace into our individual spheres, the effect will be cumulative, and it will contribute to world peace. In 2000, He was part of a delegation of hundreds of world religious leaders who traveled to New York for the Millennium World Peace Summit of Religious and Spiritual Leaders, "an event unusual for its religious diversity and for its having convened at the United Nations," according to the New York Times. Singh told the Times, "When we sit and talk with them [leaders of other religions], we realize they are not much different".

Rajinder has written a number of books including Inner and Outer Peace Through Meditation which was #1 Barnes and Noble best-selling meditation book.

As founder of the Darshan Education Foundation, Singh has established Darshan Academy throughout India (schools that teach students from Pre-K—12). Integrating both meditation and a spiritual curriculum into a traditional academic environment, the foundation's goal is two-fold: first, to produce students whose spiritual potential is developed along with their intellect and physical well-being; and second, to inspire in each student a global view of the world, unobstructed by distinctions of race, nationality, religion, or economic status.

He was President of the 16th International World Human Unity Conference in 1998.

=== Philosophy ===
Singh emphasizes the fundamental unity and harmony of all faiths. He says his aim is to "take the mystery out of mysticism, to help people put mysticism into action in their own lives. By doing so, they will help themselves as well as those around them attain bliss and universal love." He emphasizes meditation as the basis for peace.

=== Science and spirituality ===
The method of meditation taught by him is called a science because it can be practiced by people of all cultures. In this method, aspirants perform the experiment of meditation within their own selves. By doing so, the practitioner can have an inner experience of spiritual light and sound, affirming that there is something that lies beyond this physical world.

== Awards and honors ==
=== Awards ===
- "Peace Award" by the Temple of Understanding and the Interfaith Center of New York, June 1997.
- Award by the City Council of San Ramon, California, 2010.
- "The Medal of Cultural Merit" from the National Minister of Education, Bogotá, Colombia.
- Illinois Institute of Technology Distinguished Leadership Award, Chicago, Illinois
- Award from the President of the State of Mexico, November 2008
- Simón Bolívar Award (Condecoracion Oficial Simon Bolivar) presented by the Minister of Education of Colombia at the Ministry of Education, in Bogotá
- "Distinguished Leadership Award" for his work in peace and spirituality by IIT (Illinois Institute of Technology) in Chicago, Illinois (November 1998).
- The Extraordinary Grand Cross award was granted by the Governor of the Department of Quindío, Carlos Eduardo Osorio Buritica in Colombia on 31 December 2019.

=== Honorary doctorates ===
Singh has received five honorary doctorates from various universities around the world in recognition of his work to introduce spirituality into science and education, and for his work toward human integration.

== Speeches and activities ==
=== Keynote addresses ===
Singh has been invited to deliver keynotes and talks at various conferences through the years.

At the United Nations Headquarters, New York (May 2016), in his keynote address, he explained how meditation on the inner Light and Sound can lead to inner peace, which paves the way to building bridges of unity, love, and outer peace in the world. At the Millennium World Peace Summit of Religious and Spiritual Leaders, United Nations, New York City, New York (August 2000), in his address entitled "Nature of Forgiveness and Compassion" Singh stated: "Spirituality is the recognition that behind our outer names and labels, we are souls, a part of one Creator. . . . When we develop this vision we no longer see through the eyes of prejudice and discrimination.". He also shared a speech at the UN celebration for Secretary General Kofi Annan.

At the United States Coast Guard Academy (USCGA), New London, Connecticut (November 1999), addressing the members of the academy in his talk "Moral Leadership for the 21st Century," Singh provided a blueprint for successful leadership.

At the Sixth Assembly of the World Conference on Religion and Peace, in Riva del Garde, Italy (November 1994), in this talk "Curing the World’s Pain," he stated: "To heal the world, we must heal ourselves. To bring peace to the world, we must have peace ourselves. We can attain this through meditation."

Symposium of the World Conference on Religion and Peace in Vienna, Austria (1998). In his address, “Building Peace in the World,” he explored the importance of meditation as the way to connect to our soul and to the divinity that exists within us. He said: “When we recognize that all people of the world are made of the same Light that we are made of, we will feel the pain of others. . . . Our outlook will be a global one, and we will make choices that will benefit our global brothers and sisters.”

=== Addresses to academic and medical institutions ===
- Harvard University, Cambridge, Massachusetts on Inner and Outer Communication (November 1996).
- National Institute of Health (NIH), Washington, D.C (July 1993)

=== Veggie Fest ===
He promoted the Veggie Fest, the vegetarian food and lifestyle festival in North America. Co-sponsored by the Science of Spirituality and over 30 vendors, the festival celebrates the benefits and joys of a vegetarian lifestyle. It is held in Lisle/Naperville, Illinois. In 2016, Veggie Fest celebrated its 11th year, launching its largest festival to date: Over 800 volunteers from around the world welcomed tens of thousands of visitors during its two-day program. Each year, participants attend this festival which includes: an international food court; vendor tents and food demos from noted area chefs; live music, a blood donation drive; a “Take the Vegetarian Challenge” tent, and a “Take the Meditation Challenge” tent.

Visitors can also attend the “Spirituality & Health Symposium” where doctors and health practitioners speak throughout the day on different aspects of the vegetarian diet and its impact on one's physical, mental, emotional, and spiritual well-being. Singh delivers the Keynote on both days.

== Publications ==
- 2022 Detox the Mind ISBN 0918224314
- 2016 Building Bridges through Meditation
- 2012 Meditation as Medication for the Soul ISBN 0918224721
- 2011 Spark of the Divine ISBN 978-0-918224-70-5
- 1999 Empowering Your Soul Through Meditation ISBN 0-00-716149-2
- 1996 Inner and Outer Peace Through Meditation ISBN 1-85230-949-0

Various children's books were also published.
