= Science of Spirituality =

Sant Mat Radha Soami derived organization

- Type: Spiritual, Non-Profit Organization
- Headquarters: Delhi, India and Lisle/Naperville, Illinois, United States
- Leader: Rajinder Singh
- Website: www.sos.org

Science of Spirituality is a 501(c)(3) non‑profit organization founded in 1979. The spiritual head of Science of Spirituality is Rajinder Singh. He teaches meditation on the inner Light and Sound so people can experience for themselves the spiritual riches within. The international headquarters for Science of Spirituality (SOS), also known as Sawan Kirpal Ruhani Mission (SKRM), are based in Delhi, India, and the Western Headquarters in Lisle/Naperville, Illinois, in the United States.

== Overview ==
Science of Spirituality has over 2,800 meditation centers in around 54 countries including Europe, Asia, Africa, Australia, Oceania, and North, South, and Central America.

The new Science of Spirituality International Meditation Center, located in Lisle, Illinois was inaugurated in July 2018. The event was attended by thousands of visitors from over thirty countries. Situated on 9 acres of land, the building, in both form and function, embodies the message of peace, community and universality. The official ribbon cutting ceremony took place in front of the “Meditator” statue on the reflecting pool at the front entrance to the Center. Helping Rajinder Singh cut the gold ribbon, were representatives from the US Congress as well as mayors from the Village of Lisle and the City of Wheaton. Also present among the 60-member delegation of dignitaries, were representatives from Gensler and Skender, the architectural firm and contractors respectively, that helped bring the vision of the Center to life.

Science of Spirituality focuses on global peace and human unity through meditation.

== Organization ==
The organization is dedicated to spirituality, peace, and service to humanity. Science of Spirituality (SOS) organizes and facilitates seminars, talks, classes, and programs and provides a setting where people from around the world can learn to meditate.

== Balancing meditation with outer responsibilities in the world ==
Science of Spirituality helps people learn how to balance meditating and developing spiritually with fulfilling duties and responsibilities towards society, work, and family.

== Ethical living and vegetarianism ==
According to Science of Spirituality, "Ethical living is the stepping stone to Spirituality" as Ethical living is an indispensable foundation for spiritual progress. It includes nonviolence, truthfulness, compassion, selfless service, observance of a vegetarian diet and avoidance of alcohol and recreational drugs. By transformation of one's self, one can be a positive influence on others and make a difference in the world.

Veggie Fest, a vegetarian food and lifestyle festival organized by Science of Spirituality focuses on spreading the idea of vegetarianism and how it can make a difference in the quality of life.

== Spiritual teachings ==
According to Science of Spirituality, the teachings consist of two parts: theory and practice. The theoretical side describes the process for self-knowledge and God-realization. The practical side provides a technique by which aspirants can practice the method of meditation and experience for themselves the spiritual teachings. At the core of these teachings, is the belief that: a) there is God; b) we are soul, a part of God; c) the highest goal of life is to know God; d) we can experience God by going within through meditation; and e) we gain spiritually by leading an ethical life and serving others selflessly.

== Selfless service projects ==
Science of Spirituality also participates in humanitarian efforts globally. The mission has raised and provided humanitarian aid for victims of natural disasters worldwide by collecting and distributing medicine and clothing and building new schools and villages in affected areas.

The mission also participates in blood donation drives, free eye-operation camps, as well as free allopathic, homeopathic, and ayurvedic medical services for everyone.
