= Saint Evilasius =

4th-century murderer-turned-saint in modern-day Turkey

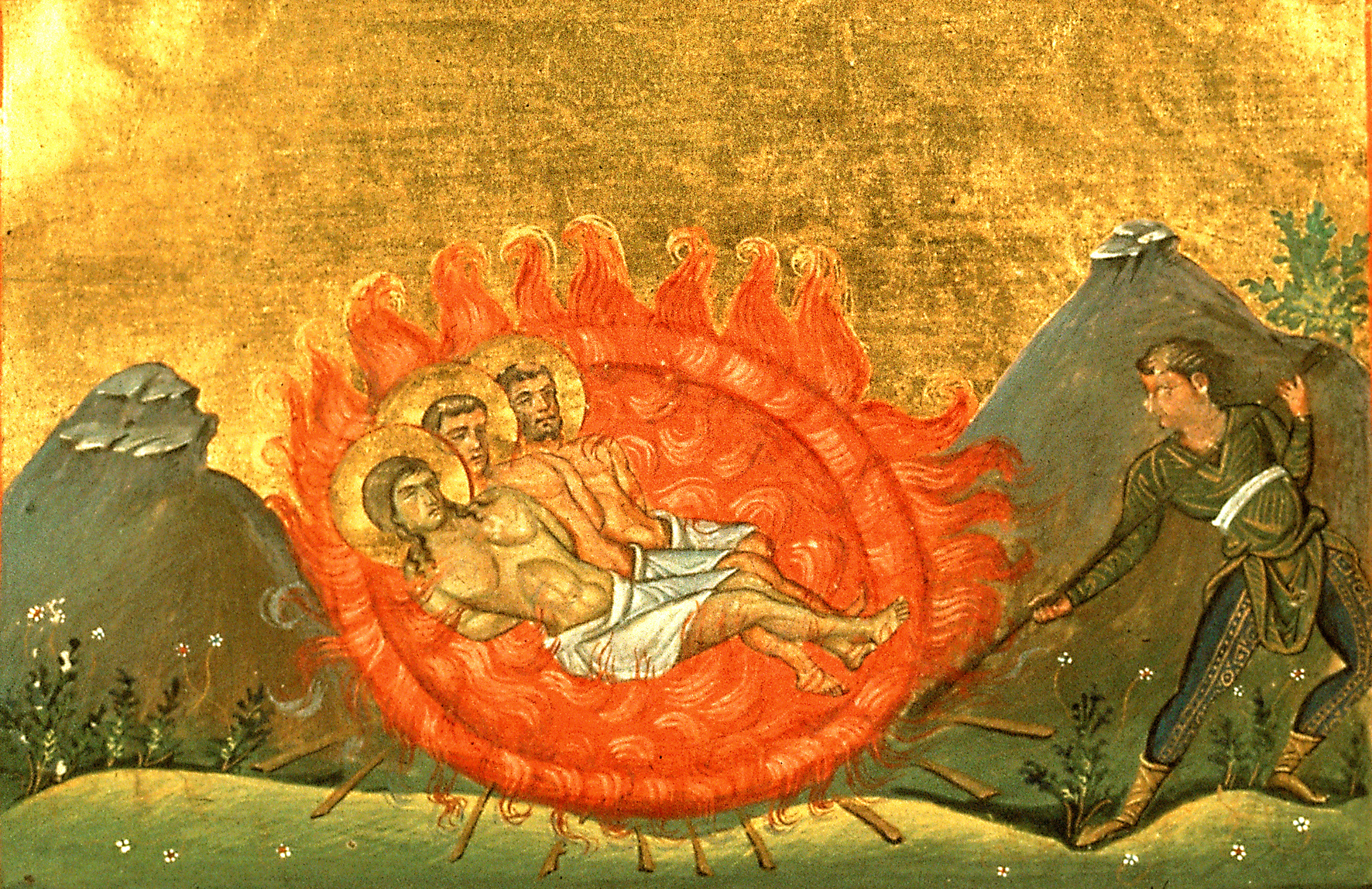
- Evilasius with Fausta and Maximus, at Cyzicus, from the Menologion of Basil II (c. 1000 AD)

Martyr
- Born: unknown
- Died: ~311 AD (80 years old); Cyzicus (modern-day Erdek, Balıkesir, Turkey)
- Venerated in: Catholic Church; Eastern Orthodox Church
- Feast: September 20 (Latin Catholic); February 6 (Eastern Orthodox)

Evilasius, also given as Euilasios, (died 311) was a pagan priest who took part in the Diocletianic Persecution and tortured a 13-year-old girl who later became known as Saint Fausta. He was later canonized as a saint.

== Hagiography ==
Prior to his experience with Fausta, Evilasius was a pagan priest and courtier who served under Diocletian. When Maximian heard of Fausta's faith, he commanded that Evilasius to force her to give tribute to the Roman gods or kill her.

Evilasius tortured Fausta, including having her head shaved and scraped of skin. He also attempted to saw her in two, but due to a miracle, she survived repeatedly. Eventually, Evilasius became worn down by this. It's said that he saw the Holy Spirit and was converted to Christianity.

Following this, Maximian sent a prefect, Maximinos, also known as Maximus, after Evilisius to confront him about his conversion. When Evilisius told the prefect that he would also be converted soon, Evilisius was also tortured. Eventually, they were both sentenced to be boiled alive in a cooking pot. However, due to a miracle, the fire died. Following this, Maximinos converted to Christianity and joined them in the cooking pot. Then, according to sacred tradition, all three of them were recalled to heaven. Other accounts state explicitly that they died.

== Veneration ==
Evilasius is venerated as a Catholic saint, alongside Fausta. Their feast day is 20 September. They're both venerated in the Eastern Catholic Churches, along with Maximus, where their feast day is 6 February.
