= Darshana Sandakalum =

Sri Lankan cricketer (born 1986)

Darshana Sandakalum (full name Gardhi Hettiarachchige Darshana Sandakalum Hettiarachchi; born 1 August 1986) is a Sri Lankan cricketer. He is a right-handed batsman who plays for Badureliya Sports Club. He was born in Colombo.

Sandakalum, who played at Under-23 level for Chilaw Marians Cricket Club between 2008 and 2009, made his List A debut for Badureliya in the 2009–10 season, against Nondescripts. He is an upper-order batsman.
