= Fausta of Cyzicus =

4th-century Christian martyr and saint

Saint Fausta
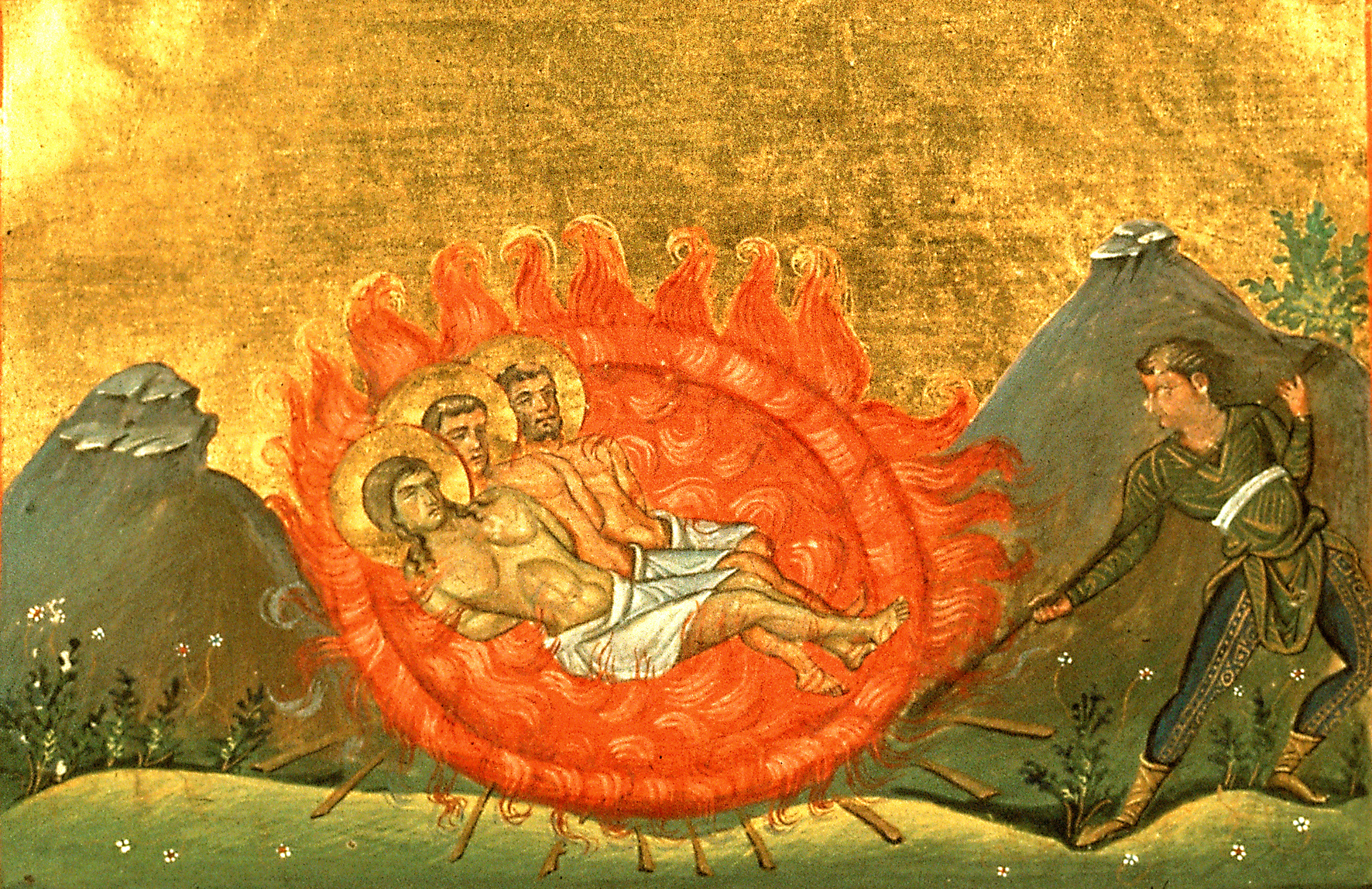
- Fausta with Evilasius and Maximus, at Cyzicus, from the Menologion of Basil II (c. 1000 AD)

Martyr
- Born: c. 298 AD
- Died: c. c. 311 AD (age 13); Cyzicus (modern-day Erdek, Balıkesir, Turkey)
- Venerated in: Catholic Church; Eastern Orthodox Church
- Feast: September 20 (Latin Church); February 6 (Eastern Orthodox)

Fausta of Cyzicus (Greek: Φαύστα Κύζικου), also known as Saint Fausta (c. 298 – 311), was a 4th-century girl from Cyzicus martyred in the Diocletianic Persecution. At the age of 13, she was arrested, tortured, and executed for being a Christian, the course of which led to her beatification.

== Hagiography ==
Fausta was born in 298AD. She was raised Christian by her parents, but she was orphaned at some point. Diocletian, hearing about her piety, ordered Evilasius to force Fausta to make a sacrifice to the Roman gods, or, if she refused, kill her.

Fausta was tortured, which included having her head shaved and scraped of skin. He also attempted to saw her in two, but due to a miracle, she survived repeatedly. Eventually, Evilasius became worn down by this. It's said that he saw the Holy Spirit and was converted to Christianity. Following this, Evilasius was also tortured for his faith.

Maximian had Fausta tortured even more, including having nails hammered into her feet. She was sentenced to Damnatio ad bestias, but reportedly, the animals did nothing. Following this, her body and head were pierced with nails.

Since nothing else had worked to this point, Maximian decided to have Fausta and Evilasius boiled in a cooking pot. However, due to a miracle, the fire died. Following this, the torturers were also converted to Christianity. One of the torturers, Maximinos, also known as Maximus, joined them in the cooking pot to be martyred alongside them. Then, according to sacred tradition, all three of them were recalled to heaven. Other stories state more explicitly that Fausta and Evilasius died.

== Veneration ==
Fausta is venerated as a Catholic saint, alongside Evilasius. Their feast day is 20 September. They are both venerated in the Eastern Catholic Church, along with Maximus, where their feast day is 6 February.
