= Karhan, Uttar Pradesh =

Village in Mau district, Uttar Pradesh

Karhan is a small town in Mau district, Uttar Pradesh, India.

== Description ==
In Karha village, children aged 0–6 make up approximately 16.73% of the total population, with 628 children in this age group. The village has an average sex ratio of 999, which is above the Uttar Pradesh state average of 912. However, the child sex ratio in Karha is 858, which is lower than the state average of 902. (According to 2011 Indian census)
