= Darshan Singh (spiritual master) =

Indian spiritual advisor (1921–1989)

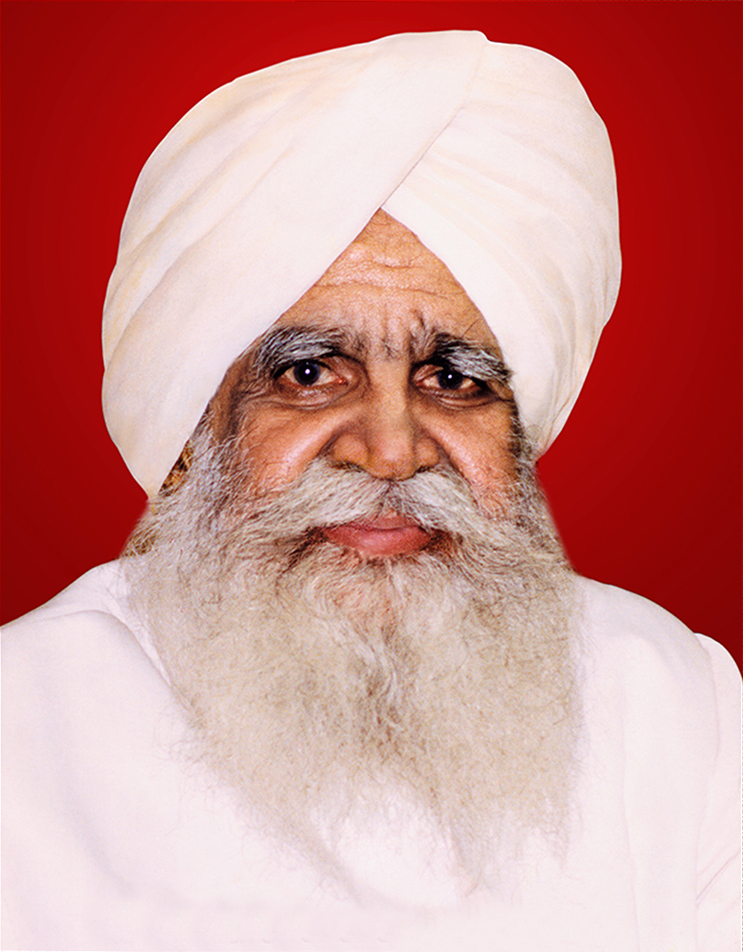
- Title: Sant

Personal life
- Born: 14 September 1921 British India
- Died: 30 May 1989 (aged 67) Delhi
- Spouse: Harbhajan Kaur
- Children: Rajinder Singh
- Parent: Kirpal Singh

Religious life
- Religion: Sant Mat (non-denominational)
- Institute: Science of Spirituality/Sawan Kirpal Ruhani Mission
- Lineage: Sawan Kirpal Ruhani Mission

Senior posting
- Predecessor: Kirpal Singh
- Successor: Rajinder Singh

Darshan Singh (1921–1989), also known as Sant Darshan Singh Ji Maharaj, was a well known Spiritual master in Radhasoami Sant Mat spiritual tradition, the founder and head of Sawan Kirpal Ruhani Mission / Science of Spirituality from 1974 until his death in 1989. The spiritual successor of Kirpal Singh, Singh was also widely recognized as one of India's leading poet-saints, writing in the Urdu language. Upon his sudden death on 30 May 1989, he was succeeded by Rajinder Singh.

== Biography ==
Born in India on September 14, 1921, Singh was the son of Kirpal Singh. In 1926, at age of 5, Darshan Singh was initiated by and received instructions on the meditation on the inner Light and Sound of God from Baba Sawan Singh Ji Maharaj (successor of Baba Jaimal Singh of Radha Soami Satsang Beas). For the next 22 years, Singh selflessly served the mission of Hazur, and continued to do so throughout the spiritual ministry of Kirpal Singh from 1948 to 1974.

He was educated at the Government College, Punjab University (Lahore). He went on to have a 37-year career in government services, retiring in 1979 as Deputy Secretary of the Finance Ministry. In 1943, he married Harbhajan Kaur.

Darshan Singh was a Spiritual Master who taught meditation on the inner Light and Sound, and was the founder of Sawan Kirpal Ruhani Mission / Science of Spirituality, a spiritual organization with international headquarters in Delhi, India and Chicago, Illinois (USA).

During his 15-year spiritual ministry, he founded Kirpal Ashram in Delhi, and established over 550 meditation centers in forty countries. He presided over the Sixth Conference of the World Fellowship of Religions (1981), the Asian Conference of Religions and Peace (1981), and the Fifteenth International Human Unity Conference, held in Delhi, India., in 1988. On July 27, 1980, he instituted “Master’s Day” to be celebrated on the fourth Sunday of July each year, in which people of all backgrounds can sit together to honor the saints and spiritual Masters of their traditions. In addition, he was acclaimed as one of India's greatest poet-saints. His collections of poems, won him four Academy Awards for poetry.

His Urdu Pharsi poems are published in five collections viz. Talash-e-Noor, Manzil-e-Noor, Mata-e-Noor, Jada-e-Noor and Mauj-e-Noor. He was awarded by Urdu Academy, Delhi and Urdu Academy, Uttar Pradesh for his books Manzil-e-Noor (1972) and Mata-e-Noor (1989).

Some of his English publications include Portrait of Perfection: A Pictorial Biography of Sant Kirpal Singh (1981), Spiritual Awakening (1983), A Tear and a Star (1986), and The Wonders of Inner Space (1988). He also published hundreds of articles and poems on spiritual topics in various periodicals. His writings have been translated into fifty languages.

During Darshan Singh's four world tours, he was presented with the keys to many cities and was honored by the Colombian parliament with its Medal of Congress and by the Congress of the United States with citations of merit. In 1986, Darshan Singh was invited to the United Nations on the invitation of Dr. Robert Muller, former Assistant Secretary General of the United Nations, to expound on the subject of inner and outer peace. During his visit, Darshan Singh held a prayer for world peace in the Security Council of the United Nations.

Darshan Singh died on May 30, 1989, a few days before leaving for a tour of conferences in the West for 3 months, already all reserved.

After the sudden death of Darshan, his biological son, Rajinder Singh (b. 1946), succeeded him.

In 1963, Kirpal Singh had declared that he knew of no one competent to be his successor. Then He stated most forcefully: "Whoever may come up in the future, I tell you most definitely that he will NOT be a member of my family!"
