= List of postage stamps of India =

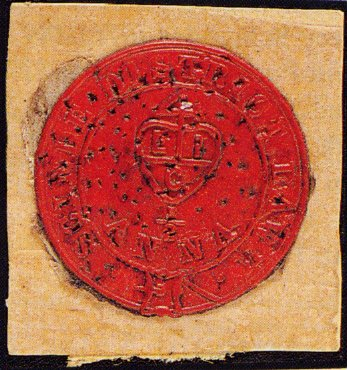
The Scinde Dawk of 1852, the first postage stamp of India is a round red sealing wafer.

India has a long and varied postal history and has produced a large number of postage stamps. These have been produced by a variety of techniques including line engraving, typography, lithography, photogravure and web-offset. Stamps have been produced both for postage and for service or revenue. Definitives and commemoratives have been issued. Stamps have been produced both as unperforated sheets, perforated and miniature sheets. The stamps have been produced in a number of shapes – the Scinde Dawk being rounded and some, like the stamp on the Bombay Sappers being triangular. Recently the 2009 stamp on Louis Braille had braille imprinting on it in addition. Many cases of overprinting exist – for converting the use of domestic postage stamps to service; to earmark stamps sold by field post offices attached with international control commissions and other reasons.

The Indian Postal Service has issued stamps on many themes – relating to history, architecture, nature, culture and heritage. Provisions exist for organisations and interested bodies to suggest the printing of special commemorative stamps as well as first day covers and cancellations. The Indian Post runs philatelic bureaus, operates deposit based philatelic services, a philatelic magazine and also publishes lists of stamps from time to time.

The article lists the stamps in two sections – Indian postage before and after independence. Stamps belonging to convention and feudatory states have been excluded.

== Stamps produced before independent India ==
The Mughal India utilized a communication system called “dawk” or “dak,” which employed horse runners for swift deliveries and foot runners for shorter distances. However, a more formal postal system in India began under the East India Company. In the 1720s, the Company established a postal service mainly for internal communication. Governor-General Robert Clive initiated a regular postal system in 1766, and in 1774, Warren Hastings founded the first General Post Office (GPO) in Calcutta. This was followed by the establishment of the Madras GPO in 1786 and the Bombay GPO in 1794.

The Post Office Act of 1837 granted the government the exclusive right to transport letters within the East India Company’s territories. In 1852, India became the first Asian country to issue its own postage stamps with the introduction of the “Scinde Dawk” in the Sindh district, a circular stamp created as part of postal reforms led by Sir Bartle Frere. Before this, postage was paid by the recipient, who could refuse delivery. The Scinde Dawk, valued at half an anna, featured the East India Company’s Merchant’s Mark with a heart-shaped motif divided into three sections, each containing the letters “EIC,” and the value inscribed below. The outer ring bore the inscription “Scinde district dawk.” Uniform postage rates were introduced nationwide in 1854. In 1854, British India issued its first nationwide postal stamps featuring the portrait of Queen Victoria.

Though British rule in India began effectively in the mid-nineteenth century i.e.1860s, the first adhesive stamp was issued in 1852, 12 years after the first Penny Black was issued in England. This was the Scinde Dawk. It was followed by the East India company lithographed issues and a long series of engraved stamps portraying Queen Victoria, King Edward VII, King George V, and King George VI.

== Stamps produced in independent India ==
India's independence saw the postal department issue its first stamp on 21 November 1947 depicting the Indian flag. The Dominion of India issued stamps from 1947 to 1949 with the caption of INDIA POSTAGE. In 1950, India became a republic and the first stamps of India as a republic were a series of four issued on that very day. The stamp issues continued to be in Annas (abbreviated as "As") until 1957, when the Indian rupee was decimalised: the rupee was divided into 100 naye paise (Hindi for "new paise"). In 1964, the initial "naye" was dropped. This change in currency is faithfully reflected in the denomination of the stamps of the time. The initial stamps were commemorative or special issues. In 1949 the first definitive "Archeological" series of 16 values was issued.

== Types of postal stamps ==
There are six types postal stamps are in circulation in India:

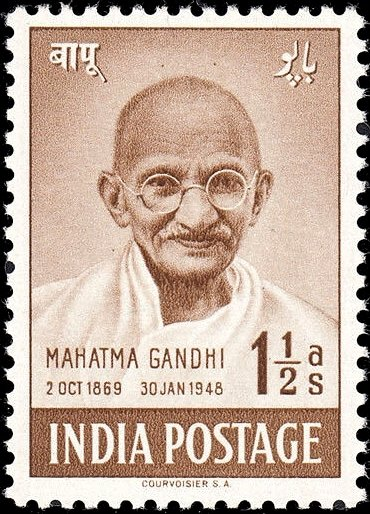
Commemorative stamp of Mahatma Gandhi

- Commemorative stamps: A commemorative stamp is often issued on a significant date such as an anniversary, to honour or commemorate a place, event, person, or object. The subject of the commemorative stamp is usually spelled out in print. There are numerous commemorative stamps that were issued by India to honour notable personalities like freedom fighters, politicians etc. Many other stamps to celebrate special events related to sports, space, science and technology, defence, arts and crafts etc. are issued.

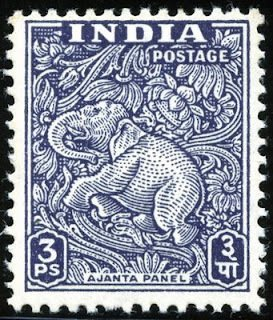
3 pice stamp of 1949 issue of definitive stamps

- Republic definitive stamps: These stamps are a part of the regular issue and are available for using postage services for an extended period of time. They are designed to serve the everyday postal needs of the country. A definitive issue or series have a range of denominations sufficient to cover ongoing postal rates. Several definitive stamps of India have been issued with different themes and illustrations, depicting art, history, science & technology, nature, vehicles, industries, institutions and more.

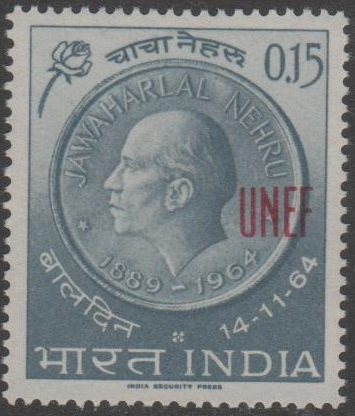
The 1965 India 15-paise Nehru Medal and Rose stamp overprinted “UNEF” for use as military stamp by Indian peacekeepers in Gaza during the Suez Crisis (1957-67)

- Military stamps : During the time of war or when peace keeping operations are on, special postage stamps have been issued called as military stamps. Mostly the army itself transports the letters to the desired destinations. These stamps were commonly used during World War II by soldiers who wanted to connect and send their message across to their beloveds. Prior to that and since that, many other military stamps of India have been released for various military operations where Indian Army has made some selfless contributions. These stamps portray different monuments, culture, arts and crafts, personalities and more. The stamps are overprinted to use in foreign on regular definitive stamps by Peace-keeping Armed Forces.
- Miniature sheets: A miniature sheet is a small group of stamps that are still attached to the sheet on which they are printed. They could be regular issues or commemorative ones as well. They could be individual designs as well with special illustrations on the sheet. Several miniature sheets have been issued by India which portrays different aspects of the nation's identity like famous personalities, important events, art and culture, history, monuments etc.

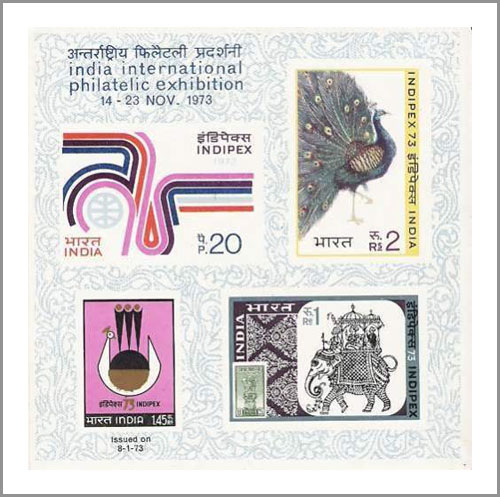
1973 Miniature sheet (International Philatelic Exhibition)

- Se-tenant stamps: Se-tenant stamps are printed on the same plate and adjoin one another. Though they make a set which adjoin each other on the same sheet, their designs, colour, denominations or overprint differ. They may also feature overlapped or extended designs which appear on the entire set of stamps. India has a tradition of releasing some extremely beautiful se-tenant stamps that collectors all over the world love to own.

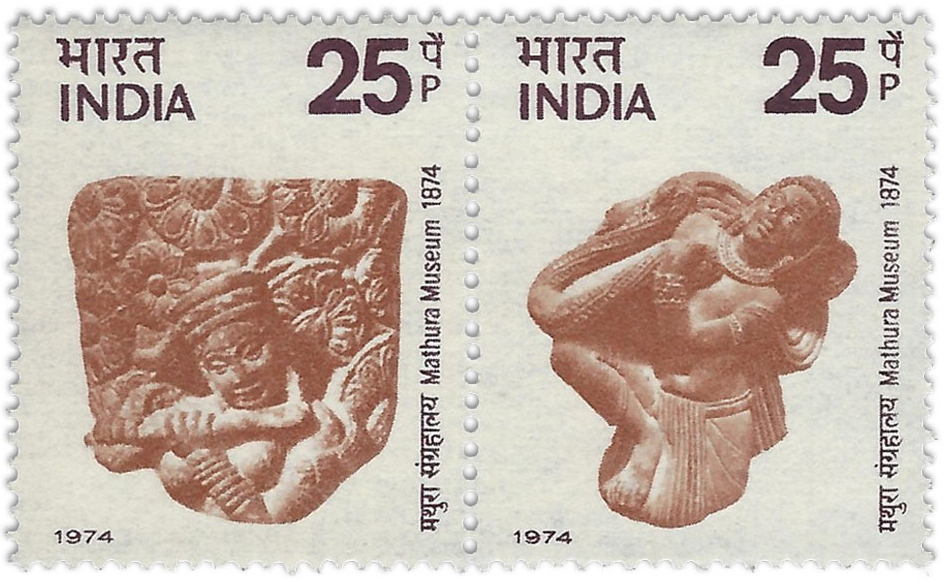
Se-tenant stamps (Mathura Museum) issued on 9 Oct. 1974 in a pair

- My Stamp: 'My Stamp' is the brand name for personalized sheets of postage stamps of India Post. The personalization is achieved by printing a thumb nail image of the individual photograph and logos of institutions, or images of artwork, heritage buildings, famous tourist places, historical cities, wildlife, other animals and birds etc., on a selected template sheet having postage stamps. 'My Stamp' was first introduced in India during the World Philatelic Exhibition, ‘INDIPEX-2011’. This scheme is available in selected Philatelic Bureaux and counters/ Important Post offices/Post Offices situated at tourist places.

== List of commemorative stamps by years ==
- List of postage stamps of India (1947–1950)
- List of postage stamps of India (1951–1960)
- List of postage stamps of India (1961–1970)
- List of postage stamps of India (1971–1980)
- List of postage stamps of India (1981–1990)
- List of postage stamps of India (1991–2000)
- List of postage stamps of India (2001–2005)
- List of postage stamps of India (2006–2010)
- List of postage stamps of India (2011–2015)
- List of postage stamps of India (2016–2020)
- List of postage stamps of India (2021–2025)
- List of postage stamps of India (2026–2030)

== See also ==
- List of Miniature Sheets from India Post
- Postage stamps and postal history of India

== Other sources ==
- Anon. (2008). Phila India 2008 Guide book (1800-2007).
- Anon. (1989). India Postage Stamps 1947-1988. Philately branch, Department of Posts, India.
- Anon. (2008). List of stamps (Year 1852 to 2007). Chief Postmaster General, Maharashtra Circle, Mumbai 400001.
- "Postage Stamps". Web portal. Department of Posts, Ministry of Communications & Information Technology, Government of India. 2015.
