= List of postage stamps of India (2001–2005) =

This is a list of postage stamps issued by the India Post between 2001 and 2005.

== 2001 ==
#	Issue date	Description	Image	Denomination	Unit
1	12 January	St. Aloysius College Chapel Paintings		1500	
2	25 January	Sane Guruji		300	
*		50 Years of Republic. Personality Series: Socio-Political Development, (Set of 3 Stamps)			
3	27 January	E. M. S. Namboodiripad		300	Set of 3
4	27 January	Giani Gurumukh Singh Musafir		300	Set of 3
5	27 January	N. G. Ranga		300	Set of 3
6	28 January	Sheel Bhadra Yajee		300	Single
*		India's Struggle for Freedom-Great Revolutionaries, (Set of 2 Stamps)			
7	29 January	Jubba Sahni		300	Set of 2
8	29 January	Yogendra Shukla - Baikunth Shukla		300	Set of 2
9	6 February	Western Railway Building, Churchgate, Mumbai		1500	Single
10	10 February	Census of India 2001		300	Single
*		International Fleet Review - 2001, (Set of 4 Stamps)			
11	18 February	IFR-2001 Logo (Painting of Boat of Mohenjodaro Period)		1500	Set of 4
12	18 February	Tarangini (Sail Training Ship)		300	Set of 4
13	18 February	Pal (Maratha Navy, 18th Century)		300	Set of 4
14	18 February	Galbat (Maratha Navy, 18th Century)		300	Set of 4
15	4 March	Geological Survey of India		300	Single
16	6 March	4th Maratha Light Infantry Bicentenary		300	Single
17	6 April	2600th Birth Anniversary of Bhagwan Mahavira		300	Single
18	12 April	40th Anniversary of Man's First Space Flight (Yuri Gagarin)		1500	Single
19	4 May	Fryderyk Chopin		1500	Single
20	31 May	Suraj Narain Singh		300	Single
21	1 June	B. P. Mandal		300	Single
22	11 June	Samanta Chandra Sekhar		300	Single
23	24 June	Sant Ravidas		300	Single
*		Personality Series : The Spirit of Nationalism, (Set of 4 Stamps)			
24	6 July	Syama Prasad Mookerjee		400	Set of 4
25	6 July	C. Sankaran Nair		400	Set of 4
26	6 July	U. Kiang Nongbah		400	Set of 4
27	6 July	Krishna Nath Sarma		400	Set of 4
28	21 July	Chandragupta Maurya		400	Single
29	22 July	Jhalkari Bai		400	Single
*		Corals of India, (Set of 4 Stamps)			
30	2 August	Fungia horrida		400	Set of 4
31	2 August	Acropora digitifera		400	Set of 4
32	2 August	Montipora aequituberculata		1500	Set of 4
33	2 August	Acropora Formosa		4500	Set of 4
34	5 August	Birth Centenary of Dwarka Prasad Mishra		400	Single
35	11 August	Chaudhary Brahm Prakash		400	Single
36	19 August	60th Anniversary of August Revolution, Ballia, Uttar Pradesh		400	Single
37	5 September	Jagdev Prasad		400	Single
38	19 September	Rani Avantibai		400	Single
39	23 September	Rao Tula Ram		400	Single
40	25 September	Chaudhary Devi Lal		400	Single
41	29 September	Satish Chandra Samanta		400	Single
42	1 October	Sivaji Ganesan		400	Single
43	2 October	Mahatma Gandhi : Man of the Millennium		400 (each)	Se-tenant
*		Personality Series : Poetry & Performing Arts, (Set of 3 Stamps)			
44	9 October	Bharathidasan		400	Set of 4
45	9 October	Lacchu Maharaj		400	Set of 4
46	9 October	Master Mitrasen		400	Set of 4
47	11 October	Birth Centenary of Jayaprakash Narayan		400	Single
*		Stories from Panchatantra, Indian Fables by Vishnusarman (Set of 8 Stamps)			
48	17 October	The Lion and The Rabbit (Se-tenant )		400 each	Set of 8
49	17 October	The Monkey and The Crocodile - Se-tenant		400 each	Set of 8
50	17 October	The Tortoise and The Geese - Se-tenant		400 each	Set of 8
51	17 October	The Crows and The Snake - Se-tenant		400 each	Set of 8
52	21 October	Global Iodine Deficiency Disorder Day		400	Single
53	26 October	Thangal Kunju Musaliar		400	Single
54	7 November	Cancer Awareness Day		400	Single
55	9 November	Bicentenary of Ranjit Singh's Coronation as Maharaja of Punjab		400	Single
56	14 November	National Children's Day		400	Single
57	17 November	Birth Centenary of Dr. V. Shantaram		400	Single
58	29 November	Birth Centenary of Sobha Singh		400	Single
*		Centenary of Conservation at Sun Temple - Konark, Orissa (Set of 2 Stamps)			
59	1 December	Sun Temple, Konark (Se-tenant )		1500, 400	Single
60	5 December	International Year of Volunteers		400	Single
61	14 December	Raj Kapoor		400	Single
62	18 December	100 Years of Digboi Refinery		400	Single
*		Greetings (Set of 2 Stamps)			
63	18 December	Flowers, Fireworks & Christmas Tree		300	Set of 2
64	18 December	Butterflies & Flowers		400	Set of 2
65	20 December	Vijaya Raje Scindia		400	Single
*		"Inpex-Empirepex 2001", National Stamp Exhibition, Nagpur. Temple Architecture (Set of 4 Stamps)			
66	22 December	Kedarnath		400	Set of 4
67	22 December	Tryambakeshwar		400	Set of 4
68	22 December	Aundha Nagnath		400	Set of 4
69	22 December	Rameshwaram		1500	Set of 4

== 2002 ==
#	Issue date	Description	Image	Denomination (paise)	Unit
1	7 January	100 Years of the Directorate General of Mines Safety		400	Single
2	15 January	Indian Army 2001 Everest Expedition		400	Single
3	21 January	Bauddha Mahotsava - Gridhakuta Hills, Rajgir		400	Set of 4
4	21 January	Dhamek Stupa, Sarnath		400	Set of 4
5	21 January	Mahaparinirvana Temple, Kushinagar		800	Set of 4
6	21 January	Mahabodhi Temple, Bodhgaya		1500	Set of 4
7	28 January	Years of Books		400	Single
8	4 February	Swami Ramanand		400	Single
9	18 March	Indian Ordnance Factories Bicentenary		400	Single
10	6 April	Sido Murmu - Kanho Murmu		400	Personality
11	16 April	150 Years-Indian Railways		1500	Event
12	26 April	50th Anniversary of Diplomatic Relations between India and Japan - Kabuki		1500	Se-tenant
13	26 April	50th Anniversary of Diplomatic Relations between India and Japan - Kathakali		1500	Se-tenant
14	13 May	Golden Jubilee - Parliament of India		400	Single
15	19 May	Prabodhankar Thackeray		400	Single
16	26 May	Cotton College, Guwahati		400	Single
17	16 June	P. L. Deshpande		400	Single
18	22 June	Brajlal Biyani		400	Single
19	22 June	Personality Set : Indian Literature - Pt. Suryanarayan Vyas		500	Set of 2
20	22 June	Personality Set : Indian Literature - Babu Gulabrai		500	Set of 2
21	23 July	Sree Thakur Satyananda		500	Single
22	1 August	Anna Bhau Sathe		400	Single
23	9 August	Anand Rishiji Maharaj		400	Single
24	10 August	Dr. Vithalrao Vikhe Patil		400	Single
25	10 August	Sant Tukaram		400	Single
26	12 August	Personality Set : Social Reformers - Chandraprava Saikiani		500	Set of 3
27	12 August	Personality Set : Social Reformers - Ayyankali		500	Set of 3
28	12 August	Personality Set : Social Reformers - Gora		500	Set of 3
29	16 August	Rose		200	Single
30	26 August	Bhaurao Krishnarao Gaikwad		400	Single
31	11 October	Ananda Nilayam Vimanam, Tirumala		1500	Single
32	12 October	Arya Vaidya Sala, Kottakkal		500	Single
33	12 October	Kanika Bandopadhyay		500	Single
34	15 October	Bhagwan Baba		500	Single
35	28 October	The Bihar Chamber of Commerce		400	Single
36	30 October	The Eighth Sessions of the Conference of the Parties of the United Nations Framework Convention on Climate Change (mangroves of India) - Rhizophora mucronata		500	Set of 4
37	30 October	The Eighth Sessions of the Conference of the Parties of the United Nations Framework Convention on Climate Change (mangroves of India) - Nypa fruticans		500	Set of 4
38	30 October	The Eighth Sessions of the Conference of the Parties of the United Nations Framework Convention on Climate Change (mangroves of India) - Bruguiera gymnorhiza		500	Set of 4
39	30 October	The Eighth Sessions of the Conference of the Parties of the United Nations Framework Convention on Climate Change (mangroves of India) - Sonneratia alba		1500	Set of 4
40	3 November	Swami Pranavananda		500	Single
41	11 November	Nagpur - Tercentenary		500	Single
42	14 November	Children's Day		500	Single
43	15 November	Handicrafts of India - cane and bamboo		500	Set of 4
44	15 November	Handicrafts of India - Thewa		500	Set of 4
45	15 November	Handicrafts of India - Patan's Patola		500	Set of 4
46	15 November	Handicrafts of India - Dhokra		500	Set of 4
47	1 December	Santidev Ghose		500	Single
48	17 December	Tamralipta Jatiya Sarkar - Ajoy Kumar Mukherjee		500	Se-tenant
49	17 December	Matangini Hazra		500	Se-tenant
50	23 December	Anglo-Bengali Inter College, Allahabad		500	Single
51	24 December	Gurukula Kangri Vishwavidyalaya, Hardwar		500	Single
52	28 December	Dhirubhai H. Ambani		500	Single
53	31 December	T. T. Krishnamachari		500	Single
54	31 December	Forts of Andhra Pradesh - Golconda Fort		500	Set of 2
55	31 December	Forts of Andhra Pradesh - Palace, Chandragiri Fort		500	Set of 2

== 2003 ==
#	Issue date	Description	Image	Denomination (paise)	Unit
1	5 February	AERO INDIA 2003 - HT-2		500	Set of 4
2	5 February	AERO INDIA 2003 - Marut		500	Set of 4
3	5 February	AERO INDIA 2003 - Light Combat Aircraft		500	Set of 4
4	5 February	AERO INDIA 2003 - Dhruv		1500	Set of 4
5	11 February	Ghantasala		500	Single
6	26 February	S. L. Kirloskar		500	Single
7	14 March	Kusumagraj		500	Single
8	23 March	Sant Eknath		500	Single
9	28 March	Frank Anthony		500	Single
10	30 March	Kakaji Maharaj		500	Single
11	7 April	Medicinal plants of India - guggulu		500	Set of 4
12	7 April	Medicinal plants of India - brahmi		500	Set of 4
13	7 April	Medicinal plants of India - ashwagandha		500	Set of 4
14	7 April	Medicinal plants of India - amla		500	Set of 4
15	2 May	Durga Das		500	Single
16	15 May	Golden voice of Yesteryears - Kishore Kumar		500	Set of 4
17	15 May	Golden voice of Yesteryears - Mukesh		500	Set of 4
18	15 May	Golden voice of Yesteryears - Mohammed Rafi		500	Set of 4
19	15 May	Golden voice of Yesteryears - Hemant Kumar		500	Set of 4
20	29 May	Golden Jubilee : Ascent of Mount Everest		1500	Single
21	30 May	Muktabai		500	Single
22	19 June	Government Museum, Chennai - Natesa		500	Set of 3
23	19 June	Government Museum, Chennai - Amaravati Sculpture		500	Set of 3
24	19 June	Government Museum, Chennai - Museum Theatre		1500	Set of 3
25	23 June	V. K. Rajwade		500	Single
26	30 June	Bade Ghulam Ali Khan		500	Single
27	3 September	Our World of Special Children		500	Single
28	15 September	Temple Architecture - Vishal Badri Temple, Badrinath		500	Set of 4
29	15 September	Temple Architecture - Mallikarjunaswamy Temple, Srisailam		500	Set of 4
30	15 September	Temple Architecture - Tripureswari Temple, Udaipur, Tripura		500	Set of 4
31	15 September	Temple Architecture - Jagannath Temple, Puri		500	Set of 4
32	24 September	Janardan Swami		500	Single
33	3 October	Waterfalls of India - Athirapally Falls		500	Set of 4
34	3 October	Waterfalls of India - Kempty Falls		500	Set of 4
35	3 October	Waterfalls of India - Kakolat Falls		500	Set of 4
36	3 October	Waterfalls of India - Jog Falls		1500	Set of 4
37	9 October	Jnanpith Award Winners: Malayalam - G. Sankara Kurup		500	Set of 3
38	9 October	Jnanpith Award Winners: Malayalam - S. K. Pottekkatt		500	Set of 3
39	9 October	Jnanpith Award Winners: Malayalam - Thakazhi Sivasankara Pillai		500	Set of 3
40	10 October	K. Shivarama Karanth		500	Single
41	14 October	Narendra Mohan		500	Single
42	21 October	Govind Rao Pansare		500	Single
43	30 October	Greetings		400	Set of 4
44	30 October	Greetings		400	Set of 4
45	30 October	Greetings		500	Set of 4
46	30 October	Greetings		500	Set of 4
47	1 November	150 years of Telecommunications in India		500	Single
48	7 November	Bengal Sappers Bicentanary		500	Single
49	9 November	100 years of Kalka-Shimla Railway		500	Single
50	12 November	Nature India-snakes : python		500	Set of 4
51	12 November	Nature India-snakes : bamboo pit viper		500	Set of 4
52	12 November	Nature India-snakes : king cobra		500	Set of 4
53	12 November	Nature India-snakes : gliding snake		500	Set of 4
54	14 November	Children's Day		500	Single
55	22 November	2 Guards (1 Grenadiers) - 225 Years		500	Single
56	27 November	Harivansh Rai Bachchan		500	Single
57	29 November	India-France-Joint Issue - Rooster Motif : 15th Century Sketch		2200	Set of 2
58	29 November	Peacock Motif : 19th Century Minakari		2200	Set of 2
59	3 December	Yashpal		500	Single
60	10 December	Diplomatic Relation between India and Korea - Jantar Mantar, Jaipur		1500	Set of 2
61	10 December	Gyeongju cheomgdae		1500	Set of 2
62	11 December	200th Session : Rajya Sabha		500	Single
63	18 December	Mukut Bihari Lal Bhargava		500	Single
64	20 December	Swami Swarupanandji		500	Single
65	22 December	Sangeet Natak Akademi		500	Set of 3
66	22 December	Sangeet Natak Akademi		500	Set of 3
67	22 December	Sangeet Natak Akademi		500	Set of 3
68	29 December	Personality Series - Folk Music - Lalan Fakir		500	Set of 2
69	29 December	Personality Series - Folk Music - Allah Jilai Bai		500	Set of 2
70	31 December	Major Somnath Sharma, PVC		500	Single
71	31 December	S. Nijalingappa		500	Single

== 2004 ==
#	Issue date	Description	Image	Denomination (paise)	Unit
1	14 January	C. D. Deshmukh		500	Single
2	16 January	Nani A. Palkhivala		500	Single
3	6 February	Dr. B. D. Garware		500	Single
4	18 March	Annamacharya		500	Single
5	1 April	9 Madras (Travancore)		500	Single
6	14 April	V. Lakshminarayana		500	Single
7	25 April	IISWBM, Kolkata		500	Single
8	25 April	INS Tarangini		500	Single
9	28 April	Baji Rao Peshwa		500	Single
10	15 May	Siddhar Swamigal		500	Single
11	27 May	Indra Chandra Shastri		500	Single
12	2 June	150 Years Woodstock School		500	Single
13	17 June	Jyoti Prasad Agarwalla		500	Single
14	19 June	P. N. Panicker		500	Single
15	28 June	The Great Trigonometrical Survey		500	Set of 3
16	28 June	The Great Trigonometrical Survey : Radhanath Sikdar		500	Set of 3
17	28 June	The Great Trigonometrical Survey : Nain Singh		500	Set of 3
18	30 June	Aacharya Bhikshu		500	Single
19	13 August	28th Olympics		500	Set of 4
20	13 August	28th Olympics		500	Set of 4
21	13 August	28th Olympics		1,500	Set of 4
22	13 August	28th Olympics		1,500	Set of 4
23	16 August	Indo-Iran Joint Issue - Kabir		1500	Se-tenant
24	16 August	Indo-Iran Joint Issue - Hafez		1500	Se-tenant
25	17 August	Murasoli Maran		500	Single
26	20 August	Rajiv Gandhi Renewable Energy Day		500	Single
27	26 August	S. S. Vasan		500	Single
28	30 August	Panini		500	Single
29	10 September	K. Subrahmanyam		500	Single
30	1 October	M. C. Chagla		500	Single
31	4 October	150 years of India Post		500 each	Set of 4
32	4 October	150 years of India Post		500 each	Set of 4
33	4 October	150 years of India Post		500 each	Set of 4
34	4 October	150 years of India Post		500 each	Set of 4
35	4 October	Tirupur Kumaran		500	Single
36	8 October	Ashok Chakra Winners : Neerja Bhanot		500	Se-tenant
37	8 October	Ashok Chakra Winners : Randhir Prasad Verma		500	Se-tenant
38	10 October	Guru Dutt		500	Single
39	24 October	Indian Soldiers of Peace - UN Peace Keeping Operations		500	Single
40	24 October	Maruthu Pandiyar Brothers		500	Single
41	25 October	Greetings - Kites		400	Set of 2
42	25 October	Greetings - Dolls		400	Set of 2
43	27 October	Dr. S. Roerich		500	Single
44	10 November	Dr. Tenneti Vishwanadham		500	Single
45	14 November	Children's Day		500	Single
46	23 November	Walchand Hirachand		500	Single
47	25 November	Dula Bhaya Kag		500	Single
48	28 November	Aga Khan Award for Architecture : Agra Fort		1500	
49	28 November	Aga Khan Award for Architecture : Agra Fort		1500	
50	10 December	Bhagat Puran Singh		500	Single
51	12 December	Nupi Lal		500	Single
52	14 December	Energy Conservation		500	Single
53	16 December	Taj Mahal		1500	Single
54	21 December	Sahitya Akademi		500	Single
55	27 December	Bhaskara Sethupathy		500	Single

== 2005 ==
#	Issue date	Description	Image	Denomination (paise)	Unit
1	9 January	India : Breeds of Dogs - Himalayan Sheep Dog		500	Set of 4
2	9 January	India : Breeds of Dogs - Rampur Hound		500	Set of 4
3	9 January	India : Breeds of Dog - Mudhol Hound		500	Set of 4
4	9 January	India : Breeds of Dogs - Rajapalayam		1500	Set of 4
5	3 February	Padampat Singhania		500	Single
6	23 February	Rotary International : A Century of Service		500	Single
7	27 February	Krishan Kant		500	Single
8	10 March	Madhavrao Scindia		500	Single
9	24 March	Flora and fauna of North East India - clouded leopard		500	Set of 4
10	24 March	Flora and fauna of North East India - Mishmi takin		500	Set of 4
11	24 March	Flora and fauna of North East India - Dillenia indica linn		500	Set of 4
12	24 March	Flora and fauna of North East India - pitcher plant		500	Set of 4
13	5 April	Dandi March		500 each	Set of 4
14	5 April	Dandi March		500 each	Set of 4
15	5 April	Dandi March		500 each	Set of 4
16	5 April	Dandi March		500 each	Set of 4
17	13 April	300 Years of 15 Punjab (Patiala)		500	Single
18	18 April	Bandung Conference		1500	Single
19	3 May	Narayan Meghaji Lokhande		500	Single
20	8 May	100 Years of Co-operative Movement in India		500	Single
21	5 June	World Environment Day : Green Cities		500	Single
22	1 July	Abdul Qaiyum Ansari		500	Single
23	31 July	Dheeran Chinnamalai		500	Single
24	31 August	State Bank of India		1500	Single
25	21 September	International Day of Peace		500	Single
26	1 October	Pratap Singh Kairon		500	Single
27	1 October	A. M. M. Murugappa Chettiar		500	Single
28	2 October	Dr. T. S. Soundram		500	Single
29	18 October	Letter Box		500 each	Set of 4
30	18 October	Letter Box		500 each	Set of 4
31	18 October	Letter Box		500 each	Set of 4
32	18 October	Letter Box		500 each	Set of 4
33	21 October	Kavimani Desigavinayagam Pillai		500	Single
34	21 October	Thiru. V. Kalyanasundaram		500	Single
35	21 October	Ayothidhasa Pandithar		500	Single
36	24 October	Prabodh Chandra		500	Single
37	14 November	Children's Day		500	Single
38	14 November	Children Film Society		500	Single
39	16 November	PHD Chamber of Commerce and Industry		500	Single
40	17 November	World Summit on the Information Society		500	Single
41	19 November	Kolkata Police Commissionerate : 150 Years		500	Single
42	24 December	Newborn Health in India		500	Single
43	2 November	Jawaharlal Darda		500	Single
44	4 December	Builder's Navy		500	Single
45	18 December	M. S. Subbulakshmi		500	Single
46	19 December	Integral Coach Factory		500	Single
47	21 December	Jadavpur University		500	Single
48	27 December	16 Squadron Air Force		500	Single
49	30 December	De Facto Transfer of Pondicherry		500	Single

== See also ==
- List of postage stamps of India
- List of Miniature Sheets from India Post
- Postage stamps and postal history of India
