= Smilers sheet =

Stamp Show 2000 smilers sheet with generic labels

Smilers is the name given to Britain's personalised stamps. Personalised stamp sheets (or P-Stamps) were first issued by Australia Post in the summer of 1999.

== History ==
Personalized stamp sheets were first issued by the Post Office (subsequently renamed Royal Mail) to coincide with The Stamp Show 2000, Britain's international stamp exhibition held in May 2000 at Earls Court.

The "Smilers" A4-sized stamp sheets contained ten se-tenant "smiles" stamps with a generic label design. Personalised versions of these stamp sheets were made available to the public at special photo-booths throughout the 2000 Stamp Show held in London. The cost for a single sheet of ten stamps and personalised photo labels was £5.95 (£10.00 for two sheets; equivalent to a premium of £4.80 on the cost of twenty stamps). The cost in March 2008 was £13.50 per single sheet of twenty first-class stamps or £12.50 for two or more sheets (a premium of £6.70 over face value).

This service proved popular to visitors attending the show, arguably due to its novelty value, but later attempts to continue the Smilers sheet format with other stamp designs was initially not so popular. This can be attributed to the novelty value having worn off and the premium charged above face value. As a result, the subsequent four or five Smilers sheet issues are now scarce. The 2000 Christmas sheets featured designs of a robin in the aperture of a pillar box and Father Christmas holding a Christmas cracker that had first appeared in 1995 and 1997. The 2001 sheets were even less popular when issued, as they featured those same designs again, the only difference being the addition of the word "Smilers" and the name Consignia in place of Post Office on the selvage.

As an alternative to the personalised version, using a photo or image provided by the purchaser, Royal Mail also produce sheets with pre-designed "generic" labels at a much lower premium.

In 2002 the Post Office registered the name Smilers as their branded name for their personalised stamp service. The name derives from its use on the first British personalised stamp sheet of a set of 10 stamps that first appeared in a Greetings Booklet issued in 1990. They were referred to as "Smiles" stamps because they featured famous smiles with which people could identify. The Greetings Booklet comprised a pane of 10 stamps and a separate sheet of labels with greetings such as "Hello", which could be affixed separately on the envelope alongside the stamp, in effect the forerunner of the se-tenant stamp sheets issued at The Stamp Show 2000.

== Stamp details ==
The stamp designs are taken from the 1990 Greetings booklet stamps.

- Issue date: 22 May 2000
- Stamp design: Greetings "Smiles"
- Quantity: 10 × 1st NVI
- Sheet design: The Post Office
- Printed by: House of Questa
- Printing method: photogravure
- Perforations: 15 × 14
