= Bal Krishna Sharma Naveen =

Indian journalist, politician and poet (1897-1960)

Bal Krishna Sharma
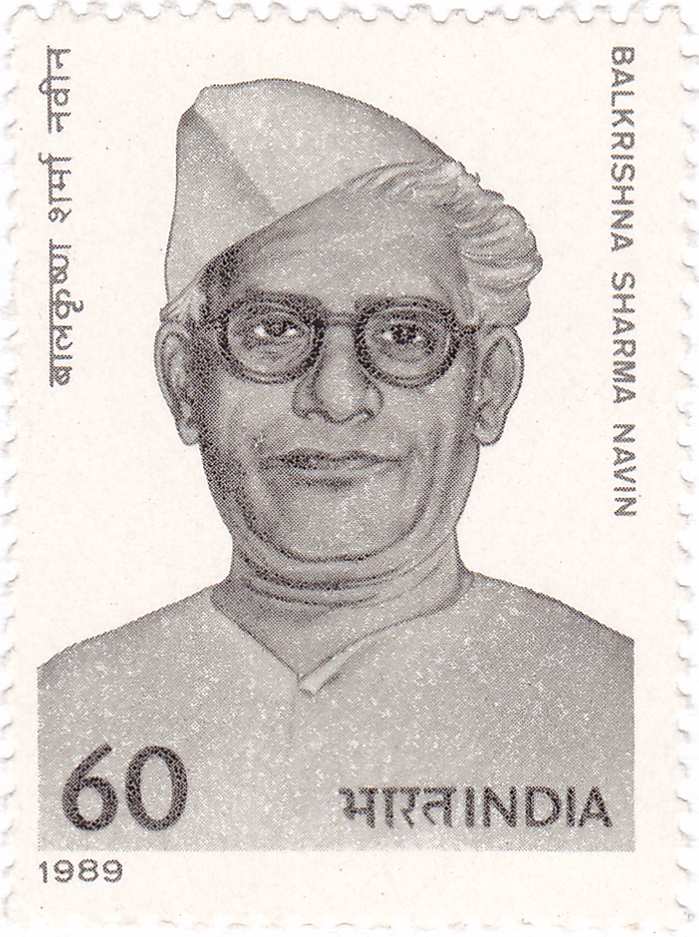
- Naveen on a 1989 stamp of India
- Born: 8 December 1897; Bhyana, Shajapur district, Madhya Pradesh, India
- Died: 29 April 1960 (aged 62)
- Occupations: Freedom activist Poet; Politician; Journalist
- Known for: Hindi poems
- Parent(s): Jamanadas Sharma; Radhabai
- Awards: Padma Bhushan

Bal Krishna Sharma (8 December 1897 – 29 April 1960), known under the pen name Naveen, was an Indian freedom activist, journalist, politician and a poet of Hindi literature. He was a member of the 1st Lok Sabha, representing Kanpur constituency and served the Rajya Sabha as a member from 1957 till his death. He succeeded Ganesh Shankar Vidyarthi as the editor of Pratap daily and also served as a member of the Official Languages Commission. His poetry anthologies include Kumkum, Rashmirekha, Apalak, Kwasi, Vinoba Stavan, Urmila and Hum Vishpaee Janam Ke, the last one published posthumously. The Government of India awarded him the third highest civilian honour of the Padma Bhushan, in 1960, for his contributions to literature. India Post issued a commemorative stamp on Sharma in 1989.

== Biography ==
Bal Krishna Sharma was born on 8 December 1897 at Bhyana, a small village in Shajapur district of the Indian state of Madhya Pradesh, in a family of modest financial means to Jamanadas Sharma and Radhabai. Due to poverty at home, he could start his formal education only at the age of 11 at a local school in Shajapur where he completed the middle school. Moving to Ujjain, he passed matriculation in 1917 and during this period, he had the opportunity to meet Makhanlal Chaturvedi, the renowned poet, who led him to Ganesh Shankar Vidyarthi, who would later precede him as the editor of Pratap magazine. The new personal connections helped him to shift his base to Kanpur and he joined Christ Church College, Kanpur to pursue his graduate studies (BA). A turning point in his life occurred during his Kanpur college days when he participated in the Non-cooperation movement and this prompted him to abandon his college studies in 1921 to take up politics as a full-time career.

Sharma became active in the Indian freedom movement and was incarcerated by the British government six times between 1921 and 1944, the government declaring him as a dangerous prisoner. He pursued his journalistic career concurrently through his association with Pratap, a Hindi language daily, and when Ganesh Shankar Vidyarthi, the then editor of the newspaper died in March 1931, he was chosen as the editor. After the Indian independence of 1947, he took up party politics, continuing his alignment with the Indian National Congress (INC). He contested the first lok sabha elections of 1951–52, and won from the Kanpur District South cum Etawah district Lok Sabha constituency, defeating Chandrasekhar of the Congress Socialist Party with a margin of over 26,500 votes, securing almost 50 percent of the votes polled. In 1957, he was elected to the Rajya Sabha, a post he held till his death. His active participation in political and social activities together with his oratorical skills earned him the moniker, Lion of Kanpur. When the Official Languages Commission was established by the Government of India in 1955, he was selected as a member and he was also a member of the Cultural delegation which visited a number of countries including Nepal, Mauritius and USA.

Sharma wrote several poems, under the pen name Naveen, since his college days which reflected patriotic fervor and published many anthologies such as Kumkum, Rashmirekha, Apalak, Kwasi, Vinoba Stavan and Urmila. He was the editor of the Hindi language literary magazine, Prabha. The Government of India awarded him the third highest civilian honour of the Padma Bhushan in 1960, a few months before his death on 29 April 1960; while he was serving as a member of the Rajya Sabha. Some of his poems were compiled by Gyanpeeth after his death and published under the title, Hum Vishpaee Janam Ke. His prose writings, Balkrishna Sharma Gadya Rachanavali is available in 5 volumes and poems, Balkrishna Sharma Kavya Rachanavali has been published in 3 volumes. His poems have been reported to have influenced many, including the former Indian Prime Minister, Atal Behari Vajpayee. The India Post honored him with a commemorative stamp in 1989 and the Uttar Pradesh Hindi Sansthan has instituted an award, Bal Krishna Sharma Naveen award, in his honor. A college in Shajapur managed by the Government of Madhya Pradesh, Government Balkrishna Sharma Navin Post Graduate College, has been named after him. His life has been documented in a biography, Balkrishna Sharma Naveen, written by Vishnu Tripathi and published in 2013.

== See also ==
- List of postage stamps of India
- Official Languages Commission
- Makhanlal Chaturvedi
- Ganesh Shankar Vidyarthi
