= The Stamp Show 2000 =

The "Matthews Palette" stamp miniature sheet produced for Stamp Show 2000.

The Stamp Show 2000 was an international stamp exhibition held 22–28 May 2000 at Earl's Court Exhibition Centre in London.

The show included the first personalized stamp sheets from the British Post Office, now generally known as Smilers sheets. Another innovation was the "Matthews Palette" miniature sheet which was produced specifically for the show. The sheet featured stamps in colours drawn from the palette that designer Jeffery Matthews had produced in 1984 for Royal Mail, in order to return British definitive stamps to Arnold Machin's original idea of a light tone for the Queen's head against a solid background.
