= Personalised stamp =

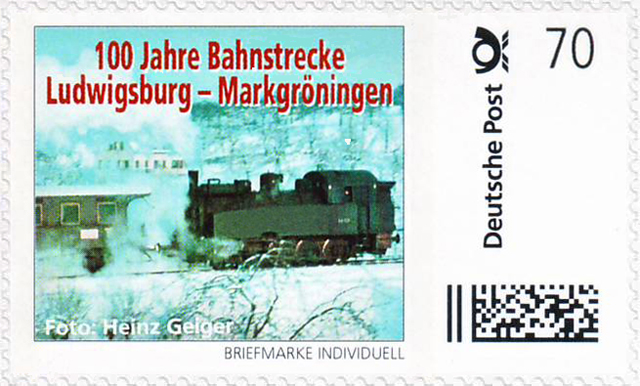
A German personalised stamp

A personalised (or personalized) stamp is a postage stamp on which, for a fee, an image and/or text of the purchaser's choosing may be placed. The stamps vary from country to country, and while some are normal stamps with a personalised label on the left attached by perforations, elsewhere the stamps are more properly regarded as one-piece personalised meter stamps with a colourful design next to the indicia. Stamps produced by Zazzle.com for the United States, for instance, are one-piece, self-adhesive with die cut margins to emulate perforations, and visually very similar to normal United States postage stamps, except for the addition of an information-based indicia (IBI) encoded by little black and white squares along one edge. A serial number appears next to the IBI.

== Usage ==
Examples given by postal authorities who offer this service usually depict family members, pets or other uncontroversial subjects but users quickly realised that they could place almost any image in its space. For instance, there have been attempts to publicise missing persons, promote political causes such as Tamil independence, or to place the image of criminals or other controversial individuals on its stamps. The rules of most countries generally prohibit such things, however, stamp producers may not spot every attempt to circumvent their rules, particularly when it is not obvious who or what is being depicted, or that the image has some political or other significance.

== By country ==
=== Austria ===
The Austrian Postal Service has permitted personalisation of postage stamps. In Austria the denomination of personalised stamps can now be changed as well.

=== Bhutan ===
Bhutan Post issued the first personalised stamps in 2008. The stamps are issued in mini-sheets of 12 stamps with a large illustration at the left highlighting a Bhutan issue. Each stamp is framed, providing a blank space in the middle for a personal picture or company logo. In 2019 the tenth different personalised stamp sheet has been issued.

=== India ===
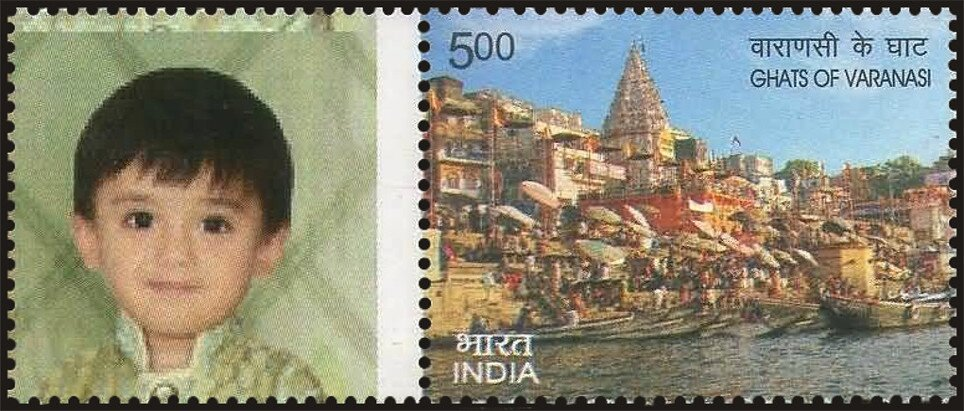
An example of My Stamp

My Stamp is the brand name for personalised stamps of India Post.

=== Indonesia ===
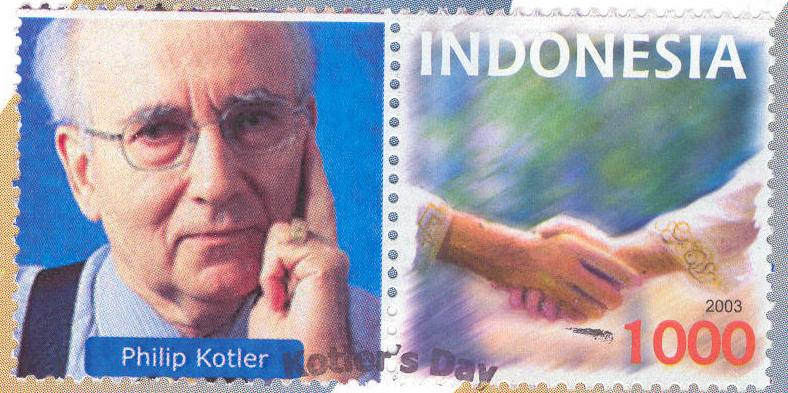
An example of Prisma stamp

Personalised stamps or Prisma (PRangko IdentitaS Milik Anda – "your identity stamp", but also Indonesian for a prism) were launched in Indonesia in 2003. The guidelines allow the stamps to show portraits of one or more people, writing or signatures, logos, symbols, and slogans, and advertisements of products and services.

=== Malta ===
MaltaPost introduced personalised stamps in 2005. These consist of personalised labels adjoining a stamp, and MaltaPost continues to offer this service as of 2020.

=== Netherlands ===
PostNL provides the possibility to make personalised stamps. A blank space in the middle of the stamp can be used for a personal picture, drawing, company logo, etc. The customer can choose from a number of different denominations (domestic rate, international rate or the special December rate).

=== United Kingdom ===
Royal Mail has permitted personalisation of labels adjoining their stamps. The stamps are produced in small sheets known as smilers sheets.

=== United States ===
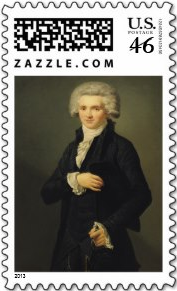
A personalised stamp provided by Zazzle.com

In the United States, personalised stamps – also known as customized postage – are technically a form of meter labels and are governed by the United States Postal Service. As "a form of meter labels", they are not supposed ("they are not required") to be cancelled for postal purposes. Instead, a scanning machine at the post office is supposed to scan and void the postal value of that personalised stamp. For philatelic purposes, the postmarking of a personalised stamp is permitted, and it is harmless to USPS. In fact, a visible postmark is a further protection of revenue for USPS, since a postmarked personalised stamp is far less likely to be re-affixed on a mail piece for another mailing. While consumers may find that customized postage is available in a number of retail and online outlets, the USPS has authorized different companies to handle selected aspects of the program.

- Providers, including Pitney Bowes, Endicia and Stamps.com, are authorized to generate, transmit and print the indicia barcodes, ensure that images conform to USPS standards, market and sell customized postage and fulfill customer orders.
- Partners such as Zazzle can approve imagery, market, sell and fulfill orders, but they must be associated with an authorized provider who creates the indicia using an approved postage evidencing system.
- Affiliates like Fuji can market, sell and fulfill orders, but are not authorized to approve imagery or print postage and must be associated with an authorized provider who creates the indicia using an approved postage evidencing system.

Pitney Bowes, Stamps.com, Zazzle.com and Fuji offer USPS-approved personalised postage via Stamp Expressions, PhotoStamps and ZazzleStamps and Yourstamps.com respectively.

Consumers and businesses may also print their own postage using a small, specialized, printer, such as the Pitney Bowes Stamp Expressions Printer. Recent innovations include postal kiosks, where consumers can download an image at their local convenience store. In June 2020, USPS has terminated the program for customized postage (personalised stamps) from all its officially-licensed vendors.

==== Choice of images ====
Although most postal regulations permit the exclusion of "objectionable" pictures on the stamps, in 2004 The Smoking Gun managed to create personalised stamps featuring the Rosenbergs, Jimmy Hoffa, Ted Kaczynski, Monica Lewinsky's dress, Slobodan Milošević and Nicolae Ceauşescu using the service offered by stamps.com. The firm subsequently revised its policies.

==== Stamps for hunters ====
In 2006 Ed Owens of REACT Consulting Group, a lobbyist for the Hunters Heritage Council, complained to the U.S. Postmaster General when Zazzle.com refused to create a personalised stamp that promoted hunters as conservationists. The stamp would have borne the legends "$1.7 Billion for Conservation Annually" and "Sportsmen... America's First Conservationists". The creation of the stamp was refused because, Zazzle said, it "Incorporates material that is primarily partisan, or political, in nature." REACT Consulting cited stamps created for the Humane Society of the United States (HSUS) which it said were also partisan and political but which had been accepted for production. Zazzle eventually withdrew the HSUS stamps.
