= List of postage stamps of India (1981–1990) =

This is a list of commemorative postage stamps issued by the India Post between 1981 and 1990.

== 1981 ==
#	Issue date	Description	Image	Denomination
1	2 January 1981	Mazharul Haque		35
2	1 February 1981	St. Stephen's College, Delhi		35
3	9 February 1981	Gommateshwara		100
4	27 February 1981	G. V. Mavalankar		35
5	23 March 1981	Homage to Martyrs		35
6	8 April 1981	Heinrich von Stephan		100
7	20 April 1981	International Year of Disabled Persons		100
*		Tribes of India, (Set of 4 Stamps)		
8	30 May 1981	Bhil		100
9	30 May 1981	Dandami Maria		100
10	30 May 1981	Toda		100
11	30 May 1981	Khiamngan Naga		100
12	15 June 1981	Conservation of Forests		100
13	22 June 1981	Nilmoni Phukan		35
14	23 June 1981	Sanjay Gandhi		35
15	18 July 1981	SLV-3 and Rohini		100
16	28 July 1981	IX Asian Games, Delhi 1982 (1st Issue) - Games Logo		100
17	1 September 1981	IX Asian Games, Delhi 1982 (1st Issue) - Mascot and Stylised Hockey Player		100
*		Indian flowering trees, (Set of 4 Stamps)		
18	1 September 1981	flame of the forest		35
19	1 September 1981	Crateva		50
20	1 September 1981	golden shower		100
21	1 September 1981	Bauhinia		200
22	16 October 1981	World Food Day		100
*		Indian butterflies, (Set of 4 Stamps)		
23	20 October 1981	Stichophthalma camadeva		35
24	20 October 1981	Cethosia biblis		50
25	20 October 1981	Cyrestis achates		100
26	20 October 1981	Teinopalpus imperialis		200
27	31 October 1981	Bellary Raghava		35
28	9 November 1981	Mahar Regiment		35
29	14 November 1981	Children's Day		35
30	19 November 1981	IX Asian Games, Delhi 1982 (2nd Issue)		100
31	27 November 1981	Kashi Prasad Jayaswal		35
32	29 November 1981	Solidarity With The Palestinian People		100
33	4 December 1981	Indian Navy		35
34	14 December 1981	Henry Heras		35
35	24 December 1981	IOCOM Submarine Telephone Cable		100
36	29 December 1981	Fifth World Cup Hockey, Bombay		100
37	30 December 1981	IX Asian Games, Delhi 1982 (3rd Issue)		100

== 1982 ==
#	Issue date	Description	Image	Denomination
1	28 January 1982	100 Years of Telephone Services		200
2	8 February 1982	12th International Conference of Soil Science, New Delhi		100
3	2 March 1982	Sir J. J. School of Art, Bombay		35
4	15 March 1982	Three Musicians, Picasso		285
*		Festival of India, (Set of 3 Stamps)		
5	23 March 1892	Ancient Sculpture		200
6	23 March 1982	Kaliya Mardana		305
7	23 March 1982	Radio Telescope, Ooty		305
8	24 March 1982	Robert Koch - Centenary of Discovery of Tubercle Bacillus		35
9	9 May 1982	Durgabai Deshmukh		35
*		Himalayan flowers, (Set of 4 Stamps)		
10	29 May 1982	Meconopsis aculeata		35
11	29 May 1982	Inula grandiflora		100
12	29 May 1982	Arisaema wallachianum		200
13	29 May 1982	Saussurea obvallata		285
14	19 June 1982	APPLE Satellite		200
15	1 July 1982	Bidhan Chandra Roy		50
16	14 August 1982	Oil Exploration		100
*		Festival of India, (Set of 2 Stamps)		
17	17 September 1982	Raza		200
18	17 September 1982	M. F. Husain		305
19	1 October 1982	Wildlife Week - Kashmir stag		285
20	8 October 1982	50 Years of Indian Air Force		100
21	15 October 1982	50 Years of Civil Aviation		325
22	21 October 1982	Police Day - Police Beat Patrol		50
23	23 October 1982	100 Years of Post Office Savings Bank		50
24	30 October 1982	IX Asian Games, Delhi 1982 (4th Issue)		100
25	2 November 1982	Troposcatter Communication Link: India - USSR		305
26	6 November 1982	IX Asian Games, Delhi 1982 (5th Issue)		100
27	14 November 1982	Children's Day		50
*		IX Asian Games, Delhi 1982, (6th Issue) (Set of 4 Stamps)		
28	19 November 1982	Cycling		50
29	19 November 1982	Javelin throw		200
30	19 November 1982	Discus Throw		285
31	19 November 1982	Football		325
*		IX Asian Games, Delhi 1982, (7th Issue) (Set of 2 Stamps)		
32	25 November 1982	Yachting		200
33	25 November 1982	Rowing		285
34	10 December 1982	50 Years of Indian Military Academy, Dehradun		50
35	15 December 1982	Purushottam Das Tandon Birth Centenary		50
36	18 December 1982	Centenary of Darjeeling Himalayan Railway		285
*		'INPEX - 82', National Stamp Exhibition, New Delhi, (Set of 2 Stamps)		
37	30 December 1982	'INPEX - 82', National Stamp Exhibition, New Delhi		50
38	30 December 1982	'INPEX - 82', National Stamp Exhibition, New Delhi		200

== 1983 ==
#	Issue date	Description	Image	Denomination
1	9 January 1983	First Indian Antarctic Expedition		100
2	30 January 1983	Franklin Delano Roosevelt		325
3	7 February 1983	Siberian crane		285
4	16 February 1983	Jat Regiment		50
*		Seventh Non-aligned Summit, (Set of 2 Stamps)		
5	7 March 1983	Logo		100
6	7 March 1983	Jawaharlal Nehru		200
*		Commonwealth Day, (Set of 2 Stamps)		
7	14 March 1983	Mahabalipuram		100
8	14 March 1983	Gomukh of Gangotri Glacier		200
9	25 March 1983	86th Session of International Olympic Committee		100
10	4 April 1983	St. Francis of Assisi		100
11	5 May 1983	Death Centenary of Karl Marx		100
12	18 May 1983	Death Centenary of Charles Darwin		200
13	30 May 1983	50 Years of Kanha National Park		100
14	18 July 1983	World Communications Year		100
15	24 July 1983	Simon Bolivar		200
*		India's Struggle for Freedom, (Set of 3 Stamps)		
16	9 August 1983	Meera Behn		50
17	9 August 1983	Mahadev Desai		50
18	9 August 1983	India's Struggle for Freedom - A.I.C.C. Quit India Resolution August, 1942		50
19	17 August 1983	Ram Nath Chopra		50
20	27 August 1983	Indian Mountaineering Foundation - Nanda Devi Peak		200
21	15 September 1983	Centenary of Bombay Natural History Society		100
22	23 September 1983	Rock Garden, Chandigarh		100
*		Indian wildlife, (Set of 2 Stamps)		
23	1 October 1983	golden langur		100
24	1 October 1983	lion tailed macaque		200
25	3 October 1983	5th General Assembly of World Tourism Organisation, New Delhi - Ghats of Varanasi		200
26	7 October 1983	Krishna Kant Handique		50
27	18 October 1983	Hemu Kalani		50
28	14 November 1983	Children's Day		50
29	15 November 1983	Acharya Vinoba Bhave		50
*		Bi-Centenary of Man's First Flight, (Set of 2 Stamps)		
30	21 November 1983	'UDAN KHATOLA'		100
31	21 November 1983	Montgolfier Balloon, 1783		200
32	22 November 1983	Project Tiger		200
*		Commonwealth Heads of Government Meeting, New Delhi, (Set of 2 Stamps)		
33	23 November 1983	Logo		100
34	23 November 1983	Goan Couple of Early 19th Century		200
35	5 December 1983	Birth Centenary of Nandalal Bose - Pratiksha		100
36	28 December 1983	Surendranath Banerjee		50

== 1984 ==
#	Issue date	Description	Image	Denomination
1	7 January 1984	7th Light Cavalry		100
2	9 January 1984	The Deccan Horse		100
3	15 January 1984	The Asiatic Society		100
4	1 February 1984	100 Years of Postal Life Insurance		100
5	12 February 1984	President's Review of the Fleet (Se-tenant of four )		100 (each)
6	12 February 1984	President's Review of the Fleet (Se-tenant of four )		100 (each)
7	12 February 1984	President's Review of the Fleet (Se-tenant of four )		100 (each)
8	12 February 1984	President's Review of the Fleet (Se-tenant of four )		100 (each)
9	20 February 1984	XII International Leprosy Congress		100
10	21 February 1984	Vasudev Balwant Phadke		50
11	3 April 1984	Indo-Soviet Joint Manned Space Fight		300
12	23 April 1984	Baba Kanshi Ram		50
*		India's Struggle for Freedom, (Set of 4 Stamps)		
13	10 May 1984	Mangal Pandey		50
14	10 May 1984	Nana Sahib		50
15	10 May 1984	Tatya Tope		50
16	10 May 1984	Begum Hazrat Mahal		50
17	11 June 1984	G. D. Birla		50
*		XXIII Olympics, (Set of 4 Stamps)		
18	28 July 1984	Basketball		50
19	28 July 1984	High Jump		100
20	28 July 1984	A girl doing floor exercises		200
21	28 July 1984	Weight Lifting		250
*		Forts of India, (Set of 4 Stamps)		
22	3 August 1984	Gwalior		50
23	3 August 1984	Vellore		100
24	3 August 1984	Simhagad		150
25	3 August 1984	Jodhpur		200
26	14 September 1984	Baburao Vishnu Paradkar		50
27	23 October 1984	Dr. D. N. Wadia		100
28	14 November 1984	Children’s Day		50
29	19 November 1984	Indira Gandhi		50
30	20 November 1984	12th World Mining Congress		100
31	3 December 1984	Rajendra Prasad Birth Centenary		50
*		Roses, (Set of 2 Stamps)		
32	23 December 1984	Mrinalini		150
33	23 December 1984	Sugandha		200

== 1985 ==
#	Issue date	Description	Image	Denomination
1	2 January 1985	Fergusson College, Pune		100
2	10 January 1985	Narhar Vishnu Gadgil		50
3	15 January 1985	Regiment of Artillery		100
4	31 January 1985	Indira Gandhi : Crusader for World Peace		200
5	2 February 1985	Minicoy Lighthouse		100
6	20 February 1985	Medical College, Calcutta		100
7	6 March 1985	Medical College, Madras		100
8	29 March 1985	The Assam Rifles-Sentinels of the North-East		100
9	1 April 1985	50 Years of Potato Research		50
10	4 April 1985	Baba Jassa Singh Ahluwalia		50
11	12 April 1985	St. Xavier's College, Kolkata		100
12	18 May 1985	White winged wood duck		200
*		Bougainvillea, (Set of 2 Stamps)		
13	5 June 1985	Mahara		50
14	5 June 1985	H. B. Singh		100
15	7 June 1985	Yaudheya Coin - Festival of India		200
16	13 June 1985	Didarganj Yakshi - Festival of India		100
17	21 July 1985	Jairamdas Daulatram		50
18	22 July 1985	Nellie Sengupta - Jatindra Mohan Sengupta		50
19	19 September 1985	Swami Haridas		100
20	10 October 1985	Border Roads Organisation		200
21	24 October 1985	40th Anniversary of the United Nations		200
22	31 October 1985	Indira Gandhi-In the service of the Nation		200
23	14 November 1985	Children’s Day		50
24	19 November 1985	XIX General Assembly International Astronomical Union, New Delhi		100
25	19 November 1985	Indira Gandhi - Priyadarshini		300
26	25 November 1985	St. Stephen's Hospital, Delhi		100
27	2 December 1985	Kakasaheb Kalelkar		50
*		South Asian Regional Co-operation, (Set of 2 Stamps)		
28	8 December 1985	Map Showing Member Countries		100
29	8 December 1985	Flag of Member Nations		300
30	21 December 1985	Shyama Shastri		100
31	23 December 1985	Master Tara Singh		50
32	24 December 1985	Ravishankar Maharaj		50
33	24 December 1985	International Youth Year		200
34	27 December 1985	Johann Sebastian Bach and George Frideric Handel		500
35	28 December 1985	Centenary of the Indian National Congress (Se-tenant of 4)		100 each
36	28 December 1985	Centenary of the Indian National Congress (Se-tenant of 4)		100 each
37	28 December 1985	Centenary of the Indian National Congress (Se-tenant of 4)		100 each
38	28 December 1985	Centenary of the Indian National Congress (Se-tenant of 4)		100 each

== 1986 ==
#	Issue date	Description	Image	Denomination
1	11 February 1986	Naval Dockyard Bombay 250th Anniversary		250
*		INPEX-86, (Set of 2 Stamps)		
2	14 February 1986	Hawa Mahal		50
3	14 February 1986	Mobile Camel Post Office		200
4	16 February 1986	INS Vikrant		200
*		75th Anniversary of First Aerial Post, (Set of 2 Stamps)		
5	18 February 1986	Humber Sommer Bi-plane & Latter mail Planes & 1911 Postmark		50
6	18 February 1986	Modern Indian Airlines Plane & Humber Sommer Bi-plane		300
7	22 February 1986	Sixth Triennale-India 1986		100
8	13 March 1986	Chaitanya Mahaprabhu		200
9	12 April 1986	Mayo College, Ajmer		100
10	31 May 1986	World Cup Football Mexico		500
11	14 August 1986	Bhim Sen Sachar		50
12	8 September 1986	Swami Sivananda		200
*		X Asian Games, (Set of 2 Stamps)		
13	16 September 1986	Women's Volleyball		150
14	16 September 1986	Men's Hurdle		300
15	9 October 1986	200 Years of Madras GPO		500
16	17 October 1986	1 Para (Commando)		300
17	21 October 1986	125th Anniversary of Indian Police Se-tenant		150, 200
18	24 October 1986	International Year of Peace 1986		500
19	14 November 1986	Children’s Day		50
*		40th Anniversary of UNICEF Children's Fund, (Set of 2 Stamps)		
21	11 December 1986	Growth Monitoring		50
22	11 December 1986	Inoculating a baby		500
23	12 December 1986	Tansen		100
*		50 Years of Corbett National Park, (Set of 2 Stamps)		
24	15 Dec 1986	Indian Elephant		100
25	15 December 1986	Gharial		200
26	26 December 1986	Alluri Sitarama Raju		50
27	29 December 1986	Sagarmal Gopa		50
28	30 December 1986	Veer Surendra Sai		50
29	30 December 1986	St. Martha's Hospital, Bangalore		100

== 1987 ==
#	Issue date	Description	Image	Denomination
1	10 January 1987	First Indian Sailing Expedition Around the World 1985-87		650
2	25 January 1987	Africa Fund		650
3	11 February 1987	29th Congress of ICC New Delhi		500
4	13 February 1987	Hakim Ajmal Khan		60
5	18 March 1987	Lala Har Dayal		60
6	21 March 1987	M. N. Roy		60
*		Centenary of South Eastern Railway, (Set of 4 Stamps)		
7	28 March 1987	Service to Five Steel Plants & S.E. Railway Insigia		100
8	28 March 1987	PL Type Narrow Gauge Locomotive on Naupada-Gurupur Sec.		150
9	28 Mar 1987	Electro Locomotive on Viaduct 1987 On Kottavasla-Kirandul Sec.		200
10	28 March 1987	ZE Type Narrow Gauge Locomotive On Gondia-Nagpur Sec.		400
11	14 April 1987	Kalia Bhomora Bridge, Assam		200
12	16 April 1987	Madras Christian College		150
13	25 April 1987	T. Ramaswamy Chowdary		60
14	1 May 1987	Shree Shree Ma Anandamayee		100
15	8 May 1987	Gurudev Rabindranath Tagore		200
16	10 May 1987	The Garhwal Rifles and the Garhwal Scouts		100
17	11 May 1987	J. Krishnamurti		60
18	3 June 1987	7 Mechanised Battalion (1 Dogra)		100
*		India 89 - World Philatelic Exhibition, (Set of 2 Stamps)		
19	15 June 1987	Stylised Swan, Regarded as Messenger of Good News (Exhibition Logo)		50
20	15 June 1987	Hall of Nations, Pragati Maidan, New Delhi		500
21	17 June 1987	Dr. Kailas Nath Katju		60
22	3 July 1987	Festival of India - Sadyah-Snata, Sanghol		650
23	15 August 1987	Forty Years of Freedom		60
24	20 Aug 1987	Sant Harchand Singh Longowal		100
25	22 August 1987	S. Satyamurti		60
26	1 September 1987	Guru Ghasidas		60
27	2 September 1987	Sri Sri Thakur Anukulchandra		100
28	23 September 1987	University of Allahabad Centenary		200
29	1 October 1987	Phool Walon Ki Sair		200
30	2 October 1987	Chhatrasal		60
31	5 October 1987	International Year of Shelter for the Homeless		500
*		Asia Regional Conference of the Rotary International, (Set of 2 Stamps)		
32	14 October 1987	Map of Asia & Rotary Logo		60
33	14 October 1987	Oral Polio Vaccination		650
34	15 October 1987	100 Years of Service to the Blind		100
35	15 October 1987	Eye Donation		200
*		India – 89 (World Philatelic Exhibition), (Set of 4 Stamps)		
36	17 October 1987	Iron Pillar, Delhi		60
37	17 October 1987	India Gate, New Delhi		150
38	17 October 1987	Dewan-e-Khas in Red Fort, Delhi		500
39	17 October 1987	Old Fort, Delhi		650
40	2 November 1987	Tyagmurti Goswami Ganeshdutt		60
41	14 November 1987	Children’s Day		60
*		Indian Trees, (Set of 4 Stamps)		
42	19 November 1987	chinar		60
43	19 November 1987	pipal		150
44	19 November 1987	sal		500
45	19 November 1987	banyan		650
46	21 November 1987	Festival of USSR in India		500
*		Wild Life, (Set of 2 Stamps)		
47	29 November 1987	white tiger – Rewa		100
48	29 November 1987	snow leopard		500
49	10 December 1987	Rameshwari Nehru		60
50	10 December 1987	Veer Narayan Singh		60
51	20 December 1987	Father Kuriakose Elias Chavara		60
52	21 December 1987	Dr. Rajah Sir M. A. Muthiah Chettiar		60
53	26 December 1987	Sri Harmandir Sahib, Amritsar Golden Temple		60
54	27 December 1987	Rukmini Devi Arundale		60
55	31 December 1987	Dr. Hira Lal		60
56	31 December 1987	Pandit Hriday Nath Kunzru		60

== 1988 ==
#	Issue date	Description	Image	Denomination
1	7 January 1988	75th Session of the Indian Science Congress Association		400
2	28 January 1988	13th Asian Pacific Dental Congress		400
3	2 February 1988	Mohan Lal Sukhadia		60
4	3 February 1988	U. Tirot Sing		60
5	4 February 1988	S. K. Sinha		60
6	19 February 1988	Bicentenary of the 4th Battalion of the Kumaon Regiment		100
7	22 February 1988	Balgandharva		60
8	24 February 1988	The Mechanised Infantry Regiment		100
9	26 February 1988	B. N. Rau		60
10	27 February 1988	Chandrashekhar Azad		60
11	7 March 1988	G. B. Pant		60
12	14 March 1988	Government Mohindra College, Patiala		100
13	17 March 1988	Dr. D. V. Gundappa		60
14	20 March 1988	Rani Avanti Bai		60
15	23 March 1988	100 years of Malayala Manorama		100
16	26 March 1988	Maharshi Dadhichi		60
17	21 March 1988	Mohammad Iqbal		60
18	1 May 1988	Samarth Ramdas		60
19	2 May 1988	Swathi Thirunal Rama Varma		60
20	9 May 1988	First War of Independence-1857		60
21	9 May 1988	Bhaurao Patil		60
*		Himalayan Peaks, (Set of 4 Stamps)		
22	19 May 1988	Broad Peak		150
23	19 May 1988	K2 (Godwin Austin)		400
24	19 May 1988	Kanchenjunga		500
25	19 May 1988	Nanda Devi		650
26	24 May 1988	Love and Care for Elders		60
27	30 May 1988	100 Years of the Victoria Terminus, Bombay		100
28	31 May 1988	Lawrence School, Lovedale		100
29	5 June 1988	Khejri tree		60
30	18 June 1988	Dr. Anugrah Narain Singh		60
31	19 June 1988	Kuladhor Chaliha		60
32	24 June 1988	Rani Durgawati		60
33	28 June 1988	Shivprasad Gupta		60
34	28 July 1988	Acharya Shanti Dev		60
35	4 August 1988	Y. S. Parmar		60
36	16 August 1988	Freedom Forty - Swaraj Se-tenant		60 (each)
37	26 August 1988	Durgadas Rathore		60
38	6 September 1988	Sarat Chandra Bose		60
39	7 September 1988	Gopinath Kaviraj		60
40	14 September 1988	Hindi Day		60
*		Sports - 1988 & XXIV Olympic Games, Seoul (Set of 2 Stamps)		
41	17 September 1988	Indian Olympic Association		60
42	17 September 1988	Freedom Forty - Glory of Sport		500
43	6 October 1988	Baba Kharak Singh		60
44	7 October 1988	Jerdon's courser		100
*		India – 89, World Philately Exhibition, New Delhi (Set of 2 Stamps)		
45	9 October 1988	Bangalore GPO		400
46	9 October 1988	Bombay GPO		500
47	3 November 1988	The Times of India		150
48	11 November 1988	Maulana Abul Kalam Azad		60
*		Jawaharlal Nehru Centenary, (Set of 2 Stamps)		
49	14 November 1988	Jawaharlal Nehru		60
50	14 November 1988	Portrait of Jawaharlal Nehru		100
51	15 November 1988	Birsa Munda		60
52	5 December 1988	Sheikh Mohammad Abdullah		60
53	15 December 1988	Bhakra Dam		60
*		India -89 World Philatelic Exhibition, (Set of 2 Stamps)		
54	20 December 1988	Early D. L. O. Cancellation		60
55	20 December 1988	Early R. M. S. Cancellation		650
56	30 December 1988	K. M. Munshi		60

== 1989 ==
#	Issue date	Description	Image	Denomination
1	2 January 1989	Hare Krushna Mahtab		60
2	2 January 1989	Mannathu Padmanabhan		60
3	10 January 1989	Lok Sabha Secretariat		60
4	11 January 1989	State Museum, Lucknow		60
5	17 January 1989	Baldev Ram Mirdha		60
*		India-89 World Philatelic Exhibition (Set of 4 Stamps)		
6	20 January 1989	Stamp Collecting		60
7	20 January 1989	Traveller's Coach Post Office		150
8	20 January 1989	Travancore Anchal		500
9	20 January 1989	Earliest Philatelic Magazines		650
10	31 January 1989	Don Bosco		60
11	8 February 1989	3rd Cavalry		60
12	13 February 1989	Dargah Sharif, Ajmer		100
13	15 February 1989	President's Review of the Fleet		650
14	8 March 1989	B. G. Kher		60
15	29 March 1989	Shaheed Laxman Nayak		60
16	30 March 1989	Rao Gopal Singh		60
17	13 April 1989	Rajkumari Amrit Kaur		60
18	13 April 1989	S. D. Kitchlew		60
19	19 April 1989	Sydenham College, Bombay		60
20	24 April 1989	Bishnu Ram Medhi		60
21	11 May 1989	Asaf Ali		60
22	13 May 1989	Dr. N. S. Hardikar		60
23	17 May 1989	Sankaracharya		60
24	19 May 1989	Punjab University, Chandigarh		100
25	30 May 1989	75 Years of Indian Cinema		60
26	20 June 1989	Kirloskar Centenary		100
27	27 June 1989	DAV Centenary		100
28	11 July 1989	Dakshin Gangotri Post Office		100
29	19 July 1989	125th Anniversary of Allahabad Bank		60
30	27 July 1989	Central Reserve Police Force		60
31	18 August 1989	Military Farms Centenary		100
32	30 August 1989	Mustafa Kemal Atatürk		500
33	11 September 1989	Dr. S. Radhakrishnan		60
34	23 September 1989	Mohun Bagan Centenary		100
35	30 September 1989	Dr. P. Subbarayan		60
36	4 October 1989	Shyamji Krishna Varma		60
37	6 October 1989	Sayajirao Gaekwad-III		60
38	14 October 1989	'Use PINCODE' campaign		60
39	19 October 1989	Namakkal Kavignar		60
40	21 October 1989	18th International Epilepsy Congress and XIV World Congress on Neurology		650
41	26 October 1989	Pandita Ramabai		60
42	3 November 1989	Pigeon Post		100
43	6 November 1989	Acharya Narendra Deva		60
44	11 November 1989	Acharya Kripalani		60
45	14 November 1989	Jawaharlal Nehru		100
46	19 November 1989	8th Asian Track and Field Meet		100
47	20 November 1989	Gurunath Bewoor		60
48	8 December 1989	Bal Krishna Sharma Naveen		60
49	15 December 1989	Bombay Art Society		100
50	20 December 1989	Likh florican		200
51	29 December 1989	A Hundred Years of Oil		60

== 1990 ==
#	Issue date	Description	Image	Denomination
1	17 January 1990	Dr. M. G. Ramachandran		60
2	29 January 1990	Sukhna Shramdan, Chandigarh		100
3	21 February 1990	Bombay Engineer Group Presentation of Colours		60
4	2 May 1990	Asian Development Bank		200
5	6 May 1990	150th Anniversary of First Postage Stamp		600
6	17 May 1990	Ho Chi Minh		200
7	29 May 1990	Charan Singh		100
8	30 July 1990	Indian Peace Keeping Force		200
9	31 July 1990	Indian Council of Agricultural Research		200
10	11 August 1990	Khudiram Bose		100
11	16 August 1990	Indo-Soviet Issue Se-tenant		100, 650
12	24 August 1990	K. Kelappan		100
13	5 September 1990	Care for the Girl Child		100
14	8 September 1990	International Literacy Year		100
15	10 September 1990	Safe Water		400
16	28 September 1990	Pandit Sunderlal Sharma		60
17	29 September 1990	XI Asian Games: Kabaddi		100
18	29 September 1990	XI Asian Games: Racing		400
19	29 September 1990	XI Asian Games: Cycling		400
20	29 September 1990	XI Asian Games: Archery		650
21	1 October 1990	A. K. Gopalan		100
22	1 October 1990	3rd & 5th Battalions of Gorkha Rifles		200
23	19 October 1990	Surajmal Misrana		200
24	14 October 1990	Children's Day		100
25	30 October 1990	Border Security Force		500
26	17 December 1990	Greetings		100
27	17 December 1990	Greetings		400
28	24 December 1990	Cities of India: Bikaner		400
29	24 December 1990	Cities of India: Hyderabad		500
30	24 December 1990	Cities of India: Cuttack		650
31	26 December 1990	Bhakta Kanakadasa		100
32	28 December 1990	Tercentenary of Kolkata: Shaheed Minar		100
33	28 December 1990	Tercentenary of Kolkata: Ganga - The River of Life		600
34	31 December 1990	Jñānēśvarī		200
