= Surya Narayan Vyas =

Indian astrologer and diviner

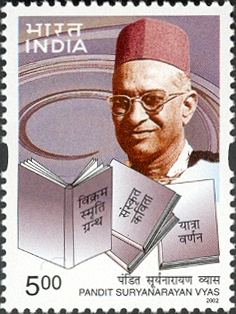
- Born: 2 March 1902; Ujjain, India
- Died: 22 June 1976 (aged 74)
- Occupations: Astrologer; Diviner
- Known for: Prescribing time for Indian Independence
- Awards: Padma Bhushan

Surya Narayan Vyas (2 March 1902 in Ujjain, India – 22 June 1976) was an Indian astrologer and diviner from Ujjain, in the Indian state of Madhya Pradesh. He was known to be the one who prescribed 14 August 1947 and 15 August 1947 as the dates for Pakistan and Indian independence respectively. He is reported to have prophesied several other incidents such as the deaths of Lal Bahadur Shastri and Sardar Vallabhai Patel and the emergence of India as a global power in the 21st century. He was a member of the Advisory Board to the Government of Madhya Pradesh during the tenure of Govind Narayan Singh from 1967–1969. The Government of India awarded him the third highest civilian honour of the Padma Bhushan, in 1958, for his contributions to astrology. India Post issued a commemorative stamp on Vyas in 2002.

== See also ==
- List of postage stamps of India (2000–04)
