= List of postage stamps of India (1947–1950) =

This is a list of commemorative postage stamps issued by the India Post between 1947 and 1950.

== 1947 ==
#	Issue date	Description	Image	Denomination
*		Independence		
1	21 November 1947	National Flag		3½ anna
2	15 December 1947	Asokan Capital		1½ anna
3	15 December 1947	Douglas DC-4		12 anna

== 1948 ==
#	Issue date	Description	Image	Denomination
1	29 May 1948	Inauguration of India–UK Air Service		12 anna
*		First Anniversary of Independence (Gandhi Mourning Issue, set of 4 stamps)		
2	15 August 1948	Mahatma Gandhi		1½ anna
3	15 August 1948	Mahatma Gandhi		3½ anna
4	15 August 1948	Mahatma Gandhi		12 anna
5	15 August 1948	Mahatma Gandhi		10 Rs

== 1949 ==
#	Issue date	Description	Image	Denomination
*		75th Anniversary of formation of Universal Postal Union		
1	10 October 1949	Universal Postal Union		9 pies
2	10 October 1949	Universal Postal Union		2 anna
3	10 October 1949	Universal Postal Union		3½ anna
4	10 October 1949	Universal Postal Union		12 anna

== 1950 ==
#	Issue date	Description	Image	Denomination
*		Inauguration of Republic of India (Set of 4 Stamps)		
1	26 January 1950	Rejoicing Crowds		2 anna
2	26 January 1950	Quill, Ink Well and Verse		3½ anna
3	26 January 1950	Ear of Corn and Plough		4 anna
4	26 January 1950	Spinning-wheel and Cloth		12 anna
