= List of postage stamps of India (1961–1970) =

Postage Stamps Of India

This is a list of commemorative postage stamps issued by the India Post between 1961 and 1970.

== 1961 ==
| # | Issue date | Description | Image | Denomination |
|---|---|---|---|---|
| 1 | 6 January 1961 | Tyagaraja | | 15 np |
| * | | 50th Anniversary of First Official Airmail Flight, Allahabad to Naini (Set of 3 Stamps) | | |
| 2 | 18 February 1961 | First Air Mail Post - Golden Jubilee | | 5 np |
| 3 | 18 February 1961 | First Air Mail Post - Golden Jubilee | | 15 np |
| 4 | 18 February 1961 | First Air Mail Post - Golden Jubilee | | 1 Rs |
| 5 | 17 April 1961 | Chhatrapati Shivaji | | 15 np |
| 6 | 6 May 1961 | Motilal Nehru Birth Centenary | | 15 np |
| 7 | 7 May 1961 | Rabindranath Tagore Birth Centenary | | 15 np |
| 8 | 8 June 1961 | Silver Jubilee of All India Radio | | 15 np |
| 9 | 2 August 1961 | Birth Centenary of Acharya Prafulla Chandra Roy | | 15 np |
| 10 | 1 September 1961 | Vishnu Narayan Bhatkhande Birth Centenary | | 15 np |
| 11 | 14 November 1961 | National Children's Day | | 15 np |
| 12 | 14 November 1961 | Indian Industries Fair, New Delhi | | 15 np |
| 13 | 21 November 1961 | Centenary of Scientific Forestry | | 15 np |
| * | | Centenary of Archaeological Survey of India (Set of 2 Stamps) | | |
| 14 | 14 December 1961 | Pitalkhora Yaksha | | 15 np |
| 15 | 14 December 1961 | KalibanganSeal | | 90 np |
| 16 | 25 December 1961 | Birth Centenary of Pandit Madan Mohan Malaviya | | 15 np |

== 1962 ==
| # | Issue date | Description | Image | Denomination |
|---|---|---|---|---|
| 1 | 1 January 1962 | Inauguration of Gauhati Oil Refinery | | 15 np |
| 2 | 26 January 1962 | Birth Centenary of Madame Bhikaiji Cama | | 15 np |
| 3 | 26 January 1962 | Inauguration of Panchayati Raj in rural administration | | 15 np |
| 4 | 4 March 1962 | Swami Dayanand Saraswati | | 15 np |
| 5 | 25 March 1962 | Ganesh Shankar Vidyarthi | | 15 np |
| 6 | 7 April 1962 | The world united against Malaria Eradication | | 15 np |
| 7 | 13 May 1962 | Retirement of President Dr.Rajendra Prasad | | 15 np |
| | | Centenary of High Courts. (Set of 3 Stamps) | | |
| 8 | 1 July 1962 | Calcutta High Court | | 15 np |
| 9 | 6 August 1962 | High court of judicature madras | | 15 np |
| 10 | 14 August 1962 | High court of Bombay | | 15 np |
| 11 | 15 August 1962 | Birth Centenary of Ramabai Ranade | | 15 np |
| 12 | 1 October 1962 | Rhino - Wild Life Week | | 15 np |
| 13 | 14 November 1962 | National Children's Day | | 15 np |
| 14 | 3 December 1962 | 19th International Congress of Ophthalmology, New Delhi | | 15 np |
| 15 | 22 December 1962 | 75th Birth Anniversary of Srinivasa Ramanujan | | 15 np |

== 1963 ==
| # | Issue date | Description | Image | Denomination |
|---|---|---|---|---|
| 1 | 17 January 1963 | Birth Centenary of Swami Vivekananda | | 15 np |
| 2 | 2 February 1963 | Kalidasa Overprint Provisional issue. | | 1 R |
| 3 | 21 March 1963 | Freedom from Hunger | | 15 np |
| 4 | 8 May 1963 | Red Cross Centenary | | 15 np |
| * | | Defence Campaign. (Set of 2 Stamps) | | |
| 5 | 15 August 1963 | Artillery and army helicopter | | 15 np |
| 6 | 15 August 1963 | Sentry on duty and parachute dropping supplies | | 1 R |
| 7 | 4 September 1963 | Dr.Dadabhoy Naoroji | | 15 np |
| 8 | 1 October 1963 | Dr.Annie Besant | | 15 np |
| * | | Wild Life Preservation. (set of 5 stamps) | | |
| 9 | 7 October 1963 | Gaur | | 10 np |
| 10 | 7 October 1963 | Himalayan Panda | | 15 np |
| 11 | 7 October 1963 | Indian elephant | | 30 np |
| 12 | 7 October 1963 | Tiger | | 50 np |
| 13 | 7 October 1963 | Indian Lion | | 1 R |
| 14 | 14 November 1963 | National Children's Day | | 15 np |
| 15 | 10 December 1963 | 15th Anniversary of Declaration of Human Rights | | 15 np |

== 1964 ==
| # | Issue date | Description | Image | Denomination |
|---|---|---|---|---|
| 1 | 4 January 1964 | 26th International Orientalists Congress, New Delhi | | 15 np |
| 2 | 4 January 1964 | Utkalmani Pandit Gopabandhu Das | | 15 np |
| 3 | 14 January 1964 | 400th Death Anniversary of Purandaradasa | | 15 np |
| * | | 67th Birth Anniversary of Subhas Chandra Bose. (Set of 2 Stamps) | | |
| 4 | 23 January 1964 | Bose and INA insignia | | 15 np |
| 5 | 23 January 1964 | Bose leading Indian National Army | | 55 np |
| 6 | 13 February 1964 | 85th Birth Anniversary of Sarojini Naidu | | 15 np |
| 7 | 22 February 1964 | 20th Death Anniversary of Kasturba Gandhi | | 15 np |
| 8 | 16 March 1964 | Dr. Waldermar Mordecai Wolff Haffkine | | 15 np |
| 9 | 12 June 1964 | Nehru Mourning Issue | | 15 p |
| 10 | 29 June 1964 | Birth Centenary of Sir Asutosh Mookerjee | | 15 p |
| 11 | 15 August 1964 | 92nd Birth Anniversary of Sri Aurobindo | | 15 p |
| 12 | 27 September 1964 | Raja Rammohun Roy | | 15 p |
| 13 | 9 November 1964 | 6th General Assembly of International Organization for Standardization, New Delhi | | 15 p |
| 14 | 14 November 1964 | National Children's Day | | 15 p |
| 15 | 2 December 1964 | St. Thomas | | 15 p |
| 16 | 14 December 1964 | 22nd International Geological Congress, New Delhi | | 15 p |

== 1965 ==
| # | Issue date | Description | Image | Denomination |
|---|---|---|---|---|
| 1 | 7 January 1965 | Jamsetji Nusserwanji Tata | | 15 p |
| 2 | 28 January 1965 | Birth Centenary of Lala Lajpat Rai | | 15 p |
| 3 | 8 February 1965 | 20th International Chamber of Commerce Congress, New Delhi | | 15 p |
| 4 | 5 April 1965 | National Maritime Day | | 15 p |
| 5 | 15 April 1965 | Death Centenary of Abraham Lincoln | | 15 p |
| 6 | 17 May 1965 | Centenary of International Telecommunication Union | | 15 p |
| 7 | 27 May 1965 | First Anniversary of Nehru's Death | | 15 p |
| 8 | 26 June 1965 | International Co-operation Year | | 15 p |
| 9 | 15 August 1965 | Indian Mount Everest Expedition | | 15 p |
| 10 | 10 September 1965 | Pandit Govind Ballabh Pant | | 15 p |
| 11 | 31 October 1965 | 90th Birth Anniversary of Sardar Vallabhbhai Patel | | 15 p |
| 12 | 5 November 1965 | 95th Birth Anniversary of Deshbandhu Chittaranjan Das | | 15 p |
| 13 | 17 November 1965 | Vidyapati Thakur | | 15 p |

== 1966 ==
| # | Issue date | Description | Image | Denomination |
|---|---|---|---|---|
| 1 | 24 January 1966 | 15th Pacific Area Travel Association Conference, New Delhi | | 15 p |
| 2 | 26 January 1966 | Valour of Indian Armed Forces in 1965 war | | 15 p |
| 3 | 26 January 1966 | Lal Bahadur Shastri Mourning issue | | 15 p |
| 4 | 5 April 1966 | Kambar | | 15 p |
| 5 | 14 April 1966 | 75th Birth Anniversary of Dr. Bhimrao Ramji Ambedkar | | 15 p |
| 6 | 23 April 1966 | Babu Kunwar Singh | | 15 p |
| 7 | 9 May 1966 | Birth Centenary of Gopal Krishna Gokhale | | 15 p |
| 8 | 15 May 1966 | Acharya Mahavir Prasad Dvivedi | | 15 p |
| 9 | 28 June 1966 | Maharaja Ranjit Singh | | 15 p |
| 10 | 4 August 1966 | Dr.Homi Jehangir Bhabha | | 15 p |
| 11 | 11 November 1966 | Maulana Abul Kalam Azad | | 15 p |
| 12 | 11 November 1966 | 60th Death Anniversary of Swami Rama Tirtha | | 15 p |
| 13 | 14 November 1966 | National Children's Day | | 15 p |
| 14 | 25 November 1966 | Centenary of Allahabad High Court | | 15 p |
| 15 | 12 December 1966 | Family Planning Week | | 15 p |
| 16 | 31 December 1966 | India's Hockey Victory in 5th Asian Games, Bangkok | | 15 p |

== 1967 ==
| # | Issue date | Description | Image | Denomination |
|---|---|---|---|---|
| 1 | 11 January 1967 | First Death Anniversary of Lal Bahadur Shastri | | 15 p |
| 2 | 13 January 1967 | 4th Indian General Election | | 15 p |
| 3 | 17 January 1967 | 300th Birth Anniversary of Guru Gobind Singh | | 15 p |
| 4 | 19 March 1967 | International Tourist Year | | 15 p |
| 5 | 16 April 1967 | First Death Anniversary of Acharya Nandalal Bose | | 15 p |
| 6 | 1 May 1967 | Survey of India Bicentenary | | 15 p |
| 7 | 11 May 1967 | 800th Death Anniversary of Basaveswara | | 15 p |
| 8 | 30 May 1967 | Narsinha Mehta | | 15 p |
| 9 | 11 June 1967 | Maharana Pratap | | 15 p |
| 10 | 21 August 1967 | Narayana Guru | | 15 p |
| 11 | 5 September 1967 | Dr.Sarvepalli Radhakrishnan | | 15 p |
| 12 | 1 October 1967 | 25th Anniversary of Quit India Movement | | 15 p |
| 13 | 9 November 1967 | Centenary of Indo-European Telegraph Service | | 15 p |
| 14 | 12 November 1967 | World Wrestling Championships, New Delhi | | 15 p |
| 15 | 12 December 1967 | 4th Anniversary of Statehood of Nagaland | | 15 p |
| 16 | 26 December 1967 | Rashbehari Basu | | 15 p |
| 17 | 27 December 1967 | Diamond Jubilee of Scout Movement in India | | 15 p |

== 1968 ==
| # | Issue date | Description | Image | Denomination |
|---|---|---|---|---|
| 1 | 1 January 1968 | International Year for Human Rights | | 15 p |
| 2 | 3 January 1968 | 2nd International Conference-Seminar of Tamil Studies, Madras | | 15 p |
| 3 | 1 February 1968 | 2nd United Nations Conference on Trade and Development, New Delhi | | 15 p |
| 4 | 20 February 1968 | Amrita Bazar Patrika Centenary | | 15 p |
| 5 | 28 March 1968 | Birth Centenary of Maxim Gorky | | 15 p |
| 6 | 31 March 1968 | First Triennale, New Delhi | | 15 p |
| 7 | 1 July 1968 | Opening of 1,00,000th Post Office at Brahmpur, Chaurasta, Bihar | | 20 p |
| 8 | 17 July 1968 | Wheat Revolution | | 20 p |
| 9 | 17 September 1968 | 30th Death Anniversary of Gaganendranath Tagore | | 20 p |
| 10 | 5 October 1968 | Birth Centenary of Lakshminath Bezbaruah | | 20 p |
| * | | XIX Olympic Games, Mexico City. (Set of 2 Stamps) | | |
| 11 | 12 October 1968 | Athlete's legs and Olympic Rings | | 20 p |
| 12 | 12 October 1968 | Athlete's legs and Olympic Rings | | 1 R |
| 13 | 19 October 1968 | 61st Birth Anniversary of Bhagat Singh | | 20 p |
| 14 | 21 October 1968 | 25th Anniversary of Azad Hind Government | | 20 p |
| 15 | 27 October 1968 | Birth Centenary of Sister Nivedita | | 20 p |
| 16 | 6 November 1968 | Birth Centenary of Madame Marie Curie | | 20 p |
| 17 | 1 December 1968 | 21st International Geographical Congress, New Delhi | | 20 p |
| 18 | 15 December 1968 | 400th Anniversary of Cochin Synagogue | | 20 p |
| 19 | 15 December 1968 | INS Nilgiri | | 20 p |
| * | | Indian birds Series (Set of 4 Stamps) | | |
| 20 | 31 December 1968 | Blue Magpie | | 20 p |
| 21 | 31 December 1968 | Himalayan Woodpecker | | 50 p |
| 22 | 31 December 1968 | Babbler | | 1 R |
| 23 | 31 December 1968 | Sunbird | | 20 p |

== 1969 ==
| # | Issue date | Description | Image | Denomination |
|---|---|---|---|---|
| 1 | 1 January 1969 | 130th Birth Anniversary of Bankim Chandra Chatterjee | | 20 p |
| 2 | 12 January 1969 | Birth Centenary of Dr.Bhagavan Das | | 20 p |
| 3 | 25 January 1969 | Dr. Martin Luther King | | 20 p |
| 4 | 17 February 1969 | Death Anniversary of Mirza Ghalib | | 20 p |
| 5 | 15 March 1969 | 50th Anniversary of Osmania University | | 20 p |
| 6 | 1 April 1969 | 20th Anniversary of 'ALL UP' Air Mail Scheme | | 20 p |
| 7 | 11 April 1969 | 50th Anniversary of International Labour Organization | | 20 p |
| 8 | 13 April 1969 | 50th Anniversary of Jallianwala Bagh Massacre, Amritsar | | 20 p |
| 9 | 1 May 1969 | Kasinadhuni Nageswara Rao Pantulu | | 20 p |
| 10 | 27 May 1969 | Ardaseer Cursetjee Wadia | | 20 p |
| 11 | 7 June 1969 | 150th Anniversary of Serampore College, West Bengal | | 20 p |
| 12 | 11 June 1969 | Dr.Zakir Hussain | | 20 P |
| 13 | 20 June 1969 | Birth Centenary of Laxmanrao Kirloskar | | 20 p |
| * | | Birth Centenary of Mahatma Gandhi. (Set of 4 stamps) | | |
| 14 | 2 October 1969 | Gandhiji and Kasturba | | 20 p |
| 15 | 2 October 1969 | Mahatma Gandhi | | 75 p |
| 16 | 2 October 1969 | Gandhi on the Dandi march | | 1 R |
| 17 | 2 October 1969 | Gandhi with Charkha, Sun (Truth) and Lotus (Non-Violence) | | 5 Rs |
| 18 | 14 October 1969 | 10th Anniversary of Inter-Governmental Maritime Consultative Organization | | 20 p |
| 19 | 30 October 1969 | 57th Inter-Parliamentary Conference, New Delhi | | 20 p |
| 20 | 19 November 1969 | First Man on the Moon | | 20 p |
| 21 | 23 November 1969 | 500th Birth Anniversary of Guru Nanak Dev | | 20 p |
| 22 | 24 November 1969 | International Union for the Conservation of Nature and Natural Resources Conference, New Delhi | | 20 p |
| 23 | 25 November 1969 | 90th Birth Anniversary of Sadhu Vaswani | | 20 p |
| 24 | 29 November 1969 | Birth Centenary of Thakkar Bapa | | 20 p |

== 1970 ==
| # | Issue date | Description | Image | Denomination |
|---|---|---|---|---|
| 1 | 21 January 1970 | 12th Plenary Assembly of International Radio Consultative Committee (CCIR) | | 20 p |
| 2 | 3 February 1970 | First Death Anniversary of C. N. Annadurai | | 20 p |
| 3 | 19 February 1970 | 75th Death Anniversary of Munshi Newal Kishore | | 20 p |
| 4 | 27 March 1970 | Centenary of Nalanda College | | 20 p |
| 5 | 30 March 1970 | Swami Shraddhanand | | 20 p |
| 6 | 22 April 1970 | Birth Centenary of Vladimir Illyich Lenin | | 20 p |
| 7 | 20 May 1970 | New Universal Postal Union Headquarters Building, Berne | | 20 p |
| 8 | 22 May 1970 | 425th Death Anniversary of Sher Shah Suri | | 20 p |
| 9 | 28 May 1970 | Vinayak Damodar Savarkar | | 20 p |
| 10 | 26 June 1970 | 25th Anniversary of United Nations Organisation | | 20 p |
| 11 | 18 August 1970 | Asian Productivity Year | | 20 p |
| 12 | 31 August 1970 | International Education Year (Birth Centenary of Dr. Maria Montessori) | | 20 P |
| 13 | 9 September 1970 | Jatindra Nath Mukherjee (Bagha Jatin) | | 20 p |
| 14 | 22 September 1970 | Valangaiman Sankaranarayana Srinivasa Sastri | | 20 p |
| 15 | 26 September 1970 | 150th Birth Anniversary of Iswar Chandra Vidyasagar | | 20 p |
| 16 | 14 October 1970 | Maharsi Valmiki (Author of Epic Ramayana) | | 20 p |
| 17 | 17 October 1970 | Centenary of Calcutta Port Commissioner | | 20 p |
| 18 | 29 October 1970 | 50th Anniversary of Jamia Millia Islamia University, Delhi | | 20 p |
| 19 | 4 November 1970 | Jamnalal Bajaj | | 20 p |
| 20 | 5 November 1970 | 50th Anniversary of Indian Red Cross Society | | 20 p |
| 21 | 9 November 1970 | 700th Birth Anniversary of Sant Namdeo | | 20 p |
| 22 | 16 December 1970 | Birth Bicentenary of Ludwig van Beethoven | | 20 p |
| * | | India National Philatelic Exhibition, 1970 New Delhi (Set of 2 Stamps) | | |
| 23 | 23 December 1970 | Children Examining Stamp on Gandhi | | 20 p |
| 24 | 30 December 1970 | Hands Holding Magnifier - 1969 Stamp | | 1 R |
| 25 | 27 December 1970 | Diamond Jubilee of Girl Guides Movement in India | | 20 p |
