= List of postage stamps of India (1971–1980) =

This is a list of commemorative postage stamps issued by the India Post between 1971 and 1980.

== 1971 ==
#	Issue date	Description	Image	Denomination
1	11 January 1971	Centenary of Indian Life Insurance		20 p
2	10 February 1971	Golden Jubilee of Kashi Vidyapeeth		20 p
3	10 February 1971	Sant Ravidas		20 p
4	12 February 1971	Birth Centenary of Deenabandhu Charles Freer Andrews		20 p
5	19 February 1971	15th Death Anniversary of Acharya Narendra Deo		20 p
6	10 March 1971	Census Centenary		20 p
7	14 April 1971	Ramana Maharshi		20 p
8	29 April 1971	65th Death Anniversary of Raja Ravi Varma		20 p
9	30 April 1971	Birth Centenary of Dadasaheb Phalke		20 p
10	7 August 1971	Birth Centenary of Abanindranath Tagore		20 p
11	14 September 1971	Swami Virajanand		20 p
12	12 October 1971	2,500th Anniversary of Charter of Cyrus the Great		20 p
13	31 October 1971	World Thrift Day		20 p
14	4 November 1971	25th Anniversary United Nations Educational and Cultural Organisation (UNESCO)		20 p
15	14 November 1971	National Children's Day		20 p
16	21 November 1971	1st Death Anniversary of Dr.Chandrasekhara Venkata Raman		20 p
17	24 December 1971	Golden Jubilee of Visva Bharati University, Shantiniketan, West Bengal		20 p
18	30 December 1971	CRICKET VICTORIES (Victories against West Indies and England)		20 p

== 1972 ==
#	Issue date	Description	Image	Denomination
1	26 February 1972	First Anniversary of Arvi Satellite Earth Station		20 p
2	29 May 1972	Silver Jubilee of Indian Standards Institute (ISI)		20 p
3	30 June 1972	50th Anniversary of International Union of Railways		20 p
*		XX Olympic Games, Munich (Set of 2 Stamps)		
4	10 August 1972	Hockey Player		20 p
5	10 August 1972	Various Sports and 1972		1.45 Rs
6	15 August 1972	Birth Centenary of Aurobindo		20 p
7	15 August 1972	25th Anniversary of Independence		20 p
8	15 August 1972	Greetings to Armed Forces on Silver Jubilee of Independence		20 p
9	5 September 1972	Birth Centenary of V. O. Chidambaram Pillai		20 p
*		Personality Series, (Set of 4 Stamps)		
10	16 October 1972	Birth Centenary of Bhai Vir Singh		20 p
11	16 October 1972	Birth Centenary of Tanguturi Prakasham		20 p
12	16 October 1972	300th Birth Anniversary of Vemana		20 p
13	16 October 1972	Birth Centenary of Bertrand Russell		1.45 Rs
*		Asia-72: 3rd Asian International Trade Fair, New Delhi (Set of 2 Stamps)		
14	3 November 1972	Logo of Asia ’72		20 p
15	3 November 1972	Asia '72: Hand of Buddha in ‘Abhaya Mudra’		1.45 Rs.
16	30 December 1972	First Death Anniversary of Dr.Vikram Sarabhai		20 p
17	30 December 1972	50th Anniversary of USSR		20 p

== 1973 ==
#	Issue date	Description	Image	Denomination
1	8 January 1973	'INDIPEX 73', International Stamp Exhibition, New Delhi		1.45 Rs
*		25th Anniversary of Independence (Set of 2 Stamps)		
2	26 January 1973	Ashok Chakra interlocked by 'Nāga'		20 p
3	26 January 1973	National Tri-coloured Smoke From Gnat Fighters & India Gate		1.45 Rs
4	18 February 1973	Ramakrishna Paramahamsa		20 p
5	1 March 1973	First Anniversary of Army Postal Service Corps		20 p
6	10 April 1973	'Jai Bangla', Inauguration of First Bangladesh Parliament		20 p
7	12 April 1973	Birth Centenary of Kumaran Asan		20 p
8	13 April 1973	Homage to Martyrs for Independence		20 p
9	14 April 1973	Dr. Bhimrao Ramji Ambedkar		20 p
*		Indian Miniature Paintings, (Set of 4 Stamps)		
10	5 May 1973	Radha-Kishangarh		20 p
11	5 May 1973	Dance Duet		50 p
12	5 May 1973	Lovers on Camel Back		1 R
13	5 May 1973	Taming of Elephant		2 Rs
14	15 May 1973	15th Anniversary of Indian Mountaineering Foundation, New Delhi		20 p
15	8 June 1973	25th Anniversary of Air India's International Services		1.45 Rs.
16	3 July 1973	19th Death Anniversary of St. Thomas		20 p
17	21 July 1973	Death Centenary of Michael Madhusudan Dutt		20 p
18	21 July 1973	Birth Centenary of Vishnu Digambar Paluskar		30 p
19	21 July 1973	Dr. Gerhard Armauer Hansen, Centenary of Discovery of Leprosy Bacillus		50 p
20	21 July 1973	5th Birth Centenary of Nicolaus Copernicus		1 R
21	31 July 1973	Allan Octavian Hume		20 p
22	15 August 1973	Homage to Gandhi and Nehru on 25th anniversary of Independence		20 p
*		Personality Series, (Set of 3 Stamps)		
23	27 September 1973	Romesh Chunder Dutt		20 p
24	27 September 1973	K. S. Ranjitsinhji		30 p
25	27 September 1973	Birth Centenary of Vithalbhai Patel		50 p
26	30 September 1973	Bicentenary of President's Bodyguard		20 p
27	9 October 1973	50th Anniversary of Interpol (International Criminal Police Organization)		20 p
28	17 October 1973	Syed Ahmad Khan		20 p
29	14 November 1973	National Children's Day		20 p
*		'INDIPEX – 73', India International Philatelic Exhibition, New Delhi. (Set of 3 Stamps)		
30	14 November 1973	All Roads to Delhi		20 p
31	14 November 1973	Ceremonial Elephant & Independence		1 R
32	14 November 1973	Peacock		2 Rs
33	25 November 1973	Silver Jubilee of National Cadet Corps, (NCC)		20 p
34	25 December 1973	First Death Anniversary of C. Rajagopalachari		20 p

== 1974 ==
#	Issue date	Description	Image	Denomination
*		Indian Masks (used in Dance Drama) (Set of 4 Stamps)		
1	15 April 1974	Sun		20 p
2	15 April 1974	Moon		50 p
3	15 April 1974	Narasimha		1 R
4	15 April 1974	Ravana		2 Rs
5	2 June 1974	300th Anniversary of Coronation of Chatrapati Shivaji		25 p
6	3 July 1974	Maithili Sharan Gupta		25 p
7	3 July 1974	Jainarain Vyas		25 p
8	3 July 1974	Utkal Gourab Madhusudan Das		25 p
9	15 July 1974	Kandukuri Veeresalingam		25 p
10	15 July 1974	Tipu Sultan		50 p
11	15 July 1974	Max Müller		1 R
12	1 August 1974	75th Birth Anniversary of Kamala Nehru		25 p
13	14 August 1974	World Population Year		25 p
14	24 August 1974	Varahagiri Venkata Giri		25 p
*		Centenary of Universal Postal Union, (Set of 3 Stamps)		
15	3 October 1974	U.P.U. Emblem		25 p
16	3 October 1974	'Birds & Nest' (Madhubani Style) & U.P.U. Emblem		1 R
17	3 October 1974	Arrows Encircling Globe		2 Rs
18	9 October 1974	Centenary of Mathura museum (Se-Tenant)		25 p (Each)
19	9 October 1974	Centenary of Mathura museum (Se-Tenant)		25 p (Each)
20	9 October 1974	Birth Centenary of Nicholas Roerich		1 R
21	13 November 1974	2500th Anniversary of Bhagwan Mahavira's attainment of Nirvana (Jal Mandir)		25 p
22	14 November 1974	National Children's Day		25 p
23	14 November 1974	25th Anniversary of UNICEF in India		25 p
24	16 November 1974	25th Anniversary of Indian Territorial Army		25 p
25	2 December 1974	19th International Dairy Congress, New Delhi		25 p
26	8 December 1974	Help for Mentally Retarded Children		25 p
27	12 December 1974	Birth Centenary of Guglielmo Marconi		2 Rs
28	24 December 1974	Saint Francis Xavier's Apostle Celebration		25 p

== 1975 ==
#	Issue date	Description	Image	Denomination
1	10 January 1975	World Hindi Convention, Nagpur		25
2	26 January 1975	25th Anniversary of the Republic		25
3	6 February 1975	33rd World Table Tennis Championships, Calcutta		25
4	16 February 1975	International Women's Year		25
5	8 April 1975	Bicentenary of Indian Army Ordnance Corps		25
6	11 April 1975	Centenary of Arya Samaj		20
7	12 April 1975	World Telugu Conference, Hyderabad, India		25
8	20 April 1975	Launch of First Indian Satellite		25
*		Indian birds, (Set of 4 Stamps)		
9	28 April 1975	Indian Pitta		25
10	28 April 1975	Black headed Oriole		50
11	28 April 1975	Western Tragopan		100
12	28 April 1975	Monal Pheasant		200
13	24 May 1975	4th Centenary of Ramcharitmanas (epic poem by Tulsidas)		25
14	20 June 1975	Centenary of Indian Young Women's Christian Association (YWCA)		25
15	28 June 1975	500th Birth Anniversary of Michelangelo Buonarroti (Se-tenant of Four)		50 (Each)
16	28 July 1975	25th Anniversary of International Commission on Irrigation and Drainage		25
17	1 August 1975	Satellite Instructional Television Experiment		25
18	14 August 1975	600th Birth Anniversary of Sant Arunagirinathar		50
19	26 August 1975	Namibia Day		25
20	4 September 1975	Mir Anees		25
21	4 September 1975	Ahilyabai Holkar		25
*		Indian classical dances, (Set of 6 Stamps)		
22	20 October 1975	Bharata Natyam		25
23	20 October 1975	Odissi		50
24	20 October 1975	Kathak		75
25	20 October 1975	Kathakali		100
26	20 October 1975	Kuchipudi		150
27	20 October 1975	Manipuri		200
*		Personality Series (Set of 3 Stamps)		
28	24 October 1975	Vengalil Krishnan Krishna Menon		25
29	24 October 1975	Ameer Khusrau		50
30	24 October 1975	Bahadur Shah Zafar		100
31	28 October 1975	21st Commonwealth Parliamentary Conference, New Delhi		200
32	31 October 1975	Birth Centenary of Sardar Vallabhbhai Patel		25
33	3 November 1975	Birth Centenary of Karmavir Nabin Chandra Bardoloi		25
34	14 November 1975	National Children's Day		25
35	13 December 1975	50th Anniversary of India Security Press, Nasik		20
36	16 December 1975	Tercentenary of the martyrdom of Guru Tegh Bahadur		25
37	20 December 1975	Centenary of the Theosophical Society		25
38	24 December 1975	Centenary of the Indian Meteorological Department		25
*		INPEX-75 India National Philatelic Exhibition, Calcutta (Set of 2 Stamps)		
39	25 December 1975	Early Mail Cart		25
40	25 December 1975	Indian Bishop Mark (1775 A.D.)		200

== 1976 ==
#	Issue date	Description	Image	Denomination
1	3 January 1976	First Death Anniversary of Lalit Narayan Mishra		25
2	24 January 1976	Birth Centenary of Jim Corbett		25
3	10 February 1976	Keoladeo Ghana Bird Sanctuary, Bharatpur		25
4	4 March 1976	Bicentenary of 16th Light Cavalry Regiment		25
5	10 March 1976	Alexander Graham Bell		25
6	18 March 1976	Birth Centenary of Muthuswami Dikshitar		20
7	7 April 1976	World Health Day. Prevention of Blindness		25
8	30 April 1976	Industrial Development		25
*		Indian Locomotives, (Set of 4 Stamps)		
9	15 May 1976	W.D.M 2 1963		25
10	15 May 1976	F/1 1895		50
11	15 May 1976	WP/1 1963		100
12	15 May 1976	GIP NO. 1 1853		200
13	29 May 1976	Bicentenary of American Revolution		280
14	15 July 1976	73rd Birth Anniversary of K. Kamaraj		25
*		XXI Olympic Games, Montreal, (Set of 4 Stamps)		
15	17 July 1976	Shooting		25
16	17 July 1976	Shot Put		100
17	17 July 1976	Hockey		150
18	17 July 1976	Running		280
19	6 August 1976	Subhadra Kumari Chauhan		25
20	15 August 1976	Param Vir Chakra (Highest Gallantry Award)		25
21	3 September 1976	60th Anniversary of Shreemati Nathibai Damodar Thackersey Women's University, Bombay		25
22	9 September 1976	Bharatendu Harishchandra		25
23	15 September 1976	Birth Centenary of Sarat Chandra Chatterjee		25
24	22 September 1976	Family Planning Campaign		25
25	24 September 1976	Maharaja Agrasen		75
*		Indian wild life, (Set of 4 Stamps)		
26	1 October 1976	swamp deer		25
27	1 October 1976	Indian lion		50
28	1 October 1976	Leopard		100
29	1 October 1976	caracal		200
30	1 October 1976	Voluntary Blood Donation		25
31	15 October 1976	Suryakant Tripathi 'Nirala'		25
32	14 November 1976	National Children's Day		25
33	24 November 1976	Hiralal Shastri		25
34	26 November 1976	Dr.Hari Singh Gour		25
35	1 December 1976	Inauguration of Indian Airlines Airbus Service		200
36	27 December 1976	Diamond Jubilee of Coconut Research		20
37	30 December 1976	Centenary of 'Vande Mataram'		25

== 1977 ==
#	Issue date	Description	Image	Denomination
1	3 January 1977	Sixth International Film Festival of India, New Delhi		200
2	10 January 1977	Sixth World Conference of Earthquake Engineering, New Delhi		25
3	22 January 1977	Birth Centenary of Tarun Ram Phookun		25
4	7 March 1977	Paramahansa Yogananda		25
5	9 March 1977	First Asian Regional Red Cross Conference, New Delhi		200
6	22 March 1977	Death of Fakhruddin Ali Ahmed		25
7	1 April 1977	15th Anniversary of Asian Oceanic Postal Union		200
8	2 April 1977	Birth Centenary of Narottam Morarjee		25
9	4 April 1977	Makhanlal Chaturvedi		25
10	14 April 1977	Vallabhacharya		100
11	23 April 1977	50th Anniversary of Federation of Indian Chamber of Commerce and Industry		25
12	5 June 1977	5th World Environment Day		200
13	21 June 1977	25th Anniversary of Rajya Sabha (Upper House of Parliament)		25
*		Indian flowers, (Set of 4 Stamps)		
14	1 July 1977	Lotus		25
15	1 July 1977	Rhododendron		50
16	1 July 1977	Kadamba		100
17	1 July 1977	Gloriosa lily		200
18	20 July 1977	Centenary of Sound Recording		200
19	22 August 1977	Birth Centenary of Ananda Kentish Coomaraswamy		25
20	4 September 1977	50th Death Anniversary of Ganga Ram		25
21	6 October 1977	32nd International Homeopathic Congress		200
22	12 October 1977	Ram Manohar Lohia		25
*		'INPEX-77', 3rd National Philatelic Exhibition, Bangalore. (Set of 2 Stamps)		
23	12 October 1977	Early Postman		25
24	12 October 1977	Lion and Palm Tree		200
*		'ASIANA-77', First Asian International Philatelic Exhibition, Bangalore. (Set of 2 Stamps)		
25	19 October 1977	First in Asia 1852		100
26	19 October 1977	Foreign Mail Bombay 1927		300
27	23 October 1977	15th International Congress of Pediatrics, New Delhi		200
28	23 October 1977	Kittur Rani Channamma		25
29	8 November 1977	Union Public Service Commission		25
30	13 November 1977	'AGRIEXPO-77', Agriculture Exposition, New Delhi		25
*		National Children's Day, (Set of 2 Stamps)		
31	14 November 1977	Cats		25
32	14 November 1977	Friends		100
33	28 November 1977	Jotirao Phooley		25
34	28 November 1977	Senapati Bapat		25
35	13 December 1977	41st Session of International Statistical Institute, New Delhi		200
36	25 December 1977	Kamta Prasad Guru		25
37	30 December 1977	60th Year of Great October Socialist Revolution 1917 USSR		100

== 1978 ==
#	Issue date	Description	Image	Denomination
*		Conquest of Kanchenjunga, (Set of 2 Stamps)		
1	15 January 1978	Climbing With Ice Ladder		200
2	15 January 1978	Kanchenjunga Peak		100
3	23 January 1978	27th Pacific Area Travel Association Conference, New Delhi		100
4	11 February 1978	III World Book Fair, New Delhi		25
5	21 February 1978	Birth Centenary of The Mother, Puducherry		25
6	23 February 1978	Fifth International Wheat Genetics Symposium, New Delhi		25
7	16 March 1978	Nanalal Dalpatram Kavi		25
8	22 March 1978	Surjya Sen		25
*		Modern Indian paintings, (Set of 4 Stamps)		
9	23 March 1978	Jamini Roy		25
10	23 March 1978	Sailoz Mookherjea		50
11	23 March 1978	Rabindranath Tagore		100
12	23 March 1978	Amrita Shergil		200
13	14 April 1978	400th Birth Anniversary of Peter Paul Rubens		200
14	16 April 1978	Charles Spencer Chaplin		25
15	5 May 1978	Deendayal Upadhyaya		25
16	6 July 1978	Shyama Prasad Mookerjee		25
*		Museums of India, (Set of 4 Stamps)		
17	27 July 1978	Kachchh Museum		25
18	27 July 1978	Indian Museum		50
19	27 July 1978	National Museum		100
20	27 July 1978	Salar Jung Museum		25
21	25 August 1978	Bhagawadgeeta		25
22	4 September 1978	Centenary of Bethune College		25
23	17 September 1978	E.V.Ramasami		25
24	26 September 1978	Uday Shankar Chowdhury		200
25	2 October 1978	150th Birth Anniversary of Leo Tolstoy		100
26	15 October 1978	Birth Centenary of Vallathol Narayana Menon		25
27	14 November 1978	National Children's Day		25
28	17 November 1978	National Small Industries Fair, New Delhi		25
29	25 November 1978	175th Anniversary of Skinner's Horse (Cavalry regiment)		25
30	10 December 1978	Birth Centenary of Mohammad Ali Jauhar		25
31	10 December 1978	Birth Centenary of Chakravarti Rajagopalachari		25
32	23 December 1978	75th Anniversary of Powered Flight		100
33	24 December 1978	Centenary of Ravenshaw College, Cuttack		25
34	25 December 1978	Death Anniversary of Franz Peter Schubert		100

== 1979 ==
#	Issue date	Description	Image	Denomination
1	20 February 1978	4th Reunion of Punjab Regiment		25
2	24 February 1979	Bhai Parmanand		25
*		International Year of the Child, (Set of 2 Stamps)		
3	5 March 1979	Child and Gandhi		25
4	5 March 1979	Indian Symbol of I.Y.C.		100
5	14 March 1979	Albert Einstein – Birth Centenary		100
6	1 May 1979	Rajarshi Shahu Chhatrapati		25
7	12 July 1979	India 80 – Stamp Exhibition		30
8	12 July 1979	Postcards – Centenary		50
9	15 August 1979	Raja Mahendra Pratap		30
10	13 September 1979	Jatindra Nath Das – 50th Death Anniversary		30
*		India 80 – Airmails, (Set of 4 Stamps)		
11	15 October 1979	Puss Moth Aircraft		30
12	15 October 1979	Airforce Helicopter		50
13	15 October 1979	Indian Airlines (Boeing 737)		100
14	15 October 1979	Air India (Boeing 747)		200
15	21 October 1979	Electric Lightbulb – Centenary		30
16	23 October 1979	International Archives Week		30
17	29 October 1979	International Commission on Large Dams – 50th Anniversary (Hirakud Dam)		30
18	10 November 1979	International Children's Book Fair		30
19	10 November 1979	International Trade Fair		100
20	4 December 1979	23rd International Atomic Energy Agency Conference		100
21	10 December 1979	Flying and Gliding		25
22	21 December 1979	Guru Amar Das – 500th Birth Anniversary		30

== 1980 ==
#	Issue date	Description	Image	Denomination
1	21 January 1980	UNIDO 3rd General Conference, New Delhi		30
*		'India 80', International Stamp Exhibition, New Delhi, (Set of 4 Stamps)		
2	25 January 1980	Army Post Office		30
3	25 January 1980	Money Order		50
4	25 January 1980	Copper Ticket		100
5	25 January 1980	Rowland Hill		200
6	17 February 1980	Institution of Engineers (India)		30
7	26 February 1980	Madras Sappers		30
8	29 February 1980	4th World Book Fair, New Delhi		30
9	29 February 1980	2nd International Conference on Apiculture, New Delhi		100
10	18 March 1980	Welthy Fisher		30
11	21 March 1980	Darul Uloom, Deoband		30
12	15 April 1980	Keshub Chandra Sen		30
13	21 April 1980	Chatrapati Shivaji		30
14	9 May 1980	5th Asian Table Tennis Championships, Calcutta		30
15	5 June 1980	N. M. Joshi		30
16	6 June 1980	Ulloor S. Parameswara Iyer		30
17	25 June 1980	S. M. Zamin Ali		30
18	27 June 1980	Helen Keller		30
*		XXII Olympic Games, Moscow (Set of 2 Stamps)		
19	19 July 1980	High Jump		100
20	19 July 1980	Show Jumping		280
21	31 July 1980	Prem Chand		30
22	27 August 1980	Nobel Peace Prize, 1979 – Mother Teresa		30
23	28 August 1980	Mountbatten		280
24	27 September 1980	Scottish Church College, Calcutta		35
25	30 September 1980	Rajah Annamalai Chettiar		35
*		Dandi March (Se-tenant)		
26	2 October 1980	Dandi March		35
27	2 October 1980	Salt Satyagraha		35
28	8 October 1980	Jayaprakash Narayan		35
29	1 November 1980	Great Indian bustard		230
30	3 November 1980	1400 Hijri		35
31	14 November 1980	Children's Day		35
32	3 December 1980	Dhyan Chand		35
33	20 December 1980	Gold Mining (Centenary of Kolar Gold Fields)		100
34	25 December 1980	M. A. Ansari		35
35	27 December 1980	India Government Mint, Bombay		35
*		Brides of India (Set of 4 Stamps)		
36	30 December 1980	Bride – Tamil Nadu		100
37	30 December 1980	Bride – Rajasthan		100
38	30 December 1980	Bride – Kashmir		100
39	30 December 1980	Bride – Bengal		100
