= List of postage stamps of India (1951–1960) =

This is a list of commemorative postage stamps issued by the India Post between 1951 and 1960.

== 1951 ==
#	Issue date	Description	Image	Denomination
1	13 January 1951	Centenary of Geological Survey of India		2 anna
*		1st Asian Games (Set of 2 Stamps)		
2	4 March 1951	Torch in Front of Map Asia		2 anna
3	4 March 1951	Torch in Front of Map Asia		12 anna

== 1952 ==
#	Issue date	Description	Image	Denomination
*		Saints and Poets (Set of 6 Stamps)		
1	1 October 1952	Kabir		9 pies
2	1 October 1952	Tulasidas		1 anna
3	1 October 1952	Meera		2 anna
4	1 October 1952	Surdas		4 anna
5	1 October 1952	Ghalib		4½ anna
6	1 October 1952	Tagore		12 anna

== 1953 ==
#	Issue date	Description	Image	Denomination
1	16 April 1953	Centenary of Indian Railways		2 anna
*		Conquest of Mount Everest (Set of 2 Stamps)		
2	2 October 1953	Mount Everest		2 anna
3	2 October 1953	Mount Everest		14 anna
*		Centenary of Indian Telegraphs (Set of 2 Stamps)		
4	1 November 1953	Telegraph Poles of 1851 and 1951		2 anna
5	1 November 1953	Telegraph Poles of 1851 and 1951		12 anna

== 1954 ==
#	Issue date	Description	Image	Denomination
*		Centenary of Indian Postage Stamps (set of 4 Stamps)		
1	1 October 1954	Mail Transport, 1854 (Runner, Camel and Bullock Cart)		1 anna
2	1 October 1954	Courier Pigeon and Plane		2 anna
3	1 October 1954	Mail Transport, 1954 (Cycle, Train, Ship and Plane)		4 anna
4	1 October 1954	Courier Pigeon and Plane		14 anna
5	24 October 1954	United Nations Day		2 anna
6	11 December 1954	4th World Forestry Congress		2 anna

== 1956 ==
#	Issue date	Description	Image	Denomination
*		Buddha Jayanti (Set of 2 Stamps)		
1	24 May 1956	2500th Buddha Jayanti		2 anna
2	24 May 1956	2500th Buddha Jayanti		14 anna
3	23 July 1956	Birth Centenary of Lokmanya Bal Gangadhar Tilak		2 anna

== 1957 ==
#	Issue date	Description	Image	Denomination
*		Centenary of First Freedom Struggle (Set of 2 Stamps)		
1	15 August 1957	Rani Laxmibai		15 np
2	15 August 1957	Sapling and leaping flames		90 np
3	28 October 1957	19th International Red Cross Conference, New Delhi		15 np
*		Children's Day (Set of 3 Stamps)		
4	14 November 1957	Nutrition		8 np
5	14 November 1957	Education		15 np
6	14 November 1957	Recreation		90 np
*		Centenary of Indian Universities (Set of 3 Stamps)		
7	31 December 1957	University of Bombay		10 np
8	31 December 1957	University of Calcutta		10 np
9	31 December 1957	University of Madras		10 np

== 1958 ==
#	Issue date	Description	Image	Denomination
1	1 March 1958	50th Anniversary of first indigenous Steel Industry		15 np
2	18 April 1958	Birth Centenary of Dr.Dhondo Keshav Karve		15 np
*		Indian Air Force : Silver Jubilee (Set of 2 Stamps)		
3	30 April 1958	Indian Air Force : Silver Jubilee		15 np
4	30 April 1958	Indian Air Force : Silver Jubilee		90 np
5	7 November 1958	Birth Centenary of Bipin Chandra Pal		15 np
6	14 November 1958	Children's Day		15 np
7	30 November 1958	Birth Centenary of Sir Jagadish Chandra Bose		15 np
8	30 December 1958	India-1958 Exhibition, New Delhi		15 np

== 1959 ==
#	Issue date	Description	Image	Denomination
1	15 April 1959	Death Centenary of Sir Jamsetjee Jejeebhoy		15 np
2	15 June 1959	40th Anniversary of International Labour Organization (I.L.O.)		15 np
3	14 November 1959	National Children's Day		15 np
4	30 December 1959	First World Agriculture Fair, New Delhi		15 np

== 1960 ==
#	Issue date	Description	Image	Denomination
1	15 February 1960	Thiruvalluvar		15 np
*		Kālidāsa (Set of 2 Stamps)		
2	22 June 1960	Yaksha in 'Meghaduta'		15 np
3	22 June 1960	Shakuntala		1.03 Rs
4	11 September 1960	Subramania Bharati		15 np
5	15 September 1960	Birth Centenary of Dr. Mokshagundam Visvesvaraya		15 np
6	14 November 1960	National Children's Day		15 np
7	11 December 1960	UNICEF Day		15 np
