= List of miniature sheets from India Post =

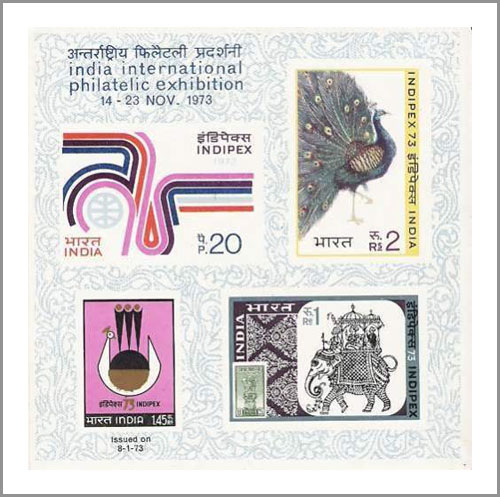
1973 Miniature sheet (International Philatelic Exhibition)

A Miniature sheet is a small group of stamps that are still attached to the sheet on which they are printed. They could be regular issues or commemorative ones as well. They could be individual designs as well with special illustrations on the sheet. Several miniature sheets have been issued by India which portrays different aspects of the nation's identity like famous personalities, important events, art and culture, history, monuments etc.

India Post issued its first miniature sheet on 14 November 1973.

== List of miniature sheets ==
India Post miniature sheets
Sr. No.	Description	Denomination	Issue date	Ref.
1	Indipex 73 India International Philatelic Exhibition, New Delhi.	₹ 4.65	14 Nov 1973	
2	Indian Masks Series	₹ 3.70	15 Apr 1974	
3	Centenary of Universal Postal Union	₹ 3.25	3 Oct 1974	
4	World Philatelic Exhibition - New Delhi (1st issue)	₹ 8.00	15 Jun 1987	
5	World Philatelic Exhibition - New Delhi	₹ 15.00	17 Oct 1987	
6	India-South Africa Cooperation : Mahatma Gandhi.	₹ 8.00	2 Oct 1995	
7	Himalayan Ecology	₹ 30.00	10 May 1996	
8	INDEPEX 1997, International Stamp Exhibition, New Delhi. Mother Teresa.	₹ 45.00	15 Dec 1997	
9	Explore India Millennium Year. Indepex Asiana 2000, 14th Asian International Stamp Exhibition, Calcutta (1st Issue).	₹ 24.00	31 Mar 2000	
10	Indepex Asiana 2000 Calcutta 07- 12 December 2000	₹ 12.00	24 May 2000	
11	Indepex Asiana 2000, 14th Asian International Stamp Exhibition, Calcutta : Gems and Jewellery.	₹ 15.00	7 Dec 2000	
12	150 Years of Railways in India	₹ 15.00	16 Apr 2002	
13	50th Anniversary of Diplomatic Relations between India and Japan	₹ 30.00	26 Apr 2002	
14	8th Session of the Conference of the Parties to the United Nations Framework Convention on Climate Change, New Delhi : Mangroves	₹ 30.00	30 Oct 2002	
15	Handicrafts of India.	₹ 20.00	15 Nov 2002	
16	Aero India 2003, Bangalore, on Centenary Year of Man's First Flight.	₹ 30.00	5 Feb 2003	
17	Medicinal Plant of India	₹ 20.00	7 Apr 2003	
18	Golden Voices of Yesteryears	₹ 20.00	15 May 2003	
19	Golden Jubilee of the Ascent of Mount Everest by Tenzing Norgay and Edmund Hillary.	₹ 15.00	29 May 2003	
20	151st Anniversary of Government Museum, Chennai	₹ 25.00	19 Jun 2003	
21	Waterfalls of India	₹ 30.00	3 Oct 2003	
22	Nature India - Snakes : Python, Pit Viper, King Cobra, Gliding Snake.	₹ 20.00	12 Nov 2003	
23	India-France Joint Issue	₹ 44.00	29 Nov 2003	
24	Golden Jubilee of Sangeet Natak Akademi	₹ 15.00	22 Dec 2003	
25	INS Tarangini Circumnavigation Voyage	₹ 5.00	25 Apr 2004	
26	The Great Trigonometric Survey	₹ 15.00	28 Jun 2004	
27	150 Years of India Post (Postage Stamp)	₹ 20.00	4 Oct 2004	
28	Indian Army in US Peace Keeping Operations	₹ 5.00	24 Oct 2004	
29	The Aga Khan Award for Architecture, ninth Cycle 2002-2004: Agra Fort	₹ 30.00	28 Nov 2004	
30	Taj Mahal, Agra	₹ 15.00	16 Dec 2004	
31	Flora and Fauna of North East India.	₹ 20.00	24 Mar 2005	
32	75th Anniversary of 'Dandi March' (Salt Movement)	₹ 20.00	6 Apr 2005	
33	150 Years of India Post : Letter Boxes	₹ 20.00	18 Oct 2005	
34	India-Cyprus : Joint Issue (Folk Dances)	₹ 30.00	12 Apr 2006	
35	'Save Kurinji' Campaign.	₹ 15.00	29 May 2006	
36	India - Mongolia : Joint Issue (Arts and Crafts)	₹ 30.00	11 Sep 2006	
37	Endangered Birds of India.	₹ 20.00	5 Oct 2006	
38	National Children's Day.	₹ 10.00	14 Nov 2006	
39	Sandalwood	₹ 15.00	13 Dec 2006	
40	Fragrances of Roses.	₹ 40.00	7 Feb 2007	
41	Fairs of India	₹ 20.00	27 Feb 2007	
42	International Women's Day	₹ 40.00	8 Mar 2007	
43	2550 Years of 'Mahaparivirvana' of the Buddha	₹ 30.00	2 May 2007	
44	150 Years of First War of Independence.	₹ 20.00	9 Aug 2007	
45	Landmark Bridges of India	₹ 20.00	2 May 2007	
46	Centenary of 'Satyagraha'. The Stirrings.	₹ 20.00	2 Oct 2007	
47	Platinum Jubilee of Indian Air Force	₹ 30.00	8 Oct 2007	
48	4th CISM (International Military Sports Council) Military World Games, Hyderabad & Mumbai	₹ 15.00	14 Oct 2007	
49	Children's Day	₹ 10.00	14 Nov 2007	
50	Renewable Energy.	₹ 20.00	22 Nov 2007	
51	Endemic Butterflies of Andaman and Nicobar Islands.	₹ 20.00	2 Jan 2008	
52	75th Birth Anniversary of Madhubala Mumtaz Begum Jahan Dehlavi (Film Actress)	₹ 5.00	18 Mar 2008	
53	Jasmine.	₹ 20.00	26 Apr 2008	
54	30th Anniversary of Aga Khan	₹ 20.00	17 May 2008	
55	India - China : Joint Issue, Buddhist Temples.	₹ 30.00	11 Jul 2008	
56	XXIX Olympic Games, Beijing, China	₹ 40.00	8 Aug 2008	
57	30th Anniversary of Indian Coast Guard.	₹ 20.00	12 Aug 2008	
58	Festivals of India. Durga Puja, Dussehra and Deepavali	₹ 15.00	7 Oct 2008	
59	Third Commonwealth Youth Games, Belewadi, Pune	₹ 20.00	12 Oct 2008	
60	Post Office (Rabindranath Tagore's 'DAKGHAR')	₹ 15.00	13 Oct 2008	
61	19th Commonwealth Games. New Delhi (2010)	₹ 15.00	18 Oct 2008	
62	National Children's Day. "India of My Dreams"	₹ 15.00	14 Nov 2008	
63	Canonisation of St. Alphonsa Muttathupadathu	₹ 15.00	16 Nov 2008	
64	60th Anniversary of Sardar Vallabhbhai Patel National Police Academy, Hyderabad	₹ 15.00	27 Nov 2008	
65	Centenary of the Indian Institute of Science, Bangalore	₹ 25.00	14 Dec 2008	
66	10th Anniversary of BRAHMOS Supersonic Cruise Missile	₹ 25.00	22 Dec 2008	
67	Heritage Monuments Preservation by INTACH : Jaisalmer Fort, Mangya Monastery, St. Annie's Church & Qila Mubarak.	₹ 20.00	28 Jan 2009	
68	Spices of India	₹ 20.00	29 Apr 2009	
69	Rampur Raja Library, Uttar Pradesh	₹ 20.00	19 Jun 2009	
70	Jayadeva (Poet) and Geetagovinda (Sanskrit Verse)	₹ 55.00	27 Jul 2009	
71	Heritage Railway Stations of India	₹ 20.00	16 Aug 2009	
72	Rare Fauna of North East India	₹ 15.00	1 Oct 2009	
73	Horses of India	₹ 20.00	9 Nov 2009	
74	The Silent Valley	₹ 5.00	15 Nov 2009	
75	India-Philippines Joint Issue, Butanding and Gangetic Dolphin	₹ 25.00	16 Nov 2009	
76	Greetings	₹ 20.00	1 Dec 2009	
77	Traditional Indian Textiles	₹ 20.00	10 Dec 2009	
78	Preserve the Polar Regions and Glaciers	₹ 10.00	19 Dec 2009	
79	Astrological Signs	₹ 60.00	14 Apr 2010	
80	Postal Heritage Buildings	₹ 30.00	13 May 2010	
81	International Year of biodiversity	₹ 25.00	5 Jun 2010	
82	Queen's Baton Relay XIX Commonwealth Games.	₹ 25.00	25 Jun 2010	
83	Birds of India	₹ 10.00	9 Jul 2010	
84	Rath Yatra of Puri.	₹ 5.00	9 Jul 2010	
85	Commonwealth Games (2nd Series).Talkatora Stadium and Jawaharlal Nehru Stadium.	₹ 10.00	9 Jul 2010	
86	XIX Commonwealth Games, Delhi 2010	₹ 20.00	3 Oct 2010	
87	Indian Postage Stamps - Princely States	₹ 20.00	6 Oct 2010	
88	Children's Day	₹ 20.00	14 Nov 2010	
89	India-Mexico: Joint Issue	₹ 25.00	15 Dec 2010	
90	Crafts Museum	₹ 10.00	21 Dec 2010	
91	Krishnadevraya	₹ 5.00	27 Jan 2011	
92	Mahatma Gandhi Khadi Stamp	₹ 100.00	12 Feb 2011	
93	100 Years of Airmail	₹ 20.00	12 Feb 2011	
94	Legendary Heroines of India	₹ 30.00	13 Feb 2011	
95	150 Years of Rabindranath Tagore	₹ 10.00	7 May 2011	
96	2nd Africa-India Forum Summit 2011	₹ 30.00	25 May 2011	
97	Rashtrapati Bhavan	₹ 20.00	5 Aug 2011	
98	Children's Day 2011 (Theme on Save Tiger)	₹ 25.00	14 Sep 2011	
99	Archaeological Survey of India	₹ 25.00	20 Dec 2011	
100	100 Years of Civil Aviation	₹ 35.00	14 Mar 2012	
101	"800th Urs of Khwaja Moinuddin Chishti Dargah Sharif, Ajmer"	₹ 25.00	27 Mar 2012	
102	London 2012 Olympic Games	₹ 50.00	25 Jul 2012	
103	Philately Day	₹ 20.00	12 Oct 2012	
104	XI Conference of Parties Convention on Biological Diversity, Hyderabad	₹ 40.00	16 Oct 2012	
105	Light Houses of India	₹ 25.00	23 Dec 2012	
106	Architectural Heritage	₹ 25.00	11 Apr 2013	
107	Heritage Buildings	₹ 10.00	12 Apr 2013	
108	100 Years of Indian Cinema (9 Stamps) 1/6 (Issued as a Sheetlet)	₹ 45.00	3 May 2013	
109	100 Years of Indian Cinema (9 Stamps) 2/6 (Issued as a Sheetlet)	₹ 45.00	3 May 2013	
110	100 Years of Indian Cinema (8 Stamps) 3/6 (Issued as a Sheetlet)	₹ 40.00	3 May 2013	
111	100 Years of Indian Cinema (9 Stamps) 4/6 (Issued as a Sheetlet)	₹ 40.00	3 May 2013	
112	100 Years of Indian Cinema (9 Stamps) 5/6 (Issued as a Sheetlet)	₹ 40.00	3 May 2013	
113	100 Years of Indian Cinema (9 Stamps) 6/6 (Issued as a Sheetlet)	₹ 40.00	3 May 2013	
114	Wild Ass	₹ 25.00	10 May 2013	
115	Wild Flowers (4 Stamps) 1/3	₹ 20.00	20 May 2013	
116	Wild Flowers (4 Stamps) 2/3	₹ 20.00	20 May 2013	
117	Wild Flowers (4 Stamps) 3/3	₹ 20.00	20 May 2013	
118	Wild Flowers (12 Stamps) (Issued as a Sheetlet)	₹ 60.00	20 May 2013	
119	Philately Day	₹ 20.00	12 Oct 2013	
120	Sachin Tendulkar	₹ 40.00	14 Nov 2013	
121	Railway Workshops	₹ 25.00	26 Nov 2013	
122	Emperor & Empress of Japan's Visit	₹ 20.00	5 Dec 2013	
123	Indian Museum, Kolkata	₹ 45.00	2 Feb 2014	
124	Fifa World Cup 2014	₹ 60.00	12 Jun 2014	
125	Indian Musicians	₹ 80.00	3 Sep 2014	
126	India - Slovenia Joint Issue	₹ 30.00	28 Nov 2014	
127	100 Years of Mahatma Gandhi's Return	₹ 30.00	8 Jan 2015	
128	Swachh Bharat	₹ 15.00	30 Jan 2015	
129	India - France: 50 Years of Space Co-operation	₹ 30.00	10 Apr 2015	
130	International Yoga Day	₹ 5.00	21 Jun 2015	
131	Women Empowerment	₹ 20.00	2 Sep 2015	
132	Charkha	₹ 10.00	15 Oct 2015	
133	3rd India - Africa Forum Summit	₹ 70.00	29 Oct 2015	
134	3rd India - Africa Forum Summit (Hot stamped with foil and embossed)	₹ 200.00	29 Oct 2015	
135	Children's Day	₹ 30.00	14 Nov 2015	
136	Zoological Survey of India (ZSI)	₹ 30.00	3 Dec 2015	
137	Vibrant India	₹ 25.00	25 Jan 2016	
138	UN Women He for She	₹ 30.00	8 Mar 2016	
139	Allahabad High Court	₹ 20.00	13 Mar 2016	
140	Surya Namaskar	₹ 180.00	20 Jun 2016	
141	Tadoba-Andhari National Park	₹ 30.00	29 Jul 2016	
142	2016 Olympic Games Rio	₹ 60.00	5 Aug 2016	
143	Orchids	₹ 90.00	8 Aug 2016	
144	Tourism in India	₹ 25.00	15 Aug 2016	
145	Indian Metal Crafts	₹ 90.00	26 Aug 2016	
146	Saint Teresa	₹ 50.00	4 Sep 2016	
147	Swachh Bharat	₹ 30.00	2 Oct 2016	
148	Birds - Series 1: Near Threatened	₹ 55.00	17 Oct 2016	
149	Children's Day - Picnic	₹ 30.00	14 Nov 2016	
150	Exotic Birds - 1	₹ 30.00	5 Dec 2016	
151	Exotic Birds - 2	₹ 30.00	5 Dec 2016	
152	Season's Greetings	₹ 30.00	23 Dec 2016	
153	Legendary singers	₹ 30.00	30 Dec 2016	
154	Splendours of India	₹ 300.00	1 Jan 2017	
155	Ganesh Pol, Amber Fort, Jaipur, Splendors of India	₹ 1000.00 (Sold in a calendar as a set of 12 sheets)	1 Jan 2017	
156	Pashmina Shawl, Kashmir, Splendours of India	₹ 1000.00 (Sold in a calendar as a set of 12 sheets)	1 Jan 2017	
157	Chhau Dance Mask, Splendours of India	₹ 1000.00 (Sold in a calendar as a set of 12 sheets)	1 Jan 2017	
158	Bodhi Tree, Sandstone Relief Sculpture, Sanchi, Splendours of India	₹ 1000.00 (Sold in a calendar as a set of 12 sheets)	1 Jan 2017	
159	Sarota, Areca Nut Cutter, Splendours of India	₹ 1000.00 (Sold in a calendar as a set of 12 sheets)	1 Jan 2017	
160	Peacock Gate, City Palace, Jaipur, Splendours of India	₹ 1000.00 (Sold in a calendar as a set of 12 sheets)	1 Jan 2017	
161	Chaitya Hall, Karle, Splendours of India	₹ 1000.00 (Sold in a calendar as a set of 12 sheets)	1 Jan 2017	
162	Thanjavur (Tanjore) Painting, Splendours of India	₹ 1000.00 (Sold in a calendar as a set of 12 sheets)	1 Jan 2017	
163	Blue Pottery, Jaipur, Splendours of India	₹ 1000.00 (Sold in a calendar as a set of 12 sheets)	1 Jan 2017	
164	Colored Glass Window, Bagore Ki Haveli, Udaipur, Splendours of India	₹ 1000.00 (Sold in a calendar as a set of 12 sheets)	1 Jan 2017	
165	Parchinkari, Pietra Dura, Splendours of India	₹ 1000.00 (Sold in a calendar as a set of 12 sheets)	1 Jan 2017	
166	Zardozi Carpet, Agra, Splendours of India	₹ 1000.00 (Sold in a calendar as a set of 12 sheets)	1 Jan 2017	
167	Guru Gobind Singh, 350th Prakash Utsav	₹ 10.00	5 Jan 2017	
168	India Portugal Joint Issue	₹ 30.00	7 Jan 2017	
169	Nature India	₹ 30.00	25 Jan 2017	
170	Headgears of India	₹ 160.00	10 Feb 2017	
171	Ladybird Beetle	₹ 40.00	23 Feb 2017	
172	Means of Transport in India	₹ 600.00 (Sold in a booklet as a set of 5 sheets)	25 Mar 2017	
173	Bullock & Horse Carriage, Means of Transport	₹ 600.00 (Sold in a booklet as a set of 5 sheets)	25 Mar 2017	
174	Rickshaw, Means of Transport	₹ 600.00 (Sold in a booklet as a set of 5 sheets)	25 Mar 2017	
175	Vintage Cars, Means of Transport	₹ 600.00 (Sold in a booklet as a set of 5 sheets)	25 Mar 2017	
176	Public Transport, Means of Transport	₹ 600.00 (Sold in a booklet as a set of 5 sheets)	25 Mar 2017	
177	Means of Transport	₹ 275.00	25 Mar 2017	
178	Bharat Ratna Bhim Rao Ambedkar Institute of Telecom Training, Jabalpur	₹ 15	22 April 2017	
179	Coffee	₹ 100	23 April 2017	
180	Champaran Satyagrah Century	₹ 40	13 May 2017	
181	Eminent Writers	₹ 50	31 May 2017	
182	Survey of India	₹ 20	22 Jun 2017	
183	Quit India	₹ 40	9 August 2017	
184	Beautiful India	₹ 30	15 August 2017	
185	Caves of Meghalaya	₹ 20	15 August 2017	
186	India-Belarus Joint issue	₹ 25	12 September 2017	
187	Vulnerable Birds	₹ 15	18 September 2017	
188	Diwali India Canada Joint issue	₹ 30	21 September 2017	
189	Ramayan-Two designs printed at Nasik and Hyderabad	₹ 65	22 September 2017	
190	Chhatrapati Shivaji International Airport	₹ 20	15 October 2017	
191	India-Russia joint issue	₹ 30	26 October 2017	
192	Indian Cuisine: Temple Prasad	₹ 30	3 November 2017	
193	Indian Cuisine: Festival	₹ 30	3 November 2017	
194	Indian Cuisine: Popular	₹ 30	3 November 2017	
195	Indian Cuisine: Regional	₹ 30	3 November 2017	
196	Indian Cuisine	₹ 120	3 November 2017	
197	Children's Day - Nest	₹ 15	10 November 2017	
198	Children's Day - Nest	₹ 15	10 November 2017	
199	Mahabharata	₹ 50	27 November 2017	
200	Mahabharata	₹ 100	27 November 2017	
201	Mahabharata	₹ 430	27 November 2017	
202	Step Wells	₹ 160	29 December 2017	
203	India-Papua New Guinea Joint Issue	₹ 30	30 December 2017	
204	Hand Fans	₹ 15	30 December 2017	
205	Hand Fans	₹ 15	30 December 2017	
206	Hand Fans	₹ 240	30 December 2017	
207	Coconut Research	₹ 20	8 January 2018	
208	India-Vietnam Joint Issue	₹ 30	25 January 2018	
209	India ASEAN Commemorative Summit	₹ 55	25 January 2018	
210	Potter's Wheel	₹ 15	26 January 2018	
211	India Iran Joint Issue	₹ 30	17 February 2018	
212	Solar System	₹ 40	20 March 2018	
213	Goan Tiatr	₹ 30	17 April 2018	
214	Prithviraj Chauhan	₹ 40	28 April 2018	
215	World Environment Day	₹ 20	5 June 2018	
216	India South Africa Joint Issue	₹ 30	7 June 2018	
217	India South Africa Joint Issue	₹ 30	26 July 2018	
218	Geographical Indication (GI) Registered Handloom Products	₹ 25	7 August 2018	
219	Holiday Destinations in India	₹ 30	15 August 2018	
220	India Armenia Joint Issue	₹ 30	29 August 2018	
221	India Serbia Joint Issue	₹ 30	15 September 2018	
222	Mahatma Gandhi 150th Birth Anniversary	₹ 150	2 October 2018	
223	Children's Day	₹ 30	14 November 2018	
224	Odisha Men's Hockey World Cup	₹ 25	28 November 2018	
225	National Police Memorial	₹ 25	22 December 2018	
226	Hill Forts of Rajasthan UNESCO World Heritage Sites	₹ 51	29 December 2018	
227	75th Anniversary of the First Flag Hoisting at Port Blair	₹ 75	30 December 2018	
228	Indian Fashion Series 1 Through the Ages	₹ 40	30 December 2018	
229	Geographical Indication Registered Handicraft Products	₹ 25	31 December 2018	
230	Central Institute of Plastics Engineering & Technology	₹ 41	24 January 2019	
231	AERO INDIA 2019	₹ 30	23 February 2019	
232	Jallianwala Bagh massacre	₹ 30	13 April 2019	
233	Patahare Prabhu Sari in Myriad from Indian Fashion Series 2	₹ 34	12 June 2019	
234	Ahimsa Parmo Dharma	₹ 30	17 June 2019	
235	India Korea Joint Issue	₹ 30	30 July 2019	
236	Indian Perfumes: Sandalwood (Scented Stamp)	₹ 50	1 August 2019	
237	Indian Perfumes: Jasmine (Scented Stamp)	₹ 50	1 August 2019	
238	Major Battle Theatres Indians in First World War	₹ 30	20 August 2019	
239	Air Warriors: Indians in First World War	₹ 40	20 August 2019	
240	Indian War Memorial : Indians in First World War	₹ 45	20 August 2019	
241	Maharaja Ganga Singh, Indian Signatory to the Treaty of Versailles Indians in First World War	₹ 25	20 August 2019	
242	Concept to Consumer Indian Fashion Series 3	₹ 50	6 September 2019	
243	Mahatma Gandhi, 150th Birth Anniversary	₹ 150	2 October 2019	
244	Indian Perfumes: Agarwood (Scented Stamp)	₹ 50	15 October 2019	
245	Indian Perfumes: Orange (Scented Stamp)	₹ 50	15 October 2019	
246	Historical Gates of Indian Forts and Monuments	₹ 50	19 October 2019	
247	Guru Nanak Dev Ji, 550th Birth Anniversary	₹ 55	9 November 2019	
248	Child Rights, Children's Day 2019	₹ 30	14 November 2019	
249	Embroideries Of India	₹ 175	19 December 2019	
250	Designers' Creations, Indian Fashion Series 4	₹ 45	14 January 2020	
251	Constitution of India	₹ 20	26 January 2020	
252	Natural Sites UNESCO World Heritage Sites in India II	₹ 46	16 March 2020	
253	Terracotta Temples	₹ 49	8 August 2020	
254	UNESCO World Heritage Sites in India III - Cultural Sites	₹ 25	15 August 2020	
255	Mahatma Gandhi	₹ 50	2 October 2020	
256	Covid-19 Warriors	₹ 40	24 December 2020	
257	Permanent Commission to Women Officers in Indian Army	₹ 50	15 January 2022	
258	India UAE Joint Issue	₹ 50	18 February 2022	
259	India Turkmenistan Joint Issue	₹ 50	3 April 2022	
260	National Flag	₹ 75	2 August 2022	
261	Sri Aurobindo	₹ 150	13 December 2022	
262	India-Egypt Diplomatic Relations - 75 years	₹ 30	25 January 2023	
263	Bridal Consumes-I	₹ 100	12 February 2023	
264	Bridal Consumes-II	₹ 100	12 February 2023	
265	Geographical Indiacations - Agriculatural Goods	₹ 60	12 February 2023	
266	India Luxembourg Joint Issue	₹ 50	14 February 2023	
267	Legends of Odisha	₹ 50	30 March 2023	
268	G20 Leaders' Sumit	₹ 40	26 July 2023	
269	India Vietnam Joint Issue	₹ 30	16 October 2023	
270	India-Mauritius Diplomatic Relations - 75 years	₹ 25	2 November 2023	
270	Shri Ram Janmbhoomi Temple	₹ 30 (Sold for ₹ 100 by department)	18 January 2024	
271	Bharat - The Mother of Democracy	₹ 15	25 January 2024	
272	Legendary Poets of Odisha	₹ 20	20 February 2024	
272	Cultural Heritage of Western Odisha	₹ 30	20 February 2024	
273	100th Birth Anniversary of Mukesh	₹ 30	24 July 2024	
274	XXXIII Olympics Paris 2024	₹ 20	5 August 2024	
275	Supreme Court of India – 75 Years	₹ 10	31 August 2024	
276	75 Years of Diplomatic Relations (India-Romania) (Joint Issue - Set of 2 Stamps)	₹ 50 each	17 September 2024	
277	150th anniversary of the Universal Postal Union (UPU) (Set of 3 Stamps)	₹ 15 each	9 October 2024	
278	75 Years of UNICEF with India	₹ 10	11 December 2024	
279	50 Years of NIMHANS	₹ 20	31 December 2024	
280	India - Israel Joint Issue	₹ 100	11 February 2025	
281	Maha Kumbh 2025	₹ 15	13-February 2025	
282	National School of Drama	₹ 20	16 February 2025	
283	50 Years of reestablishment of Diplomatic Relations between India and Portugal	₹ 100	7 April 2025	
284	Birth Centenary of Legends	₹ 25	1 May 2025	
285	60 Years of establishment of Diplomatic Relations Between India and Maldives	₹ 120	25 July 2025	
286	75th Anniversary of India-Philippines Diplomatic Relations	₹ 100	5 August 2025	
287	70th Anniversary of the establishment of diplomatic relations between India & Mongolia	₹ 100	14 October 2025	
288	Birth Centenary of Sri Sathya Sai Baba (Set of 4 stamps)	₹ 5.00 each	19 November 2025	
289	Medicinal plants of India (Set of 5 stamps)	₹ 5.00 each	19 December 2025	
290	100 years of Electrification in Indian Railways (Set of 2 stamps)	₹ 10 each	31 December 2025	
291	Puppets of India (Set of 8 stamps)	₹ 5 each	13 February 2026	
292	Women's College of Delhi (Set of 4)	₹ 5 each	25 March 2026	
293	India's Human Space Programme (AXIOM Mission) (Set of 2 Stamps)	₹ 20 each	12 April 2026	
294	Arunachal Pradesh Commemorative Postage Stamp Series (Set of 12 Stamps in 2 Miniature Sheet)	₹ 5 each	17 July 2026	

== Sources ==
- List of Miniature Sheets by Department of Post
- Stamps of India - Miniature Sheets
- PhilaIndia - Miniature Sheets
- The Indian Postage Stamps Homepage
- Indian Post Stamp Catalogue 1947 - 2011
- India Post Stamps Listing
