= List of postage stamps of India (2016–2020) =

This is a list of commemorative postage stamps issued by the India Post between 2016 and 2020.

== 2016 ==
| # | Issue date | Image | Description | Denomination |
|---|---|---|---|---|
| 1 | 24 January 2016 | | Income Tax Appellate Tribunal | 500p |
| 2 | 25 January 2016 | | Vibrant India | 2500p |
| 3 | 6 February 2016 | | International Fleet Review | 500p |
| 4 | 4 March 2016 | | Vasantrao Srinivassa Sinai Dempo | 500p |
| * | India-UN Women HeForShe (set of 2 Stamps) | | | |
| 5 | 8 March 2016 | | India-UN Women HeForShe | 500p |
| 5 | 8 March 2016 | | India-UN Women HeForShe | 2500p |
| 6 | 11 March 2016 | | National Archives of India | 500p |
| * | High Court (Set of 2 Stamps) | | | |
| 7 | 13 March 2016 | | Allahabad High Court | 1500p |
| 7 | 13 March 2016 | | Allahabad High Court | 500p |
| 8 | 14 April 2016 | | Fire Services of India | 500p |
| 9 | 27 April 2016 | | Govardhanram Tripathi | 500p |
| 10 | 21 May 2016 | | Swami Chidananda | 500p |
| 11 | 10 June 2016 | | Tata Power | 500p |
| * | Surya Namaskar (set of 12 Stamps) | | | |
| 12 | 20 June 2016 | | Pranamasana | 500p |
| 12 | 20 June 2016 | | Hasta Uttanasana | 500p |
| 12 | 20 June 2016 | | Padahastasana | 500p |
| 12 | 20 June 2016 | | Asbasanchalanasana | 500p |
| 12 | 20 June 2016 | | Parbatasana | 500p |
| 12 | 20 June 2016 | | Ashtanga Namaskara | 500p |
| 12 | 20 June 2016 | | Bhujangasana | 2500p |
| 12 | 20 June 2016 | | Paravatasana | 2500p |
| 12 | 20 June 2016 | | Aswasanchalasana | 2500p |
| 12 | 20 June 2016 | | Hastauttanasana | 2500p |
| 12 | 20 June 2016 | | Pranamasana | 2500p |
| 12 | 20 June 2016 | | Padahastasana | 2500p |
| 13 | 9 July 2016 | | Bombay Stock Exchange | 500p |
| * | Tadoba Andhari Tiger Reserve (set of 2 Stamps) | | | |
| 14 | 29 July 2016 | | Tadoba Andhari Tiger Reserve | 500p |
| 14 | 29 July 2016 | | Tadoba Andhari Tiger Reserve | 2500p |
| * | Games of the XXXI Olympiad - Rio (Set of 4 Stamps) | | | |
| 15 | 5 August 2016 | | Olympic Games Rio - Badminton | 5500p |
| 15 | 5 August 2016 | | Olympic Games Rio - Boxing | 5500p |
| 15 | 5 August 2016 | | Olympic Games Rio - Shooting | 2500p |
| 15 | 5 August 2016 | | Olympic Games Rio - Wrestling | 2500p |
| * | Orchids of India (Set of 6 Stamps) | | | |
| 16 | 8 August 2016 | | Esmeralda cathcartii | 500p |
| 16 | 8 August 2016 | | Paphiopedilum villosum | 500p |
| 16 | 8 August 2016 | | Dendrobium gibsonii | 1500p |
| 16 | 8 August 2016 | | Esmeralda clarkei | 1500p |
| 16 | 8 August 2016 | | Cypripedium himalaicum | 2500p |
| 16 | 8 August 2016 | | Dendrobium falconeri | 2500p |
| 17 | 15 August 2016 | | Tourism in India | 2500p |
| * | Indian Metal Crafts (set of 6 Stamps) | | | |
| 18 | 26 August 2016 | | Iron Surahi | 500p |
| 18 | 26 August 2016 | | Bronze Nataraja | 500p |
| 18 | 26 August 2016 | | Copper Pandan | 1500p |
| 18 | 26 August 2016 | | Brass-Incense Burner | 1500p |
| 18 | 26 August 2016 | | Spouted Lota | 2500p |
| 18 | 26 August 2016 | | Gajalakshmi Lamp | 2500p |
| 19 | 27 August 2016 | | Jagadguru Sri Shivarathri Rajendra Swamy | 500p |
| 20 | 4 September 2016 | | Saint Teresa | 5000p |
| 21 | 23 September 2016 | | Lady Hardinge Medical College | 500p |
| * | Indian Metal Crafts (set of 6 Stamps) | | | |
| 22 | 2 October 2016 | | Swachh Bharat | 500p |
| 22 | 2 October 2016 | | Swachh Bharat | 2500p |
| 23 | 4 October 2016 | | Central Water and Power Research Station | 500p |
| 24 | 6 October 2016 | | Induction of C-130 | 500p |
| * | Series 1: Near Threatened Birds (Set of 4 Stamps) | | | |
| 25 | 17 October 2016 | | Nicobar pigeon | 500p |
| 25 | 17 October 2016 | | Nilgiri flycatcher | 1000p |
| 25 | 17 October 2016 | | Andaman woodpecker | 1500p |
| 25 | 17 October 2016 | | Black-and-orange flycatcher | 2000p |
| 26 | 24 October 2016 | | Varanasi City | 500p |
| 27 | 31 October 2016 | | National Unity Day - Salute to The Unifier of India | 1000p |
| 28 | 1 November 2016 | | 50th Anniversary of Haryana | 500p |
| * | Children's Day (Set of 2 Stamps) | | | |
| 29 | 14 November 2016 | | Children's Day, Picnic | 1500p |
| 29 | 14 November 2016 | | Children's Day, Picnic | 1500p |
| 30 | 19 November 2016 | | Third Battalion - The Garhwal Rifles | 500p |
| 31 | 3 December 2016 | | All India Institutes of Medical Sciences | 500p |
| * | Exotic Birds (Set of 6) | | | |
| 32 | 5 December 2016 | | Exotic Birds - Blue-throated macaw | 500p |
| 32 | 5 December 2016 | | Exotic Birds - Cape parrot | 500p |
| 32 | 5 December 2016 | | Exotic Birds - Sun conure | 1000p |
| 32 | 5 December 2016 | | Exotic Birds - Hyacinth macaw | 1000p |
| 32 | 5 December 2016 | | Exotic Birds - Yellow-headed amazon | 1500p |
| 32 | 5 December 2016 | | Exotic Birds - Yellow-crested cockatoo | 1500p |
| 33 | 7 December 2016 | | Akshardham Temple, New Delhi and Pramukh Swami Maharaj | 500p |
| 33 | 7 December 2016 | | Akshardham Temple, New Delhi and Pramukh Swami Maharaj | 1500p |
| 34 | 14 December 2016 | | Acharya Vimal Sagar | 500p |
| 35 | 22 December 2016 | | Samrat Vikramaditya | 500p |
| 36 | 23 December 2016 | | Season's Greetings | 1000p |
| 36 | 23 December 2016 | | Season's Greetings | 2000p |
| * | Personality Series: Bihar (Set of 8 Stamps) | | | |
| 37 | 26 December 2016 | | Karpoori Thakur | 500p |
| 37 | 26 December 2016 | | Kunwar Singh | 500p |
| 37 | 26 December 2016 | | Kailashpati Mishra | 500p |
| 37 | 26 December 2016 | | Vidyapati | 500p |
| 37 | 26 December 2016 | | Sachchidananda Sinha | 500p |
| 37 | 26 December 2016 | | Dashrath Manjhi | 500p |
| 37 | 26 December 2016 | | Phanishwar Nath Renu | 500p |
| 37 | 26 December 2016 | | Shri Krishna Sinha | 500p |
| 38 | 26 December 2016 | | Deendayal Upadhyaya | 500p |
| 39 | 29 December 2016 | | Hardayal Municipal Heritage Public Library | 500p |
| * | Legendary Singers of India (Set of 10 Stamps) | | | |
| 40 | 30 December 2016 | | Mohammed Rafi | 500p |
| 40 | 30 December 2016 | | Kishore Kumar | 500p |
| 40 | 30 December 2016 | | Geeta Dutt | 500p |
| 40 | 30 December 2016 | | Manna Dey | 500p |
| 40 | 30 December 2016 | | Bhupen Hazarika | 500p |
| 40 | 30 December 2016 | | Talat Mahmood | 500p |
| 40 | 30 December 2016 | | T. M. Soundararajan | 500p |
| 40 | 30 December 2016 | | Mukesh | 500p |
| 40 | 30 December 2016 | | Shamshad Begum | 500p |
| 40 | 30 December 2016 | | Hemant Kumar | 500p |

== 2017 ==
| # | Issue date | Image | Description | Denomination |
|---|---|---|---|---|
| * | Happy New Year (Set of 12 Stamps) | | | |
| 1 | 1 January 2017 | | Ganesh Pol | 2500p |
| 1 | 1 January 2017 | | Pashmina | 2500p |
| 1 | 1 January 2017 | | Chhau mask | 2500p |
| 1 | 1 January 2017 | | Bodhi tree | 2500p |
| 1 | 1 January 2017 | | Sarota | 2500p |
| 1 | 1 January 2017 | | Peacock Gate | 2500p |
| 1 | 1 January 2017 | | Chaitanya Hall | 2500p |
| 1 | 1 January 2017 | | Thanjavur painting | 2500p |
| 1 | 1 January 2017 | | Blue Pottery | 2500p |
| 1 | 1 January 2017 | | Stained Glass | 2500p |
| 1 | 1 January 2017 | | Pietra dura | 2500p |
| 1 | 1 January 2017 | | Zardozi | 2500p |
| 2 | 5 January 2017 | | 350th Prakash Utsav: Guru Gobind Singh | 1000p |
| 3 | 7 January 2017 | | India-Portugal: Joint Issue Portugal - Pauliteros dance Miranda | 2500p |
| 3 | 7 January 2017 | | India-Portugal: Joint Issue Portugal - Dandiya Dance Gujarat | 500p |
| 4 | 17 January 2017 | | Dr. M. G. Ramachandran | 1500p |
| * | Nature: India (set of 6 Stamps) | | | |
| 5 | 25 January 2017 | | Butterfly | 500p |
| 5 | 25 January 2017 | | Tiger | 500p |
| 5 | 25 January 2017 | | Deer | 500p |
| 5 | 25 January 2017 | | Elephant | 500p |
| 5 | 25 January 2017 | | Peacock | 500p |
| 5 | 25 January 2017 | | Storks | 500p |
| 6 | 30 January 2017 | | India Post Payments Bank | 500p |
| * | Headgears of India (Set of 16 Stamps) | | | |
| 7 | 10 February 2017 | | Haryanvi Turban | 1000p |
| 7 | 10 February 2017 | | Hornbill Warrior Cap | 1000p |
| 7 | 10 February 2017 | | Gujarati Turban | 1000p |
| 7 | 10 February 2017 | | Bison Horn Cap | 1000p |
| 7 | 10 February 2017 | | Rajasthani Turban | 1000p |
| 7 | 10 February 2017 | | Himachali Cap | 1000p |
| 7 | 10 February 2017 | | Angami Trible Cap | 1000p |
| 7 | 10 February 2017 | | Japi Cap | 1000p |
| 7 | 10 February 2017 | | Puneri Turban | 1000p |
| 7 | 10 February 2017 | | Naga Hat | 1000p |
| 7 | 10 February 2017 | | Mysore Peta | 1000p |
| 7 | 10 February 2017 | | Sikh Turban | 1000p |
| 7 | 10 February 2017 | | Kashmiri Cap | 1000p |
| 7 | 10 February 2017 | | Mithila Turban | 1000p |
| 7 | 10 February 2017 | | Tepi Brokpa Tribe | 1000p |
| 7 | 10 February 2017 | | Gonda Ladakhi | 1000p |
| 8 | 11 February 2017 | | The Poona Horse | 500p |
| 9 | 13 February 2017 | | Ramjas College | 500p |
| * | Ladybird Beetles (Set of 4 Stamps) | | | |
| 10 | 23 February 2017 | | Coccinella septempunctata | 500p |
| 10 | 23 February 2017 | | Ladybird Beetles | 500p |
| 10 | 23 February 2017 | | Harmonia axyridis | 1500p |
| 10 | 23 February 2017 | | Psyllobora vigintiduopunctata | 1500p |
| 11 | 7 March 2017 | | Yogoda Satsanga Society of India | 500p |
| * | Means of Transport through the Ages (Set of 4X5=20 Stamps) | | | |
| 12 | 25 March 2017 | | Long Palanquin | 500p |
| 12 | 25 March 2017 | | Meena Palanquin | 1000p |
| 12 | 25 March 2017 | | Boutcha Palanquin | 1500p |
| 12 | 25 March 2017 | | Chowpal Palanquin | 2500p |
| 13 | 25 March 2017 | | Bullock Cart | 500p |
| 13 | 25 March 2017 | | Rath Bullock Cart | 1000p |
| 13 | 25 March 2017 | | Tonga | 1500p |
| 13 | 25 March 2017 | | Horse Carriage | 2500p |
| 14 | 25 March 2017 | | Cycle rickshaw | 500p |
| 14 | 25 March 2017 | | Motorcycle Rickshaw | 1000p |
| 14 | 25 March 2017 | | Hand Rickshaw | 1500p |
| 14 | 25 March 2017 | | School Rickshaw | 2500p |
| 15 | 25 March 2017 | | Rolls Royce | 500p |
| 15 | 25 March 2017 | | Austin | 1000p |
| 15 | 25 March 2017 | | Chevrolet | 1500p |
| 15 | 25 March 2017 | | Ford | 2500p |
| 16 | 25 March 2017 | | Tram | 500p |
| 16 | 25 March 2017 | | Delhi Metro | 1000p |
| 16 | 25 March 2017 | | Double Decker Bus | 1500p |
| 16 | 25 March 2017 | | Bus | 2500p |
| 17 | 30 March 2017 | | Cub Scouts | 500p |
| 18 | 14 April 2017 | | Deekshabhoomi | 500p each |
| 19 | 22 April 2017 | | Bharat Ratna Bhimrao Ambedkar Institute of Telecom Training, Jabalpur | 1500p |
| 20 | 23 April 2017 | | Coffee | 10000p |
| 21 | 26 April 2017 | | Atukuri Molla | 500p |
| 21 | 26 April 2017 | | Viswanatha Satyanarayana | 500p |
| 21 | 26 April 2017 | | Tarigonda Vengamamba | 500p |
| 22 | 1 May 2017 | | Ramanujacharya | 2500p |
| 23 | 5 May 2017 | | Telecom Regulatory Authority of India | 500p |
| * | Champaran Satyagraha Centenary (Set of 3 Stamps) | | | |
| 24 | 13 May 2017 | | Quote from Mohandas Gandhi | 500p |
| 24 | 13 May 2017 | | Champaran Satyagraha Centenary | 1000p |
| 24 | 13 May 2017 | | Champaran Indigo Farmers Satyagraha | 2500p |
| 25 | 19 May 2017 | | Shri Hanagal Kumaraswamiji | 500p |
| 26 | 31 May 2017 | | EMINENT WRITERS : Prof. Balwant Gargi | 1000p |
| 26 | 31 May 2017 | | EMINENT WRITERS : K.V. Puttappa | 1000p |
| 26 | 31 May 2017 | | EMINENT WRITERS : Pandit Shrilal Shukla | 1000p |
| 26 | 31 May 2017 | | EMINENT WRITERS : Bhisham Sahni | 1000p |
| 26 | 31 May 2017 | | EMINENT WRITERS : Krishan Chander | 1000p |
| 27 | 18 June 2017 | | Jhala Manna | 500p |
| 28 | 22 June 2017 | | Survey of India : Emblem of the Survey Of India | 500p |
| 28 | 22 June 2017 | | Survey of India : Surveyors Tools | 1500p |
| 29 | 23 June 2017 | | The Passports Act, 1967 | 2500p |
| 30 | 28 June 2017 | | Banaras Hindu University | 500p |
| 30 | 28 June 2017 | | Banaras Hindu University | 2000p |
| 31 | 29 June 2017 | | Shrimad Rajchandra | 500p |
| 32 | 9 August 2017 | | 1942 Freedom Movement | 500p |
| 32 | 9 August 2017 | | 1942 Freedom Movement | 500p |
| 32 | 9 August 2017 | | 1942 Freedom Movement | 500p |
| 32 | 9 August 2017 | | 1942 Freedom Movement | 500p |
| 32 | 9 August 2017 | | 1942 Freedom Movement | 500p |
| 32 | 9 August 2017 | | 1942 Freedom Movement | 500p |
| 32 | 9 August 2017 | | 1942 Freedom Movement | 500p |
| 32 | 9 August 2017 | | 1942 Freedom Movement | 500p |
| 33 | 15 August 2017 | | Beautiful India : Mountain Landscape | 1500p |
| 33 | 15 August 2017 | | Beautiful India : Flowered Tree | 1500p |
| * | Caves of Meghalaya | | | |
| 34 | 15 August 2017 | | Krem Blang Cave | 500p |
| 34 | 15 August 2017 | | Krem Khung Cave | 500p |
| 34 | 15 August 2017 | | Krem Syndai Cave | 500p |
| 34 | 15 August 2017 | | Krem Lymput Cave | 500p |
| 35 | 12 September 2017 | | India Belarus: Joint Issue | 2500p |
| * | Vulnerable Birds (Set of 3 stamps) | | | |
| 36 | 18 September 2017 | | Nilgiri Wood Pigeon Columba elphinstonii | 500p |
| 36 | 18 September 2017 | | Broad Tailed Grass Warbler Schoenicola platyurus | 500p |
| 36 | 18 September 2017 | | Nilgiri Pipit Anthus nilghiriensis | 500p |
| 37 | 21 September 2017 | | India Canada: Joint Issue on Diwali | 500p |
| 37 | 21 September 2017 | | India Canada: Joint Issue on Diwali | 2500p |
| 38 | 22 September 2017 | | Ramayana | 1500(p),500p(10) |
| 39 | 7 October 2017 | | Rapid Action Force | 500p |
| 40 | 11 October 2017 | | Nanaji Deshmukh | 500p |
| 41 | 15 October 2017 | | Chhatrapati Shivaji International Airport | 1500p |
| 41 | 15 October 2017 | | Chhatrapati Shivaji International Airport | 500p |
| 42 | 23 October 2017 | | 3 Kumaon (Rifles) | 500p |
| 43 | 26 October 2017 | | India Russia: Joint Issue (Bhavai, Beryozka) | 2500p,500p |
| 44 | 1 November 2017 | | Kavi Muddana | 500p |
| 44 | 1 November 2017 | | Adikavi Nannaya | 500p |
| 44 | 1 November 2017 | | Draksharamam Bhimeswara Temple | 500p |
| Indian cuisine (Set of 4X6=24 Stamps) | | | | |
| 45 | 3 November 2017 (Bhog Prasad) | | Modak | 500p |
| 45 | 3 November 2017 (Bhog Prasad) | | Mahaprasad - Rice Dal | 500p |
| 45 | 3 November 2017 (Bhog Prasad) | | Chhappan Bhog | 500p |
| 45 | 3 November 2017 (Bhog Prasad) | | Peda | 500p |
| 45 | 3 November 2017 (Bhog Prasad) | | Sandesh | 500p |
| 45 | 3 November 2017 (Bhog Prasad) | | Tirupati Laddu | 500p |
| 46 | 3 November 2017 (Festive Cuisine) | | Malpua | 500p |
| 46 | 3 November 2017 (Festive Cuisine) | | Pongal | 500p |
| 46 | 3 November 2017 (Festive Cuisine) | | Motichoor Laddu | 500p |
| 46 | 3 November 2017 (Festive Cuisine) | | Gujia | 500p |
| 46 | 3 November 2017 (Festive Cuisine) | | Seviyan | 500p |
| 46 | 3 November 2017 (Festive Cuisine) | | Thekua | 500p |
| 47 | 3 November 2017 (Popular Cuisine) | | Poha Jalebi | 500p |
| 47 | 3 November 2017 (Popular Cuisine) | | Golgappa | 500p |
| 47 | 3 November 2017 (Popular Cuisine) | | Dhokla | 500p |
| 47 | 3 November 2017 (Popular Cuisine) | | Chole Bhature | 500p |
| 47 | 3 November 2017 (Popular Cuisine) | | Idli & Dosa | 500p |
| 47 | 3 November 2017 (Popular Cuisine) | | Vada Pav | 500p |
| 48 | 3 November 2017 (Regional Cuisine) | | Baby Appam | 500p |
| 48 | 3 November 2017 (Regional Cuisine) | | Baghaar-e-baingan | 500p |
| 48 | 3 November 2017 (Regional Cuisine) | | Dal Bati | 500p |
| 48 | 3 November 2017 (Regional Cuisine) | | Litti Chokha | 500p |
| 48 | 3 November 2017 (Regional Cuisine) | | Sarson Ka Saag | 500p |
| 48 | 3 November 2017 (Regional Cuisine) | | Biryani | 500p |
| 49 | 14 November 2017 | | Nest: Children's Day 2017 | 1500p |
| 49 | 14 November 2017 | | Nest: Children's Day 2017 | 1500p |
| 50 | 27 November 2017 | | Mahabharata | 10000p,5000p, 2500p(4), 1500p(12), |
| 51 | 07 December 2017 | | INS Kalvari | 500p |
| 52 | 15 December 2017 | | Centenary of 'Mahasamadhi' of Shri Shirdi Sai Baba | 500p |
| 53 | 26 December 2017 | | Dr. Shambhunath Singh | 500p |
| 54 | 28 December 2017 | | Dr. Shivajirao Ganesh Patwardhan | 500p |
| 55 | 29 December 2017 | | Dadabhai Naoroji | 500p |
| * | Stepwells (Set of 16 stamps) | | | |
| 56 | 29 December 2017 | | Chand Baori | 1000p |
| 56 | 29 December 2017 | | Raniji ki Baori | 1000p |
| 56 | 29 December 2017 | | Toorji Ka Jhalra | 1000p |
| 56 | 29 December 2017 | | Panna Mian ki Baori | 1000p |
| 56 | 29 December 2017 | | Nagar Sagar Kund | 1000p |
| 56 | 29 December 2017 | | Neemrana | 1000p |
| 56 | 29 December 2017 | | Pushkarini stepwell | 1000p |
| 56 | 29 December 2017 | | Muskin Bhanvi Stepwell | 1000p |
| 56 | 29 December 2017 | | Rani Ki Vav | 1000p |
| 56 | 29 December 2017 | | Dada Harir Stepwell | 1000p |
| 56 | 29 December 2017 | | Shahi Baori | 1000p |
| 56 | 29 December 2017 | | Ghaus Ali Shah Baori | 1000p |
| 56 | 29 December 2017 | | Adalaj Stepwell | 1000p |
| 56 | 29 December 2017 | | Surya Kund | 1000p |
| 56 | 29 December 2017 | | Agrasen Ki Baoli | 1000p |
| 56 | 29 December 2017 | | Rajon Ki Baoli | 1000p |
| 57 | 30 December 2017 | | Peafowl: India Papua New Guinea: Joint Issue | 2500p |
| 57 | 30 December 2017 | | Raggiana bird-of-paradise: India Papua New Guinea: Joint Issue | 500p |
| 58 | 30 December 2017 | | Indian Handfans | 500p |
| 59 | 31 December 2017 | | Justice Mehr Chand Mahajan | 500p |

== 2018 ==
| # | Issue date | Image | Description | Denomination |
|---|---|---|---|---|
| 1 | 8 January 2018 | | ICAR: Central Plantation Crops Research Institute | 500 p |
| 1 | 8 January 2018 | | ICAR: Central Plantation Crops Research Institute | 1500 p |
| * | India - Viet Nam Joint Issue | | | |
| 2 | 25 January 2018 | | Phổ Minh Pagoda | 500 p |
| 2 | 25 January 2018 | | Sanchi Stupa | 2500 |
| * | ASEAN India Commemorative Summit 2018 (Set of 11 Stamps) | | | |
| 3 | 25 January 2018 | | Torana Gate, Malaysia | 500 p |
| 3 | 25 January 2018 | | Menyembah, Brunei | 500 p |
| 3 | 25 January 2018 | | Pattam Katha, India | 500 p |
| 3 | 25 January 2018 | | Ramayana - Darangen Philippines | 500 p |
| 3 | 25 January 2018 | | Phralak Phralam, Laos | 500 p |
| 3 | 25 January 2018 | | Ramayana Indonesia | 500 p |
| 3 | 25 January 2018 | | Yama Zatdaw, Myanmar | 500 p |
| 3 | 25 January 2018 | | Hanuman Khon Thailand | 500 p |
| 3 | 25 January 2018 | | Sri Maha Mariamman Temple, Thailand | 500 p |
| 3 | 25 January 2018 | | Kate Festival, Vietnam | 500 p |
| 3 | 25 January 2018 | | Kumbhakarna, Cambodia | 500 p |
| 4 | 26 January 2018 | | Potter's wheel | 500 p |
| 4 | 26 January 2018 | | Potter's wheel | 1500 p |
| 5 | 28 January 2018 | | Talimeren Ao | 500 p |
| * | Joint Issue of India and the Islamic Republic of Iran (Set of 2 Stamps) | | | |
| 6 | 17 February 2018 | | Chabahar Port | 500 p |
| 6 | 17 February 2018 | | Kandla Port | 2500 p |
| 7 | 23 February 2018 | | Nagi Reddi | 500 p |
| 8 | 25 February 2018 | | Auroville International Township- Golden Jubilee | 500 p |
| 9 | 5 March 2018 | | Biju Patnaik | 500 p |
| 10 | 8 March 2018 | | Central Industrial Security Force | 500 p |
| 10 | 8 March 2018 | | Central Industrial Security Force | 500 p |
| * | The Solar System (Set of 8 stamps) | | | |
| 11 | 20 March 2018 | | Mercury | 500 p |
| 11 | 20 March 2018 | | Venus | 500 p |
| 11 | 20 March 2018 | | Earth | 500 p |
| 11 | 20 March 2018 | | Mars | 500 p |
| 11 | 20 March 2018 | | Jupiter | 500 p |
| 11 | 20 March 2018 | | Saturn | 500 p |
| 11 | 20 March 2018 | | Uranus | 500 p |
| 11 | 20 March 2018 | | Neptune | 500 p |
| 12 | 11 April 2018 | | Defence Research and Development Organization | 1000 p |
| 13 | 17 April 2018 | | Goan Tiatr | 500 p |
| 13 | 17 April 2018 | | Goan Tiatr | 2500 p |
| 14 | 25 April 2018 | | Hemwati Nandan Bahuguna | 500 p |
| 15 | 27 April 2018 | | Safdarjung Hospital | 500 p |
| 15 | 27 April 2018 | | Safdarjung Hospital | 500 p |
| 16 | 29 April 2018 | | Prithviraj Chauhan | 500 p |
| 16 | 29 April 2018 | | Prithviraj Chauhan | 500 p |
| 16 | 29 April 2018 | | Prithviraj Chauhan | 1500 p |
| 16 | 29 April 2018 | | Prithviraj Chauhan | 1500 p |
| 17 | 15 May 2018 | | M. V. Arunachalam | 500 p |
| 18 | 23 May 2018 | | C. Kesavan | 500 p |
| 19 | 25 May 2018 | | The International Association of Lions Clubs | 1500 p |
| 20 | 5 June 2018 | | World Environment Day | 500 p |
| 20 | 5 June 2018 | | World Environment Day | 500 p |
| 20 | 5 June 2018 | | World Environment Day | 500 p |
| 20 | 5 June 2018 | | World Environment Day | 500 p |
| * | India-South Africa: Joint Issue | | | |
| 21 | 7 June 2018 | | Oliver Tambo | 500 p |
| 21 | 7 June 2018 | | Deendayal Upadhyaya | 2500 p |
| 22 | 17 June 2018 | | Dakshina Bharat Hindi Prachar Sabha, Madras | 500 p |
| 23 | 28 June 2018 | | Scott Christian College, Nagercoil | 500 p |
| 24 | 1 July 2018 | | The Institute of Chartered Accountants of India | 2200 p |
| 25 | 3 July 2018 | | M. L. Vasanthakumari | 500 p |
| 26 | 8 July 2018 | | Damodar Hari Chapekar | 500 p |
| * | India-South Africa: Joint Issue | | | |
| 27 | 26 July 2018 | | Nelson Mandela | 2500 p |
| 27 | 26 July 2018 | | Mahatma Gandhi | 500 p |
| 28 | 28 July 2018 | | National Viral Hepatitis Control Program | 500 p |
| * | Geographical Indication (GI) Registered Handloom Products | | | |
| 29 | 7 August 2018 | | Tangaliya Shawl | 500 p |
| 29 | 7 August 2018 | | Kashmir Pashmina | 500 p |
| 29 | 7 August 2018 | | Pochampally Ikat | 500 p |
| 29 | 7 August 2018 | | Bhagalpuri silk | 500 p |
| 29 | 7 August 2018 | | Baluchari sari | 500 p |
| 30 | 15 August 2018 | | Holiday Destinations in India | 1500 p |
| 30 | 15 August 2018 | | Holiday Destinations in India | 1500 p |
| 31 | 25 August 2018 | | Patna University | 500 p |
| * | India-Armenia: Joint Issue | | | 500 p |
| 32 | 29 August 2018 | | Hov Arek Dance | 2500 p |
| 32 | 29 August 2018 | | Manipuri dance | |
| 33 | 3 September 2018 | | Martyr Mahadevappa Mailar | 500 p |
| * | India Serbia: Joint Issue | | | |
| 34 | 15 September 2018 | | Nikola Tesla | 500 p |
| 34 | 15 September 2018 | | Swami Vivekananda | 2500 p |
| 35 | 17 September 2018 | | Hislop College, Nagpur | 500 p |
| 36 | 23 September 2018 | | Sant Ganinath | 500 p |
| * | 150th Birth Anniversary of Mahatma Gandhi | | | |
| 37 | 2 October 2018 | | Mahatma Gandhi | 500 p |
| 37 | 2 October 2018 | | Mahatma Gandhi | 1200 p |
| 37 | 2 October 2018 | | Mahatma Gandhi | 2000 p |
| 37 | 2 October 2018 | | Mahatma Gandhi | 2200 p |
| 37 | 2 October 2018 | | Mahatma Gandhi | 2500 p |
| 37 | 2 October 2018 | | Mahatma Gandhi | 2500 p |
| 37 | 2 October 2018 | | Mahatma Gandhi | 4100 p |
| 38 | 3 November 2018 | | 3rd Battalion - The Rajputana Rifles | 500 p |
| * | Communal Harmony | | | |
| 39 | 14 November 2018 | | Communal Harmony | 1500 p |
| 39 | 14 November 2018 | | Communal Harmony | 1500 p |
| 40 | 27 November 2018 | | Utkal University | 500 p |
| * | Odisha Hockey Men's World Cup 2018 Bhubaneswar | | | |
| 41 | 28 November 2018 | | Logo | 500 p |
| 41 | 28 November 2018 | | Men playing hockey | 500 p |
| 41 | 28 November 2018 | | Men playing hockey | 500 p |
| 41 | 28 November 2018 | | Men playing hockey | 500 p |
| 41 | 28 November 2018 | | Men playing hockey | 500 p |
| 42 | 13 December 2018 | | Ustad Sabri Khan | 500 p |
| 43 | 18 December 2018 | | Raj Kumar Shukla | 500 p |
| 44 | 19 December 2018 | | Gulabrao Maharaj | 500 p |
| * | National Police Memorial | | | |
| 45 | 22 December 2018 | | National Police Memorial | 1000 p |
| 45 | 22 December 2018 | | National Police Memorial | 1500 p |
| 46 | 24 December 2018 | | Paika Rebellion | 500 p |
| 47 | 28 December 2018 | | Kakaji & Pappaji | 500 p |
| 48 | 29 December 2018 | | Maharaja Suheldev | 500 p |
| * | Hill Forts of Rajasthan - UNESCO World Heritage sites in India | | | |
| 49 | 29 December 2018 | | Kumbhalgarh Fort | 500 p |
| 49 | 29 December 2018 | | Gagron Fort | 500 p |
| 49 | 29 December 2018 | | Ranthambore Fort | 500 p |
| 49 | 29 December 2018 | | Amber Fort | 1200 p |
| 49 | 29 December 2018 | | Jaisalmer Fort | 1200 p |
| 49 | 29 December 2018 | | Chittorgarh Fort | 1200 p |
| * | 75th Anniversary of the First Flag Hoisting at Port Blair | | | |
| 50 | 30 December 2018 | | | 1200 p |
| 50 | 30 December 2018 | | | 2200 p |
| 50 | 30 December 2018 | | | 4100 p |
| * | Geographical Indication (GI) Registered Handicraft Products | | | |
| 51 | 31 December 2018 | | Blue pottery of Jaipur | 500 p |
| 51 | 31 December 2018 | | Kutch embroidery | 500 p |
| 51 | 31 December 2018 | | Karnataka Bronzeware | 500 p |
| 51 | 31 December 2018 | | Maddalam of Palakkad | 500 p |
| 51 | 31 December 2018 | | Sikki Grass Products of Bihar | 500 p |
| * | Indian Fashion Through the Ages: Series 1 | | | |
| 52 | 31 December 2018 | | Mughal period | 500 p |
| 52 | 31 December 2018 | | Awadh period | 500 p |
| 52 | 31 December 2018 | | Harappa & Mohenjo-daro Maurya & Sunga period | 1500 p |
| 52 | 31 December 2018 | | Indian princely states | 1500 p |

== 2019 ==
| # | Issue date | Image | Description | Denomination |
|---|---|---|---|---|
| 1 | 24 January 2019 | | Central Institute of Plastics Engineering & Technology | 41.00 |
| 2 | 25 January 2019 | | Mahamati Prannath | 5.00 |
| 3 | 30 January 2019 | | Financial Inclusion | 5.00 |
| 4 | 2 February 2019 | | Kumbh Mela, Prayagraj | 5.00 |
| 5 | 19 February 2019 | | IIT(BHU) | 5.00 |
| * | Aero India - 2019 (set of 2 Stamps) | | | |
| 6 | 23 February 2019 | | Aero India - 2019 | 5.00 |
| 6 | 23 February 2019 | | Aero India - 2019 | 25.00 |
| 7 | 6 March 2019 | | Ram Chand Paul | 5.00 |
| 8 | 9 March 2019 | | Kuber Nath Rai | 5.00 |
| 9 | 12 April 2019 | | Punjab National Bank | 5.00 |
| * | 100 Years Of Jallianwala Bagh Massacre (set of 2 Stamps) | | | |
| 10 | 13 April 2019 | | 100 Years Of Jallianwala Bagh Massacre | 25.00 |
| 10 | 13 April 2019 | | 100 Years Of Jallianwala Bagh Massacre | 5.00 |
| 11 | 2 May 2019 | | Vedanta Desikan | 5.00 |
| * | Indian Fashion-Sari in myriad forms: Series 2 (set of 4 Stamps) | | | |
| 12 | 12 June 2019 | | Brahmika Sari | 5.00 |
| 12 | 12 June 2019 | | Pathare Prabhu | 5.00 |
| 12 | 12 June 2019 | | Silver Screen | 12.00 |
| 12 | 12 June 2019 | | Traditional Parsi Attire | 12.00 |
| 13 | 17 June 2019 | | Ahimso Parmo Dharma | 15.00 |
| 13 | 17 June 2019 | | Ahimso Parmo Dharma | 15.00 |
| 14 | 6 July 2019 | | Fakir Mohan College, Balasore | 500 p |
| 15 | 30 July 2019 | | India-Korea Joint Issue - Queen Heo | 500 p |
| 15 | 30 July 2019 | | India-Korea Joint Issue - Princess Suriratna | 2500 p |
| 16 | 1 August 2019 | | Indian perfumes - Sandalwood | 2500p |
| 16 | 1 August 2019 | | Indian perfumes - Sandalwood | 2500p |
| 16 | 1 August 2019 | | Indian perfumes - Jasmine | 2500p |
| 16 | 1 August 2019 | | Indian perfumes - Jasmine | 2500p |
| 17 | 15 August 2019 | | Gandhian Heritage in Modern India | 1500p |
| 17 | 15 August 2019 | | Gandhian Heritage in Modern India | 2500p |
| * | Indians in First World War (set of 3 MS) | | | |
| 18 | 20 August 2019 | | Indra Lal Roy | 15.00 |
| 18 | 20 August 2019 | | Lt HS Malik | 15.00 |
| 18 | 20 August 2019 | | Lt S C Wellingkar | 5.00 |
| 18 | 20 August 2019 | | Lt E S Chunder Sen | 5.00 |
| 18 | 20 August 2019 | | India Gate | 10.00 |
| 18 | 20 August 2019 | | Teen Murti Haifa Delhi | 10.00 |
| 18 | 20 August 2019 | | Menin Gate | 5.00 |
| 18 | 20 August 2019 | | Chattri, Brighton | 5.00 |
| 18 | 20 August 2019 | | Neuve Chapelle Memorial France | 5.00 |
| 18 | 20 August 2019 | | Indian Military Memorial France | 10.00 |
| 18 | 20 August 2019 | | Mesopotamia | 5.00 |
| 18 | 20 August 2019 | | France - Belgium | 5.00 |
| 19 | 24 August 2019 | | Calavala Cunnan Chetty | 500 p |
| * | Master Healers of AYUSH (set of 12 stamps) | | | |
| 20 | 30 August 2019 | | Dinshaw Mehta | 5.00 |
| 20 | 30 August 2019 | | Bhaskar Vishwananth Ghokale | 5.00 |
| 20 | 30 August 2019 | | Brihaspati Dev Triguna | 5.00 |
| 20 | 30 August 2019 | | Swami Kuvalayananda | 5.00 |
| 20 | 30 August 2019 | | Maharishi Mahesh Yogi | 5.00 |
| 20 | 30 August 2019 | | Shastri Shankar Daji Pade | 5.00 |
| 20 | 30 August 2019 | | KG Saxena | 5.00 |
| 20 | 30 August 2019 | | T. V. Sambasivam Pillai | 5.00 |
| 20 | 30 August 2019 | | Muhammad Abdul Aziz Lakhnawi | 5.00 |
| 20 | 30 August 2019 | | K. Raghavan Thirumulpad | 5.00 |
| 20 | 30 August 2019 | | Yadav Ji Trikam Ji Acharya | 5.00 |
| 20 | 30 August 2019 | | Muhammad Kabiruddin | 5.00 |
| * | Indian Fashion Series: 3 (set of 4 Stamps) | | | |
| 21 | 6 September 2019 | | Fashion Designer | 1500 p |
| 21 | 6 September 2019 | | Fashion Show | 1500 p |
| 21 | 6 September 2019 | | Costume Designing | 1000 p |
| 21 | 6 September 2019 | | Mass Production | 1000 p |
| * | 150th Birth Anniversary of Mahatma Gandhi (set of 6 Stamps) | | | |
| 22 | 2 October 2019 | | Gandhi as a Child | 2500 p |
| 22 | 2 October 2019 | | Gandhi as a Student | 2500 p |
| 22 | 2 October 2019 | | Gandhi with Wife | 2500 p |
| 22 | 2 October 2019 | | Gandhi with Spinning Wheel | 2500 p |
| 22 | 2 October 2019 | | Gandhi in Later Years | 2500 p |
| 22 | 2 October 2019 | | See No Evil Hear No Evil Speak No Evil | 2500 p |
| 23 | 06 October 2019 | | The Samaja | 500 p |
| 24 | 09 October 2019 | | Marshal of The Indian Air Force Arjan Singh DFC | 500 p |
| * | Indian Perfumes: (set of 4 Stamps) | | | |
| 25 | 15 October 2019 | | Sandalwood Perfume in Bottle | 2500 p |
| 25 | 15 October 2019 | | Sandalwood Plant | 2500 p |
| 25 | 15 October 2019 | | Jasmine Essential Oil | 2500 p |
| 25 | 15 October 2019 | | Jasmine Flower and Bottle | 2500 p |
| * | Historic Gates of Indian Forts and Monuments: (set of 8 Stamps) | | | |
| 26 | 19 October 2019 | | Buland Darwaza, Fatehpur Sikri | 1000 p |
| 26 | 19 October 2019 | | Kote Gate, Bikaner | 500 p |
| 26 | 19 October 2019 | | Jorawar Singh Gate, Jaipur | 500 p |
| 26 | 19 October 2019 | | Sardar Market Gate, Jodhpur | 500 p |
| 26 | 19 October 2019 | | Kashmiri Gate, Delhi | 500 p |
| 26 | 19 October 2019 | | Rumi Darwaza, Lucknow | 500 p |
| 26 | 19 October 2019 | | Magazine Gate, Ajmer | 500 p |
| 26 | 19 October 2019 | | Delhi Gate, Delhi | 1000 p |
| 27 | 25 October 2019 | | Siachen Glacier | 500 p |
| * | 550th Birth Anniversary of Guru Nanak Dev Ji: (set of 5 Stamps) | | | |
| 28 | 9 November 2019 | | Gurdwara Nanak Lama Sahib Chungthang | 1000 p |
| 28 | 9 November 2019 | | Gurdwara Darbar Sahib Dera Baba Nanak | 1000 p |
| 28 | 9 November 2019 | | Gurdwara Janam Asthan Nankana Sahib, Pakistan | 1000 p |
| 28 | 9 November 2019 | | Guru Nanak Jhira Sahib, Bider | 1000 p |
| 28 | 9 November 2019 | | Gurdwara Ber Sahib Sultanpur Lothi | 1500 p |
| * | Children's Day: (set of 2 Stamps) | | | |
| 29 | 14 November 2019 | | Child Rights | 1500 p |
| 29 | 14 November 2019 | | Child Rights | 1500 p |
| 30 | 22 November 2019 | | Mathew M. Kuzhiveli | 500 p |
| 31 | 26 November 2019 | | 250th Rajya Sabha Session | 500 p |
| * | Char Dham, Uttarakhand: (set of 4 Stamps) | | | |
| 32 | 29 November 2019 | | Yamunotri Shrine | 1000 p |
| 32 | 29 November 2019 | | Gangotri Shrine | 1000 p |
| 32 | 29 November 2019 | | Kedarnath Shrine | 1500 p |
| 32 | 29 November 2019 | | Badrinath Shrine | 1500 p |
| 33 | 14 December 2019 | | The Force Multiplier | 500 p |
| * | Embroideries of India: (set of 12 Stamps) | | | |
| 32 | 19 December 2019 | | Phulkari Embroidery | 1000 p |
| 32 | 19 December 2019 | | Kutch Embroidery | 1000 p |
| 32 | 19 December 2019 | | Kasuti Embroidery | 1000 p |
| 32 | 19 December 2019 | | Chicankari Embroidery | 1000 p |
| 32 | 19 December 2019 | | Toda Embroidery | 1000 p |
| 32 | 19 December 2019 | | Kamal Kadhai Embroidery | 1500 p |
| 32 | 19 December 2019 | | Kantha Embroidery | 1500 p |
| 32 | 19 December 2019 | | Kashmiri Embroidery | 1500 p |
| 32 | 19 December 2019 | | Chamba Rumal Embroidery | 2000 p |
| 32 | 19 December 2019 | | Shamilani Embroidery | 2000 p |
| 32 | 19 December 2019 | | Sujani Embroidery | 2000 p |
| 32 | 19 December 2019 | | Applique | 2000 p |
| 35 | 26 December 2019 | | Directorate of Revenue Intelligence | 500 p |

== 2020 ==
| # | Issue date | Image | Description | Denomination |
|---|---|---|---|---|
| * | Indian Fashion - Designers' Creations: Series 4, (Set of 9 Stamps) | | | |
| 1 | 14 January 2020 | | Vastra | 05.00 |
| 1 | 14 January 2020 | | Indica Emporia | 05.00 |
| 1 | 14 January 2020 | | Classic Jalabiya | 05.00 |
| 1 | 14 January 2020 | | The Ambika Jacket | 05.00 |
| 1 | 14 January 2020 | | Varanasi Weaves | 05.00 |
| 1 | 14 January 2020 | | Embellishment | 05.00 |
| 1 | 14 January 2020 | | Mystical Indian | 05.00 |
| 1 | 14 January 2020 | | Timeless | 05.00 |
| 1 | 14 January 2020 | | Flared Shervani | 05.00 |
| 2 | 22 January 2020 | | 100 Years of International Labour Organization | 05.00 |
| * | Constitution of India, (Set of 2 Stamps) | | | |
| 3 | 26 January 2020 | | Constitution of India - Ashoka Pillar | 10.00 |
| 3 | 26 January 2020 | | Constitution of India - Politicians at Table | 10.00 |
| 4 | 12 February 2020 | | 4th Battalion(Outram's) The Rajputana Rifles | 05.00 |
| 15 | 17 February 2020 | | Industrial City: Jamshedpur | 05.00 |
| * | UNESCO World Heritage Sites - II, (Set of 5 Stamps) | | | |
| 6 | 16 March 2020 | | Great Himalayan National Park | 05.00 |
| 6 | 16 March 2020 | | Manas National Park | 05.00 |
| 6 | 16 March 2020 | | Nanda Devi and Valley of Flowers National Parks | 12.00 |
| 6 | 16 March 2020 | | Nanda Devi and Valley of Flowers National Parks | 12.00 |
| 6 | 16 March 2020 | | Western Ghats | 12.00 |
| * | Musical Instruments of Wandering Minstrels - II, (Set of 6 Se-tenant Stamps) | | | |
| 7 | 25 June 2020 | | Algoza | 05.00 each |
| 7 | 25 June 2020 | | Burrakatha Dakki | 05.00 |
| 7 | 25 June 2020 | | Ektara | 05.00 each |
| 7 | 25 June 2020 | | Kamaicha | 05.00 each |
| 7 | 25 June 2020 | | Ravanahatha | 05.00 each |
| 7 | 25 June 2020 | | Surando | 05.00 each |
| * | Terracotta Temples of India, (Set of 7 Stamps) | | | |
| 8 | 8 August 2020 | | Madan Mohan Temple, Bishnupur | 05.00 |
| 8 | 8 August 2020 | | Nebiya Khera Temple, Bhadwara | 05.00 |
| 8 | 8 August 2020 | | Lakshman Temple, Sirpur | 05.00 |
| 8 | 8 August 2020 | | Lalji Temple, Kalna | 12.00 |
| 8 | 8 August 2020 | | Shyam Rai Temple, Bishnupur | 12.00 |
| 8 | 8 August 2020 | | Jor Bangla Temple, Bishnupur | 05.00 |
| 8 | 8 August 2020 | | Indralath Temple, Ranipur Jharial | 05.00 |
| * | UNESCO World Heritage Sites in India -III Cultural Sites, (Set of 5 Stamps) | | | |
| 9 | 15 August 2020 | | Qutub Minar and its Monuments, Delhi | 05.00 |
| 9 | 15 August 2020 | | Khajooraho group of Monuments, Javari Temple | 05.00 |
| 9 | 15 August 2020 | | Group of Monuments at Pattadakal | 05.00 |
| 9 | 15 August 2020 | | Churches and Convents of Goa - Church of Bom Jejus | 05.00 |
| 9 | 15 August 2020 | | Historic City of Ahmadabad - Sarkhej Roza | 05.00 |
| * | 150th Birth Anniversary of Mahatma Gandhi, (Set of 4 Stamps) | | | |
| 10 | 2 October 2020 | | Self Reliance | 15.00 |
| 10 | 2 October 2020 | | Health and Nature Cure | 05.00 |
| 10 | 2 October 2020 | | Experiments in Education - Nai Talim | 25.00 |
| 10 | 2 October 2020 | | Ecology and Environment | 05.00 |
| 11 | 23 October 2020 | | 75 Years of the United Nations | 05.00 |
| 12 | 4 December 2020 | | I.K.Gujral | 05.00 |
| 13 | 17 December 2020 | | Sheikh Mujibur Rahman | 05.00 |
| * | Salute to Covid-19 Warriors (Set of 4 Stamps) | | | |
| 14 | 24 December 2020 | | Salute to Covid-19 Warriors | 10.00 |
| 14 | 24 December 2020 | | Salute to Covid-19 Warriors | 10.00 |
| 14 | 24 December 2020 | | Salute to Covid-19 Warriors | 10.00 |
| 14 | 24 December 2020 | | Salute to Covid-19 Warriors | 10.00 |
| 15 | 27 December 2020 | | Manikchandra Vajpayee | 05.00 |
