= List of people on the postage stamps of India =

This is a list of people on the postage stamps of India.

== A ==
- Sheikh Mohammad Abdullah, politician, Premier and Chief Minister of Jammu & Kashmir (1988)
- Maraimalai Adigal, Tamil lecturer, scholar and researcher (2007)
- Jyoti Prasad Agarwala Cultural icon, nationalist, musician, poet and humanist (2004)
- Salim Ali, Ornithologist, explorer, ecologist, teacher and writer (1996)
- Zamin Ali, Educator, Poet, founded the first Department of Urdu in India.
- Dhirubhai Ambani, industrialist of Gujarat (2002)
- B. R. Ambedkar, founder of Navayana Buddhism, architect of the Constitution of India (1966, 1973, 1991, 2001, 2009, 2013, 2015, 2016, 2017)
- Annamacharya Saint, social reformer and singer-poet (2004)
- Abdul Qaiyum Ansari (2005)
- Mukhtar Ahmed Ansari Congress President Ghazipur
- Frank Anthony Parliamentarian, jurist, educationist and philanthropist (2003)
- Sree Sree Thakur Anukulchandra (1987)
- Talimeren Ao, footballer and physician (2018)
- M. V. Arunachalam, businessman and Chairman of Murugappa Group (2018)
- Rukmini Devi Arundale (1987)
- Sri Aurobindo, Indian philosopher, author and nationalist
- Chandra Shekhar Azad revolutionary (1988)

== B ==
- Bhagwan Baba, Ascetic, mystic and saint-poet (2002)
- Sant Gadge Baba Religious philosopher, social reformer and saint (1998)
- Homi Jehangir Bhabha, nuclear physicist
- Harivansh Rai Bachchan, Hindi writer and poet (2003)
- Ecoman Vijaypal Baghel, environmentalist (2001)
- Hemwati Nandan Bahuguna, politician (2018)
- Allah Jilai Bai (2003)
- Kanika Bandopadhyay, Exponent of Rabindra Sangeet (2002)
- Tarashankar Bandopadhyay, Bangla Author and Jnanpith Award Winner (1998)
- Sibnath Banerjee (1997)
- Thakkar Bapa, Social Worker (1969)
- Radha Gobinda Baruah (2000)
- Panna Lal Barupal (2006)
- Basaveswara, Social reformer, From Karnataka (1997)
- Vaikom Muhammad Basheer (2009)
- D.R. Bendre, Kannada Author and Jnanpith Award Winner (1998)
- Homi Bhaba (1996)
- Rajarshi Bhagyachandra (2000)
- M. Bhaktavatsalam (2008)
- Raja Bhamashah (2000)
- Neeraja Bhanot, Indian Flight Attendant and Ashok Chakra Winner (2004)
- Subramania Bharati, poet and statesman (1960)
- Mukut Behari Bhargava (2003)
- Vishnu Narayan Bhatkhande musician (1961)
- Acharya Bhikshu, Founder of Jain Svetambar Terapanth sect (2004)
- Brajlal Biyani (2002)
- Sree Sree Borda (2010)
- Jagadis Chandra Bose, scientist (1958)
- Sarat Chandra Bose, Freedom Fighter, President of Bengal Pradesh Congress Committee, Member of the interim cabinet
- Subhas Chandra Bose, Freedom Fighter, President of Indian National Congress, Head of Azad Hind government
- Louis Braille (2009)
- Swami Brahmanand, Freedom fighter, member of parliament, social reformer (1997)
- Buddha (1956, 2007)
- S.D. Burman, Music composer and singer (2007)

== C ==
- Bhikaiji Cama, Freedom Fighter (1962)
- William Carey, missionary
- M C Chagla, Jurist, judge, educationist, diplomat, Union Cabinet Minister and Statesman (2004)
- Arun Kumar Chanda (2000)
- Krishan Chander, author (2017)
- Prabodh Chandra (2005)
- Thakur Anukul Chandra (1987)
- Kittur Rani Channamma Queen of Kittur (1977)
- Damodar Hari Chapekar, revolutionary (2018)
- Bankim Chandra Chatterjee, novelist and author of "Vande Mataram"
- Sarat Chandra Chattopadhyay, novelist (1976)
- Prithviraj Chauhan, king during the Chahamanas of Shakambhari dynasty (2000, 2018: series of 4 stamps)
- Subhadra Kumari Chauhan, poet (1976)
- S.B. Chavan, politician (2007)
- Father Kuriakose Elias Chavara (1987)
- A. M. M. Murugappa Chettiar (2005)
- Rajah Sir Muthiah Chettiar (1987)
- R.M. Algappa Chettiar (2007)
- S. Rm. M. Annamalai Chettiar (1980)
- Calava Cunnan Chetty, founder of a university in Tamil Nadu (2019)
- Chhatrasal, Bundela Ruler (1987)
- Dheeran Chinnamalai (2005)
- Frédéric Chopin, Music composer for the Piano (2001)
- Jaglal Choudhary (2000)
- T.B. Cunha, Goan freedom Fighter (1998)

== D ==
- Jawaharlal Darda (2005)
- Baba Raghav Das, Ascetic, reformer and freedom fighter (1998)
- Chittaranjan Das Freedom Fighter, founder of Swaraj Party
- Lokanayak Omeo Kumar Das (1998)
- Lala Deen Dayal (2006)
- D. B. Deodhar, Cricket Player (1996)
- C. D. Deshmukh (2004)
- Durgabai Deshmukh, freedom fighter and social activist (1982)
- Nanaji Deshmukh, politician (2017)
- Purushottam Laxman Deshpande (2002)
- Ashapoorna Devi, Bangla Author and Jnanpith Award Winner (1998)
- Bishnu Dey, Bangla Author and Jnanpith Award Winner (1998)
- Ramdhari Singh Dinkar
- Jairamdas Doulatram, politician and freedom fighter (1985)
- Dnyaneshwar, saint (1997)
- Kunji Lal Dubey (1996)
- Henry Dunant, Red Cross founder (1957)
- Guru Dutt, Director, actor and film producer (2004)
- Hazari Prasad Dwivedi, Hindi author (1997)

== E ==
- Edward VII of the United Kingdom (1902)
- Albert Einstein, physicist (2005)
- Eknath, saint (2003)

== F ==
- Lalan Fakir (2003)

== G ==
- D.R. Gadgil, Economist (2008)
- Bhaurao Krishnarao Gaikwad (2002)
- Indira Gandhi, Politician and Indian Prime Minister (1984, 1985)
- Kasturba Gandhi (1996)
- Mahatma Gandhi (1948, 1998, 2001, 2005, 2007, 2008, 2009, 2011, 2018: series of 7 stamps for 150th birthday & 2018: India–South Africa Joint Issue, with Mandela stamp, 2019: series of 5 stamps for 150th birthday)
- Rajiv Gandhi (2004)
- Sanjay Gandhi (1981)
- Virchand Gandhi, 19th Century Indian Legend (2009)
- Gemini Ganesan Actor (2006)
- Savitri Ganesan Actress (2011)
- Tyagamurti Goswami Ganeshdutt (1987)
- Balwant Gargi, writer and academic (2017)
- B D Garware, Industrialist (2004)
- George V of the United Kingdom (1911)
- George VI of the United Kingdom (1937)
- Mirza Ghalib, poet (1953)
- Ghantasala, Playback singer and music director (2003)
- Guru Ghasidas (1987)
- Ritwik Ghatak, Script writer and Film Director (2007)
- Santidev Ghose (2002)
- V.K. Gokak, Kannada Author and Jnanpith Award Winner (1998)
- Bhaskar Vishwananth Ghokale (2019)
- Aloysius Gonzaga (2001)
- Sagarmal Gopa, Freedom fighter (1986)
- Tripuraneni Gopichand, Telugu Novelist and Film Director (2011)
- Narayan Ganesh Goray (1998)
- Babu Gulabrai, writer and philosopher (2002)
- D. V. Gundappa, Kannada poet (1988)
- Shyam Lal Gupt 'Parshad' (1997)
- Sane Guruji, Socio/Political Development Leader (2001)

== H ==
- Waldemar Haffkine, Plague Vaccine formulator (1960)
- Hafiz (2004)
- Lala Hardayal, Freedom Fighter (1987)
- Matangini Hazra (2002)
- Walchand Hirachand (2004)
- Dr. Hiralal (1987)
- Allan Octavian Hume Civil Servant, Founder of Indian National Congress (1973)
- Zakir Husain (1998)

== I ==
- Vaidyanatha Iyer, freedom fighter, Madurai, Tamil Nadu (1999)

== J ==
- Jagdish Chandra Jain (1998)
- Jayadeva
- Sir Phiroze Jamshedjee Jeejeebhoy, financier, philanthropist (1959)
- Sir William Jones (1997)

== K ==
- Kabir, poet/saint (1953, 2004)
- A. P. J. Abdul Kalam, Indian President and Missile Man of the nation (2015)
- Mohammad Kabiruddin (2019)
- Veeran Azhagu Muthu Kone (2015)
- Zorawar Singh Kahluria, general in the Sikh Empire (2000)
- Pratap Singh Kairon (2005)
- Hemu Kalani
- Ayyan Kali (2002)
- Kalidasa, poet (1960)
- Vi. Kalyanasundarnar (2005)
- Krishan Kant (2005)
- K. Shivarama Karanth, Kannada Author and Jnanpith Award Winner (2003)
- Dhondo Keshav Karve, educator (1958)
- Dr. Kailash Nath Katju, Freedom fighter (1987)
- Udumalai Narayana Kavi (2008)
- C. Kesavan, politician (2018)
- Vakkom Abdul Khader (1998)
- Bade Ghulam Ali Khan (2003)
- Hakim Ajmal Khan, Freedom fighter (1987)
- Mehboob Khan (2007)
- Syed Ahmad Khan (1998)
- Ustad Bismillah Khan, Shehnai maestro (2008)
- Ustad Hafiz Ali Khan (2000)
- Ustad Sabri Khan, sarangi musician (2018)
- Vishnu Sakharam Khandekar (1998)
- Rajesh Khanna, Actor (2013)
- Martin Luther King Jr. (1969, 2008)
- S.L. Kirloskar (2003)
- Saifuddin Kitchlew, freedom fighter (1989)
- Jhalkari Bai Koli (2001)
- Abai Qunanbaiuly (1996)
- Damodar Dharmananda Kosambi, mathematician, statistician, and polymath (2008)
- T.T. Krishnamachari (2002)
- Jiddu Krishnamurti (1987)
- Hemant Kumar (2003)
- Kishore Kumar (2003)
- Tirupur Kumaran, Freedom fighter (2004)
- Hanagal Kumaraswamiji, saint, holy leader (2017)
- Pandit Hridya Nath Kunzru, Freedom fighter (1987)
- G. Sankara Kurup (2003)
- Kusumagraj (2003)
- Swami Kuvalayananda (2019)
- M.M. Kuzhiveli (2019)

== L ==
- Mohammad Abdul Aziz Lakhnawi (2019)
- V Lakshminarayana (2004)
- Rukmini Lakshmipathi (1997)
- Nupee Lal (2004)
- Henning Holck-Larsen, cofounder of Larsen and Tubro (2008)
- Laxmibai, Rani of Jhansi (1957)
- Madhu Limaye (1997)
- Abraham Lincoln (2008)
- Ram Manohar Lohia (1997)
- Narayan Meghaji Lokhande (2005)
- Harchand Singh Longowal (1987)
- Sahir Ludhianvi (2013)

== M ==
- Anandamayi Ma (1987)
- Madhubala, Film Actress (2008)
- Baldev Ram Mirdha, Indian independence activist and social reformer (1989)
- Mehr Chand Mahajan, Chief Justice of the Supreme Court of India (2017)
- Begum Hazrat Mahal (1984)
- Chaitanya Mahaprabhu (1986)
- Gulabrao Maharaj, philosopher and Hindi saint (2018))
- Kakaji Maharaj (2003)
- Sant Santaji Jagnade Maharaj (2009)
- Sri Ramana Maharshi (1998)
- Dr. Harekrushna Mahtab (2000)
- Maharana Pratap, Indian king (1967)
- Mahadevappa Mailar, martyr (2018)
- Asrar Ul Haq 'Majaaz', Urdu Poet (2008)
- Madan Mohan Malaviya, educator (1961)
- B. P. Mandal (2001)
- Nelson Mandela, (2018: India–South Africa Joint Issue, with Gandhi stamp)
- Field Marshal SHFJ Manekshaw, Indian Army Officer (2008)
- Vinoo Mankad, Cricket Player (1996)
- Murasoli Maran (2004)
- Chandragupta Maurya (2001)
- Meera, princess (1953)
- Balwantrai Mehta (2000)
- Dinshaw Mehta (2019)
- A.V. Meiyappan (2006)
- Vijay Merchant, Cricket Player (1996)
- Dwarka Prasad Mishra (2001)
- Narendra Mohan (2003)
- Atukuri Molla, poet (2017)
- Syama Prasad Mookerjee, Nationalist (2001)
- Lord Mountbatten of Burma, last viceroy and first governor-general of India
- Muddana, poet (2017)
- Mukesh, Playback singer (2003)
- Ajoy Kumar Mukherjee (2002)
- Muktai, Poet-saint (2003)
- Pankaj Kumar Mullick (2006)
- Giani Gurumukh Singh Musafir, Socio/Political Development Leader (2001)

== N ==
- Rani Velu Nachchiyar (2008)
- Harakh Chand Nahata (2009)
- J. P. Naik (2007)
- C. Sankaran Nair, Nationalist (2001)
- E.M.S. Namboodiripad, Socio/Political Development Leader (2001)
- Dadabhai Naoroji, businessman, British MP, co-founder Indian National Congress (2017)
- Raj Narain (2007)
- Jaiprakash Narayan
- R. K. Narayan, Writer (2009)
- Nargis, actress and parliament member (1993)
- Col. C.K. Nayudu, Cricket Player (1996)
- Jawaharlal Nehru, Political leader and the first Prime Minister of independent India (1997, 2005)
- Kamala Nehru
- Motilal Nehru, freedom leader (1961)
- Rameshwari Nehru, Women's rights campaigner (1987)
- S. Nijalingappa, Ex chief minister Of Karnataka, Former of Modern Karnataka (2003)
- U Kiang Nongbah, Nationalist (2001)

== P ==
- Shastri Shankar Daji Pade (2019)
- Bipin Chandra Pal, freedom leader (1958)
- Dr. B.P. Pal (2008)
- Nanabhoy Palkhivala (2004)
- Chittu Pandey
- Mangal Pandey
- Marudhu Pandiar Brothers (2004)
- Vijaya Lakshmi Pandit (2000)
- A.T. Paneerselvam (2008)
- P N Panicker (2004)
- Pāṇini (2004)
- Govindaro Pansare (2003)
- Ramakrishna Paramahamsa, Saint (1967)
- Chaudhary Brahm Parkash, Leader and former chief minister of Delhi (2001)
- Maharaja Bijli Pasi (2000)
- Babubhai Patel, Pappaji on the "Pappaji and Kakaji" stamp, brothers and co-founders of the Yogi Divine Society (2018)
- Dadubhai Patel, Kakaji on the "Pappaji and Kakaji" stamp, brothers and co-founders of the Yogi Divine Society (2018)
- Manoharbhai Patel (2007)
- Vallabhbhai Patel, Freedom Fighter, First Deputy Prime Minister and Home Minister
- Vithalbhai Patel, Political Leader (1973)
- Vithalrao Vikhe Patil (2002)
- Biju Patnaik, politician (2018)
- Shivahirao Ganesh Patwardhan, freedom fighter, physician, devoted efforts to leprosy patients (2017)
- Ram Chand Paul, scientist, Vice-Chancellor of Panjab University (2019)
- Sheikh Tambi Pavalar (2008)
- Devaneya Pavanar, Tamil author (2006)
- Baji Rao Peshwa (2004)
- Savitribai Phule (1998)
- Kavimani Desika Vinayagam Pillai (2005)
- Thakazhi Sivasankara Pillai (2003)
- T.V. Sambasivam Pillai (2019)
- Rajesh Pilot, politician (2008)
- S.K. Pottekkatt (2003)
- Kavi Pradeep (2011)
- Swami Pranavananda (2002)
- Saint Mahamati Prannath, follower and namesake of Pranami tradition of Hinduism (2019)
- Jagdev Prasad (2001)
- L.V. Prasad, Film actor, producer and director (2006)
- K.V. Puttappa, writer (1998, 2017)

== R ==
- Bishnu Prasad Rabha (2009)
- Mohammad Rafi (2003)
- Bishwanath Rai (2006)
- Kuber Nath Rai, Sanskrit writer and scholar (2019)
- P. S. Kumaraswamy Raja, politician (1999)
- Shrimad Rajchandra, poet, mystic and philosopher (2017)
- Alluri Sitarama Raju, Freedom fighter (1986)
- V.K. Rajwade (2003)
- M. G. Ramachandran, politician and actor (2017)
- Tripuraneni Ramaswamy, Freedom Fighter (1987)
- N.G. Ranga, Socio/Political Development Leader (2001)
- N. T. Rama Rao Actor, Politician, Chief Minister of Andhra Pradesh
- Swami Rangnathananda Maharaj (2008)
- Dr. Burgula Ramakrishna Rao (2000)
- Alluri Sitarama Raju, revolutionary (1986)
- Goparaju Ramachandra Rao (2002)
- Kotamaraju Rama Rao (1997)
- Durgadas Rathore (2003)
- Sant Ravidas (2001)
- Kasu Brahmananda Reddy (2011)
- Yeduguri Sandinti Rajasekhara Reddy, Politician (2010)
- Anand Rishiji (2002)
- Svetoslav Roerich (2004)
- Bimal Roy (2007)
- Lt. Indra Lal Roy, Fighter Pilot, Distinguished Flying Cross (1998)
- M.N. Roy, Freedom Fighter (1987)
- Prafulla Chandra Roy, Scientist (1961)
- Srinivasa Ramanujan, Mathematician (1962)

== S ==
- Chaudhary Charan Singh, former prime minister of India (1990)
- Bhim Sen Sachar, Freedom fighter (1986)
- Muhammad Ismail Sahib (1996)
- Bhisham Sahni, writer and actor (2017)
- Jubba Sahni, Freedom fighter and revolutionary (2001)
- Veer Surendra Sai, Freedom fighter (1986)
- Chandraprava Saikiani (2002)
- Maharshi Bulusu Sambamurthy (2008)
- Damodaram Sanjivayya, Politician and chief minister (2008)
- Rahul Sankrityayan
- Sai Baba of Shirdi, saint and fakir, cross-denominational spiritual master (2008, 2017)
- Swami Sahajanand Saraswati (2000)
- Krishna Nath Sarmah, Nationalist (2001)
- V.G.Suryanarayana Sastriar, Tamil scholar and writer (2007)
- Anna Bhau Sathe (2002)
- S. Satyamurti, Freedom fighter (1987)
- Thakur Satyananda (2002)
- Viswanatha Satyanarayana, writer (2017)
- Savithri (2011)
- Krishna Gopal Saxena (2019)
- Madhavrao Scindia (2005)
- Samanta Chandra Sekhar (2001)
- Anugrah Narayan Sinha (1988), first deputy chief minister of Bihar
- Bhaskara Sethupathy (2004)
- Muhammed Abdurahiman Shahib (1998)
- Shanker Dayal Sharma (2000)
- Major Somnath Sharma, Paramveer Chakra (2003)
- Indra Chandra Shastri (2004)
- Ma Po Shivagnanam (2006)
- Shivaji, Maratha King (1961)
- Swami Shraddhanand (1970)
- Baikunth Shukla, Freedom fighter and revolutionary (2001)
- Raj Kumar Shukla, Freedom fighter, friend of Gandhi (2000, 2018)
- Shrilal Shukla, writer (2017)
- Yogendra Shukla, Freedom fighter and revolutionary (2001)
- Radhanath Sikdar (2004)
- M. Singaravelar (2006)
- Arjan Singh, Marshal of the Indian Air Force (2019)
- Bhagat Puran Singh (2004)
- Giani Zail Singh (1995)
- Nain Singh, pundit (2004)
- Satyendra Narain Singh, freedom fighter & Bihar chief minister
- Shyam Narayan Singh, Freedom fighter and legislator from Bihar (2012)
- Shambhunath Singh, freedom fighter and writer (2017)
- Suraj Narain Singh (2001)
- Veer Narayan Singh, patriot (1987)
- Padampat Singhania (2005)
- Basawon Sinha (2000)
- Anugrah Narayan Sinha, Freedom Fighter & First Deputy Chief Minister of Bihar (1988)
- Alluri Sitaramaraju, Freedom fighter (1986)
- Swami Sivananda (1986)
- Dr. T.S. Soundram (2005)
- R. Srinivasan (2000)
- Potti Sriramulu (2000)
- NMR Subbaraman (2006)
- Yellapragada Subbarao, Scientist (1995)
- M. S. Subbulakshmi (2005)
- K Subrahmanyam (2004)
- Tipu Sultan, Sultan of Mysore and Freedom fighter (1974)
- Sant Kavi Sunderdas (1997)
- Bhaktivedanta Swami (1997)
- Janardan Swami (Saivite, 1914–1989) (2003)
- Siddhar Swamigal (2004)
- Swami Swaroopanandji (2003)
- Surendra Nath Jauhar (2011)

== T ==
- Rabindranath Tagore, poet (1953, 1961, 1987)
- Oliver Reginald Tambo, politician (2018: India–South Africa Joint Issue, with Deendayal Upadhyaya stamp)
- Purushottam Das Tandon, freedom fighter (1982)
- Tansen, Singer (1986)
- Jamshedji Nusserwanji Tata, industrialist (2008)
- J.R.D. Tata, industrialist (1958)
- Sachin Tendulkar (2013)
- Mother Teresa, Humanitarian, Nobel Peace Prize Winner (1980, 1997)
- Nikola Tesla, inventor and engineer (2018: India–Serbia Joint Issue, with Tesla stamp)
- Prabodhankar Thackeray (2002)
- Omkarnath Thakur, Classical Singer (1997)
- Pandit Iyothee Thass (2005)
- P.M. Thevar (1995)
- K. Raghavan Thirumulpad, scholar and physician (2019)
- Thiruvalluvar, Tamil poet (1960)
- Bal Gangadhar Tilak, independence leader (1956)
- Brihaspati Dev Triguna, expert in traditional medicine of pulse diagnosis (2019)
- Acharya Yadavji Trikam, practitioner of traditional ancient Indian medicine (2019)
- Sant Tukaram (2002)
- Tulsidas, poet and saint (1953)
- Tyagaraja, musician (1961)

== U ==
- Uddhavdas Mehta, Indian Independence activist (2026)
- Deendayal Upadhyaya, politician (2018: India–South Africa Joint Issue, with Oliver Reginald Tambo stamp)

== V ==
- Vallabhsuri, Jain saint (2009)
- Saint Vallalar (2007)
- Thillaiyadi Valliammai (2008)
- G. Varadaraj (2006)
- Vaidyaratnam P.S. Varier, Founder of Arya Vaidya Sala, Kottakkal (2002)
- Thirumuruga Kirubananda Variyar (2006)
- Raja Ravi Varma, Painter and artist (1971)
- S. S. Vasan (2004)
- M. L. Vasanthakumari, Carnatic musician and singer (2018)
- Sadhu Vaswani, Educationist (1969)
- Sardar A. Vedaratnam (1998)
- Randhir Prasad Verma, Superintendent of Police and Ashok Chakra Winner (2004)
- Victoria of the United Kingdom (1854)
- Ishwar Chandra Vidyasagar, Educator and social reformer (1970)
- Tenneti Viswanatham (2004)
- Visvesvarayya, The Great engineer and statesman from Karnataka (1960)
- Swami Vivekananda, monk (2013, 2018: India–Serbia Joint Issue)
- Pandit Suryanarayan Vyas, Author (2002)

== Y ==
- Ram Sewak Yadav (1997)
- Sheel Bhadra Yajee (2001)
- Yashpal (2003)
- Paramahansa Yogananda, monk, yogi and guru (1977, 2017)
- Maharishi Mahesh Yogi (2019)

== Z ==
- Bahadur Shah Zafar, Mughal Emperor (1975)
- Bartholomaeus Ziegenbalg, Missionary (2006)

== See also ==
- List of postage stamps of India
