= Dendrobium sect. Holochrysa =

- Dendrobium fimbriatum var. oculatum 'Nepal'

Scientific classification
- Kingdom: Plantae
- Clade: Tracheophytes
- Clade: Angiosperms
- Clade: Monocots
- Order: Asparagales
- Family: Orchidaceae
- Subfamily: Epidendroideae
- Genus: Dendrobium
- Section: Dendrobium sect. Holochrysa; Lindley 1859

Type species
- Dendrobium moschatum

Species
- See text

Subgenus of flowering plants

Dendrobium section Holochrysa is a section of the genus Dendrobium.

== Description ==
Plants in this section have long semi-deciduous canes blooming with multi-flower inflorescence that bloom on leafless stems.

== Distribution ==
Plants from this section are found in China, India, the Himalayas, Taiwan and Indonesia.

== Species ==
Dendrobium section Holochrysa comprises the following species:

Image	Name	Distribution	Elevation (m)
	Dendrobium atavus J.J.Sm. 1905	Java	790 metres (2,590 ft)
	Dendrobium braianense Gagnep. 1938	China (Yunnan), Laos, Thailand and Vietnam	800–1,500 metres (2,600–4,900 ft)
	Dendrobium capillipes Rchb.f. 1867	India, Nepal, Myanmar, Thailand, China (Yunnan), Laos, Vietnam	800–1,500 metres (2,600–4,900 ft)
	Dendrobium chryseum Rolfe 1888	India (Assam), Bangladesh, Bhutan, Nepal, Myanmar, Thailand, Laos, China (Yunnan, Sichuan), Vietnam and Taiwan	1,000–2,600 metres (3,300–8,500 ft)
	Dendrobium chrysocrepis C.S.P.Parish & Rchb.f. ex Hook.f. 1872	China (Yunnan), Myanmar and Thailand	1,370 metres (4,490 ft)
	Dendrobium denneanum Kerr1933	India (Assam), China (Guangxi, Guizhou, Hainan, Yunnan), Nepal, Myanmar, Thailand, Laos, Vietnam and Taiwan	600–2,500 metres (2,000–8,200 ft)
	Dendrobium dixanthum Rchb.f. 1865	Myanmar, Thailand and Laos	200–960 metres (660–3,150 ft)
	Dendrobium fimbriatum Hooker 1823	China (Guangxi, Guizhou, Yunnan), Bangladesh, India (Assam), Nepal, Bhutan, Sikkim, Myanmar, Thailand, Malaysia, Laos and Vietnam	600–2,400 metres (2,000–7,900 ft)
	Dendrobium gibsonii Paxton 1838	India, Nepal, Bhutan, Myanmar, Thailand, China (Guangxi, Yunnan) and Vietnam	650–1,660 metres (2,130–5,450 ft)
	Dendrobium hancockii Rolfe 1903	China (Yunnan)	200–2,150 metres (660–7,050 ft)
	Dendrobium henryi Schltr. 1921	China (Guangxi, Guizhou, Hunan and Yunnan), Vietnam and Thailand	600–1,700 metres (2,000–5,600 ft)
	Dendrobium lohohense Tang & F.T.Wang 1951	China (Sichuan, Guangdong, Guangxi, Guizhou, Hubei, Hunan, Yunnan)	1,000–1,500 metres (3,300–4,900 ft)
	Dendrobium moschatum Sw. 1805	India (Assam, Sikkim), Bangladesh, Nepal, Bhutan, Myanmar, China(Yunnan), Thailand, Laos and Vietnam	300–1,300 metres (980–4,270 ft)
	Dendrobium pulchellum Roxb. ex Lindl. 1830	India (Assam), Bangladesh, Nepal, Myanmar, Thailand, Malaysia, Laos, China (Yunnan), Vietnam	70–2,200 metres (230–7,220 ft)
