= Plicatol =

Plicatol may refer to:

- Plicatol A
- Plicatol B
- Plicatol C
