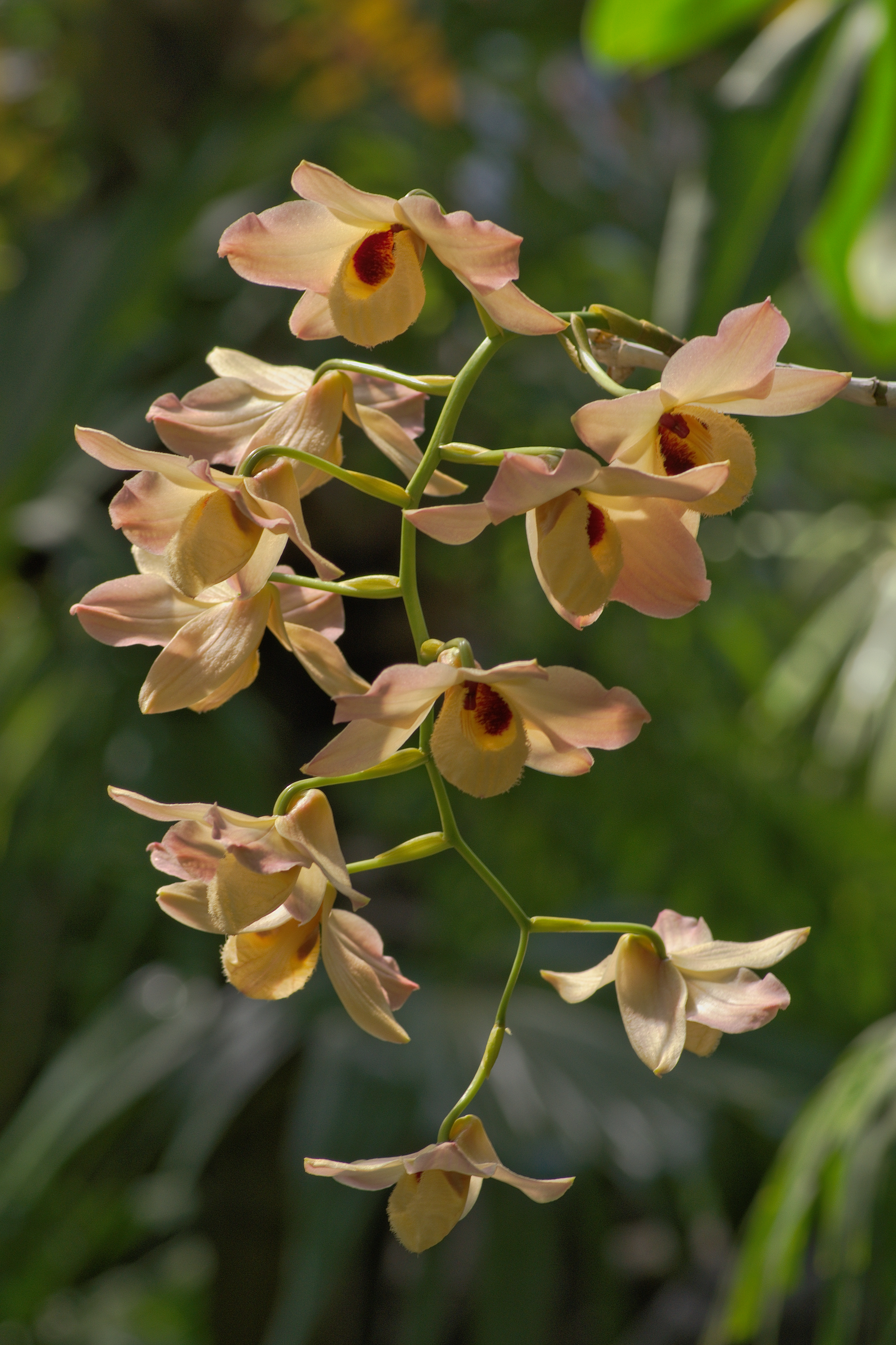

Scientific classification
- Kingdom: Plantae
- Clade: Tracheophytes
- Clade: Angiosperms
- Clade: Monocots
- Order: Asparagales
- Family: Orchidaceae
- Subfamily: Epidendroideae
- Genus: Dendrobium
- Species: D. moschatum

Binomial name
- Dendrobium moschatum (Banks) Sw.

Synonyms
- Epidendrum moschatum Buch.-Ham. (basionym); Cymbidium moschatum (Buch.-Ham.) Willd.; Dendrobium calceolaria Carey ex Hook.; Dendrobium moschatum Wall. ex D.Don, illegitimate; Dendrobium cupreum Herb. ex Lindl.; Thicuania moschata (Buch.-Ham.) Raf.; Callista moschata (Buch.-Ham.) Kuntze; Callista calceola (Carey ex Hook.) Kuntze; Dendrobium moschatum var. unguipetalum I.Barua

= Dendrobium moschatum =

Musky-smelling dendrobium

Species of orchid

Dendrobium moschatum Griff. is a synonym of Dendrobium pulchellum.

Dendrobium moschatum, the musky-smelling dendrobium, is a species of orchid. It is native to the Himalayas (northern and eastern India, northern Bangladesh, Nepal, Bhutan, Assam, Yunnan), and Indochina (Vietnam, Thailand, Myanmar, Laos, Cambodia).

Plicatol B is a phenanthrene that can be isolated from Dendrobium moschatum.
