= Bulbophyllum kwangtungense =

Scientific classification
- Kingdom: Plantae
- Clade: Tracheophytes
- Clade: Angiosperms
- Clade: Monocots
- Order: Asparagales
- Family: Orchidaceae
- Subfamily: Epidendroideae
- Genus: Bulbophyllum
- Species: B. kwangtungense

Binomial name
- Bulbophyllum kwangtungense Schltr.

Species of orchid

Bulbophyllum kwangtungense is a species of orchid in the genus Bulbophyllum.

Cumulatin, densiflorol A and plicatol B are chemicals that can be isolated from the orchid.
