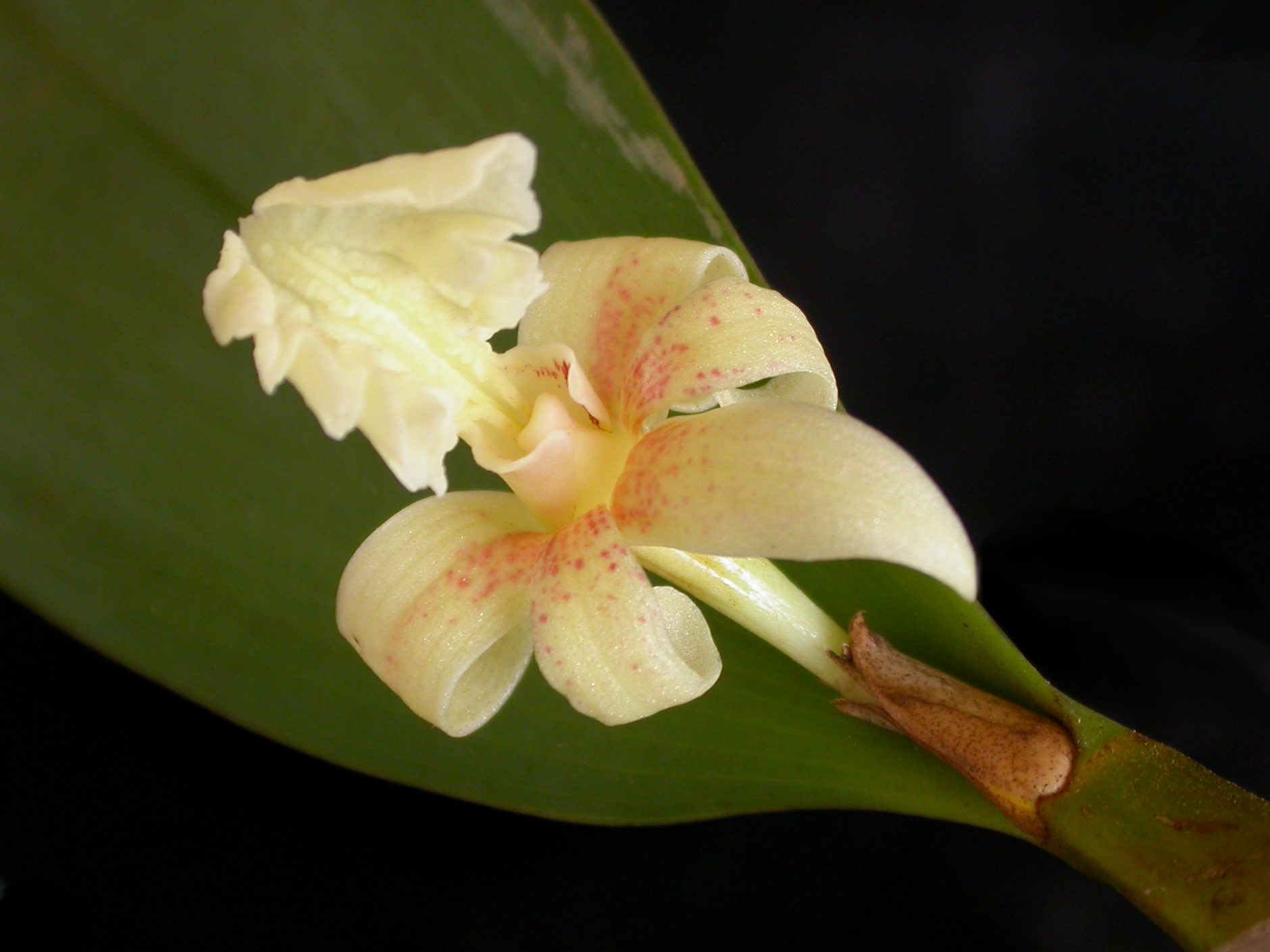

Scientific classification
- Kingdom: Plantae
- Clade: Tracheophytes
- Clade: Angiosperms
- Clade: Monocots
- Order: Asparagales
- Family: Orchidaceae
- Subfamily: Epidendroideae
- Genus: Dendrobium
- Species: D. plicatile

Binomial name
- Dendrobium plicatile Lindl.

Synonyms
- Callista binnendykii (Rchb.f.) Kuntze 1891; Callista flabella [Rchb.f]Kuntze 1891; Callista kunstleri (Hook.f.) Kuntze 1891; Dendrobium binnendijkii Rchb.f. 1865; Dendrobium fimbriatum [Bl.] Lindl. 1830; Dendrobium flabellum Rchb.f 1857; Dendrobium insulare Steudel 1840; Dendrobium kunstleri Hook.f. 1890; Dendrobium mentosum Schltr. 1911; Dendrobium rabanii Lindl.; Desmotrichum binnendijkii (Rchb.f.) Kraenzl. 1910; Desmotrichum fimbriatum Blume 1825; Desmotrichum kunstleri (Hook.f.) Kraenzl. 1910; Ephemerantha fimbriata (Blume) P.F. Hunt & Summerh. 1961; Ephemerantha kunstleri (Hook.f.) P.F.Hunt & Summerh. 1961; Flickingeria binnendijkii (Rchb.f.) A.D.Hawkes 1965; Flickingeria fimbriata (Blume) A.D.Hawkes, Orquídea (Rio de Janeiro) 27: 303 (1965); Flickingeria kunstleri (Hook.f.) A.D.Hawkes 1965; Flickingeria rabanii (Lindl.) Seidenf.

= Dendrobium plicatile =

Species of orchid

Dendrobium plicatile is an Asian orchid species, a member of the genus Dendobium. It was formerly described as Flickingeria fimbriata.

== Distribution ==
The orchid's native regions include Southeast Asia, the Himalayas, and Malesia.

It is found in Borneo, Cambodia, South and Central China, Hainan, Himalayas East, India ( Assam), Java, Laos, Nusa Tenggara islands, Malaya, Nepal, Nicobar Islands, Philippines, Sulawesi, Sumatera, Thailand, and Vietnam.

== Description ==
The methanol extract of D. plicatile has been shown to scavenge the superoxide anion radical ·O_{2}^{−}. Flower extracts from the closely related species Dendrobium officinale have also been proven to reduce fatty liver disease, oxidative stress, and inflammation, protecting against alcohol-induced liver injury.

From the stems, three phenanthrenes can be isolated, named plicatol A, B and C.

The plant also contains the norditerpenoids named flickinflimilins A and B and steroids.
