= Plicatol C =

Names
- Other names 2,5,9-Trihydroxy-4-methoxy-9,10-dihydrophenanthrene

Identifiers
CAS Number	278608-08-5
3D model (JSmol)	Interactive image
ChemSpider	72867480
PubChem CID	53814710
CompTox Dashboard (EPA)	DTXSID801031826
- InChI: InChI=1S/C15H14O4/c1-19-13-7-9(16)5-8-6-12(18)10-3-2-4-11(17)15(10)14(8)13/h2-5,7,12,16-18H,6H2,1H3 Key: FRNDIOQCIXBSFC-UHFFFAOYSA-N
- SMILES: OC3Cc2cc(O)cc(OC)c2-c1c3cccc1O

Properties
Chemical formula	C_{15}H_{14}O_{4}
Molar mass	258.273 g·mol^{−1}
- Except where otherwise noted, data are given for materials in their standard state (at 25 °C [77 °F], 100 kPa). Infobox references

Plicatol C is one of the three phenanthrenes that can be isolated from the stems of the orchid Dendrobium plicatile.

== See also ==
- Plicatol A
- Plicatol B
