= Plicatol B =

Names
- Preferred IUPAC name 4-Methoxyphenanthrene-2,5-diol
- Other names Moscatin; 2,5-Dihydroxy-4-methoxyphenanthrene

Identifiers
CAS Number	108335-06-4
3D model (JSmol)	Interactive image
ChemSpider	168975
PubChem CID	194774
UNII	FUC1N75GST
CompTox Dashboard (EPA)	DTXSID90148506
- InChI: InChI=1S/C15H12O3/c1-18-13-8-11(16)7-10-6-5-9-3-2-4-12(17)14(9)15(10)13/h2-8,16-17H,1H3 Key: LVOCAIKGDCMNNK-UHFFFAOYSA-N; InChI=1/C15H12O3/c1-18-13-8-11(16)7-10-6-5-9-3-2-4-12(17)14(9)15(10)13/h2-8,16-17H,1H3 Key: LVOCAIKGDCMNNK-UHFFFAOYAI
- SMILES: c2ccc(O)c1c2ccc3c1c(OC)cc(O)c3

Properties
Chemical formula	C_{15}H_{12}O_{3}
Molar mass	240.258 g·mol^{−1}
- Except where otherwise noted, data are given for materials in their standard state (at 25 °C [77 °F], 100 kPa). Infobox references

Plicatol B is one of the three phenanthrenes that can be isolated from the stems of the orchid Flickingeria fimbriata. It can also be isolated from Dendrobium densiflorum, D. loddigesii, D. moschatum, D. rotundatum and Bulbophyllum kwangtungense

== See also ==
- Plicatol A
- Plicatol C
