= Indra Chandra Shastri =

Writer

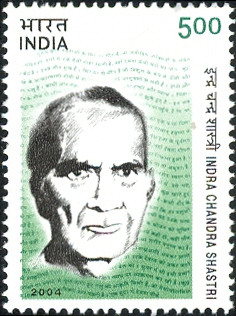
Indra Chandra Shastri on a 2004 stamp of India

Indra Chandra Shastri was an Indian writer and philosopher from Bikaner in Rajasthan state in India. The government of India issued a postage stamp in his honour.
