= Dendrobium chryseum =

Scientific classification
- Kingdom: Plantae
- Clade: Tracheophytes
- Clade: Angiosperms
- Clade: Monocots
- Order: Asparagales
- Family: Orchidaceae
- Subfamily: Epidendroideae
- Genus: Dendrobium
- Species: D. chryseum

Binomial name
- Dendrobium chryseum Rolfe

Synonyms
- List: Aporum rivesii (Gagnep.) Rauschert; Callista aurantiaca Kuntze; Dendrobium aurantiacum Rchb.f.; Dendrobium aurantiacum var. zhaojuense (S.C.Sun & L.G.Xu) Z.H.Tsi; Dendrobium chryseum var. bulangense G.X.Ma & G.J.Xu; Dendrobium chryseum var. zhaojuense (S.C.Sun & L.G.Xu) J.M.H.Shaw; Dendrobium clavatum var. aurantiacum (Kuntze) Tang & F.T.Wang; Dendrobium flaviflorum Hayata; Dendrobium rivesii Gagnep.; Dendrobium tibeticum Schltr.; Dendrobium zhaojuense S.C.Sun & L.G.Xu

Species of plant

Dendrobium chryseum is a species of flowering plant in the family Orchidaceae. It is native to the Himalayas, mainland South East Asia, south-central China, and Taiwan. It is one of over 1,600 species in the genus Dendrobium.

An epiphyte with yellow flowers, it grows on tree trunks in broadleaf forests at elevations from 1,700 to 2,600 m (5,600 to 8,500 ft). It is considered sacred by the Tsou people of the mountains of Taiwan, who use it to decorate the roofs of their men's traditional meeting houses.
