= Plicatol A =

Names
- Preferred IUPAC name 4,9,10-Trimethoxyphenanthrene-2,5-diol
- Other names 2,5-Dihydroxy-4,9,10-trimethoxyphenanthrene

Identifiers
CAS Number	278605-75-7
3D model (JSmol)	Interactive image
ChEMBL	ChEMBL438339
ChemSpider	23311193
PubChem CID	44445445
UNII	B42H8CY2UC
CompTox Dashboard (EPA)	DTXSID101031825
- InChI: InChI=1S/C17H16O5/c1-20-13-8-9(18)7-11-15(13)14-10(5-4-6-12(14)19)16(21-2)17(11)22-3/h4-8,18-19H,1-3H3 Key: DRZYTLJQXLHYME-UHFFFAOYSA-N; InChI=1/C17H16O5/c1-20-13-8-9(18)7-11-15(13)14-10(5-4-6-12(14)19)16(21-2)17(11)22-3/h4-8,18-19H,1-3H3 Key: DRZYTLJQXLHYME-UHFFFAOYAS
- SMILES: COC1=C2C(=CC(=C1)O)C(=C(C3=C2C(=CC=C3)O)OC)OC

Properties
Chemical formula	C_{17}H_{16}O_{5}
Molar mass	300.310 g·mol^{−1}
- Except where otherwise noted, data are given for materials in their standard state (at 25 °C [77 °F], 100 kPa). Infobox references

Plicatol A is one of the three phenanthrenes that can be isolated from the stems of the orchid Dendrobium plicatile.

== See also ==
- Plicatol B
- Plicatol C
