= Kuber Nath Rai =

Indian writer and scholar (1933–1996)

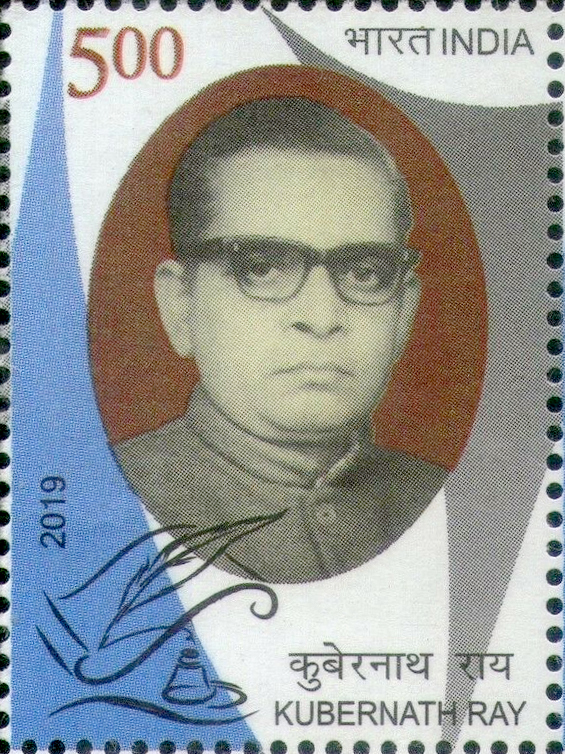
- Rai on a 2019 stamp of India
- Born: 26 March 1933; Matsa Village, Dildarnagar Kamsar, Ghazipur, United Provinces, British India
- Died: 5 June 1996 (aged 63)
- Occupations: Writer, essayist, scholar, poet
- Writing career
- Notable works: Gandha Madan, Priya neel-kanti, Ras Aakhetak, Vishad Yog
- Notable awards: Bharatiya Jnanpith

Kuber Nath Rai (26 March 1933 – 5 June 1996), also written as Kubernath Ray and Kuber Nath Ray, was a writer and scholar of Hindi literature and Sanskrit.

== Early life ==
Kuber Nath Rai was born in Matsa village of Ghazipur district in Uttar Pradesh, India. His father's name was Vakunth Narayan Rai. He got his early education at village Matsa. However he did his matriculation from Queen's College, Varanasi. For higher studies he got enrolled in Banaras Hindu University (BHU). He did his masters in English Literature from Calcutta University. As an academician he started his career with Vikram Vishvavidyalaya but after a short period he moved to Nalbari, Assam as a lecturer of English literature. He retired from Swami Sahajanand Mahavidyalaya as its principal.

== Career ==
=== Teaching career ===
From 1958 to 1986 he was in Nalbari College, Assam as a lecturer in English Department. From 1986 to 1995 he was in Swami Sahajanand Saraswati PG College, Ghazipur, UP as a Principal. He got the Moortidevi Award from Bharatiya gyanpith and many awards from UP, WB and Assam Government.

=== Writing career ===
Kuber Nath Rai dedicated his writing entirely to the form of the essay.

His collections of essays Gandha Madan, Priya neel-kanti, Ras Aakhetak, Vishad Yog, Nishad Bansuri, Parna mukut have enriched the form of essay. A scholar of Indian culture and western literature, he was reverent towards Indian heritage. His love for natural beauty, Indian folk literatures, preference for agricultural society over the age of machines, his romantic outlook, sensibility, his keen eye on contemporary reality and classical style place him very high among contemporary essayists in Hindi.

== Main works ==
- Andhkaar Mein Agnishikha, Prabhat Prakashan, ISBN 81-85826-61-7.
- Priya Neelkanthi, Bharatiya Jnanpith, 1969.
- Ras Aakhetak, Bharatiya Jnanpith, 1971.
- Gandhmaadan, Bharatiya Jnanpith, 1972.
- Nishad Bansuri, 1973.
- Vishad Yoga, National Publiśhiṅg Hause (Delhi), 1974.
- Parn mukut, Lok Bhāratī Prakāśana (Allāhābād), 1978.
- Mahakavi ki Tarjani, National Publiśhiṅg Hāuse (Delhi), 1979
- Patr:Maniputul ke naam, Viśvavidyālaya Prakāśana (Vārāṇasī), (1980) reprint 2004.
- Manpawan ki Nauka, Prabhāt Prakāśana (Delhi), 1983.
- Kirat nadi mein Chandramadhu, Viśvavidyālaya Prakāśana (Vārāṇasi), 1983.
- Dristi Abhisaar, National Publiśhiṅg Hāuse (New Delhi), 1984
- Treta ka vrihatsaam, National Publiśhiṅg Hāuse (New Delhi), 1986.
- Kaamdhenu, Rājapal& Sons (Delhi), 1990.
- Maraal, Bharatiya Jnanpith, 1993.
- Agam ki Nav
- Vani ka kshirsagar
- Ramayana Mahateertham, Bharatiya Jnanpith (New Delhi), 2002
- Kanthamani (Kavya Sangrah), Viśvavidyālaya Prakāśana, (Vārāṇasī), 1998
- Uttarkuru, 1993.
- Cinmaya Bhārata: ārsha-cintana ke buniyādī sūtra, Hindustānī Academy, (Allahabad), 1996

== Anthologies of essays ==
- Kuberanātha Rāya ke pratinidhi nibandha, Sāhitya Bhavana (Allahabad), 1991
- Kuber Nath Rai Sanchayan, Sahitya Academy

== See also ==
- List of Indian writers
- Sitakant Mahapatra
- Tapan Kumar Pradhan
- Odisha Public Service Commission

== Works on Rai ==
- Rajiv Ranjan, 'Bhartiyata Ki Sankalpana Aur Kuber Nath Rai' (2009) Dept. Of Lit. Mahatma Gandhi Anatrrashtriya Hindi Vishwavidyalaya, Wardha Maharashtra
- Kuber Nath Rai: Parichay Aur Pahchan, Rajiv Ranjan,2014, Ashish Prakashan Kanpur, ISBN 9788189457891
- DR. Ajay RAI, "Lalit Nibandh Parampara Aur Kubre Nath Rai" V.B.S Purvanchal University , Jaunpur, U.P.
- Sankar Chandak, Kuber Nath Rai Ke Nibandhan Ka Swaroop Aur Shilpa Vidhan. V.B.S Purvanchal University , Jaunpur, U.P., 2001.
- Vishwanath Prasad Tiwari, Bhartiya Sahitya ke Nirmata, Kubernath Rai, Sahitya Akademi, New Delhi (2007)ISBN 81-260-2523-9
- Aman Mohindra;Kubernath Rai ke Lalit Nibandhon Ka Saanskritik Vishleshan, Punjabi University, Patiala.2003
- Suresh Maheshwari, Lalit Nibandhakar Kuberanath Ray: Vyaktitva-Krtitva Ki Lalit Alocana, Bhavana Prakasana; 1st edition (1999), ISBN 81-7667-000-6
