= Hanagal Kumaraswamiji =

Indian saint

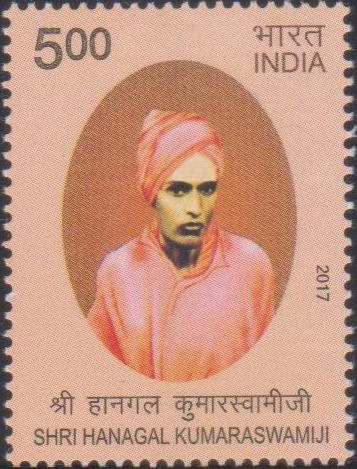
Kumaraswamiji on a 2017 stamp of India

Kumaraswamiji of Hanagal (11 September 1867 – 1930) was an Indian saint and the founder of All India Veerashaiva Mahasabha. A kannada movie Viratpura Viragi - A biopic based on Shri Hangalla Kumareshwara directed by B. S. Lingadevaru, depicts immensely wonderful contributions to the society made by Shri Hangalla Kumareshwara

== Early life ==
Shri Kumaraswamiji was born in Joyisara Haralahalli village of Haveri district to the couple Basavayya and Smt. Neelamma into a pious family. His first name was Halayya. He was brilliant at the school. He showed more interest in spiritual aspects at a tender age. By the time he was in 7th standard, his mind completely turned to spirituality.

== Spiritual life ==
Shri Kumaraswamiji chose renunciation for his spiritual endurance under the guidance of Siddaroodha Swamiji of Siddaroodha Math in Hubballi. He spent 12 years meditating in a cave near Mysuru before returning to North Karnataka. He also served the Hanagal Virakta Math as a monk.

== Notable works ==
- He established All India Veerashaiva Mahasabha in 1904.
- He also established Shivayoga Mandira in 1909.
- He also established Goshala to protect and shelter the cows which still runs today. It symbolises his love towards animals.

== Efforts ==
He encouraged Indians to choose Khadi during British period in India by wearing Khadi. He also made Yoga compulsory in his institution for all Sanyasis. It symbolises his concern for healthy living.

== Recognition ==
- India Post released a commemorative postage stamp on 19 May 2017 on the occasion of his 150th birth anniversary celebration.
- B.V.V. Sangha has named its hospital after his name who pioneered treating the ill with herbal medicines as Hanagal Shree Kumareshwar Hospital and Research Centre in Bagalkot.
- A film named Viratapura Viragi has been produced based on the life story of Shri Hanagal Kumara Shivayogi.
