= Mathew M. Kuzhiveli =

Indian children's writer and publisher (1905-1974)

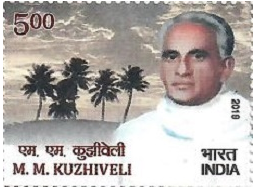
- commemorative postage stamp released in honor of Mathew M. Kuzhiveli
- Born: April 20, 1905; Pala, Travancore, British India (present-day Kottayam district, Kerala)
- Died: October 27, 1974 (aged 69); Thiruvananthapuram, Kerala
- Citizenship: Travancore (1905–1947); India (1947–1974)
- Occupations: children's writer and publisher
- Writing career
- Notable work: Vijnjanam (first Malayalam encyclopedia)
- Notable awards: Kerala Sahitya Akademi Fellowship; Padma Shri (posthumously)

Mathew M. Kuzhiveli is an Indian teacher, educationalist, publisher, children's writer, and the first encyclopedia author in Malayalam. He received the Kerala Sahitya Akademi Fellowship and the Padma Shri (posthumously). In 2019, India Post has honored him by releasing a commemorative postage stamp.

== Biography ==
Mathew M. Kuzhiveli was born on April 20, 1905, at Pala in present-day Kottayam district of Kerala. He was born in Kuzhiveli family, which was one of the founding families of the Pala Lalam Old Church, to Mathai Kuzhiveli and Maria. He studied at Pala St. Thomas School and Changanassery S.B. College. He later completed an L.T. Degree from the Government Training College, Thiruvanthapuram. He was also studied at University of Madras.

After studies, Kuzhiveli became a teacher at Pala St. Thomas High School and later, he became the headmaster of St. Thomas Training School there. At that time, he also published a magazine called School Master from Pala.

Later, when the Travancore University (now Kerala University) was established, Mathew M. Kuzhiveli became the head of the Publications Department there. There was even an attempt to take disciplinary action against him for being willing to publish a language encyclopedia on his own without asking permission from the authorities while he was working at the university.

Kuzhiveli held several important positions including Deputy Director of Kerala University Publications (1942–48), the first Text Books Officer of the Travancore–Cochin state (1950–1952), Extension Education Officer of Kerala University (1957–1959), Member of Text Book Committee formed by Kerala Government, Senator of Kerala University and Convenor of different Committees on Education. He retired from service in 1962 as the Director of Publications Department, Kerala University.

Kuzhiveli died on October 27, 1974.

=== Personal life ===
Kuzhiveli was married to Annamma of Angamaly Parakkal family. They had four boys and five girls. He gave the name Balan, the name of one of his sons, to his children's literature publishing venture.

== Literary contributions ==
Kuzhuveli founded the publishing house Balan in 1941 in Thiruvananthapuram, and published about three hundred books in the genre children's literature, along with a periodical for children titled Balan. He also wrote about sixty books himself. The books were written in four categories according to the age of the children. He also took care to include various scientific disciplines in all categories. Balan Publishing House stopped functioning after Kuzhiveli's death in 1974.

Kuzhiveli has also written around sixty works. Important works he has written include Adhunika Kandupiduthangal [meaning:Modern Inventions], Everestarohanam [meaning:Everest Climbing], Shanta Tharam [meaning:peaceful star], Adhunika vidyabhyasam [meaning :Modern Education], Charthra Bodhanam [meaning:Historical Education], and an 8-volume encyclopedia titled Vijnjanam [meaning: Knowledge].

Vijnjanam was considered as the first encyclopedia in the Malayalam language. It contains 1622 entries and 1603 pictures in 10376 pages. Unlike other encyclopaedias that time, his encyclopedia has been written in the form of essays covering different topics.

The first volume of the encyclopedia was formally released by the then ruler of Thiru-Cochin, Sree Chithira Thirunal Maharaja, in 1956 at the Kawadiyar Palace in the presence of his mother, Amma Maharani, his daughter Karthika Thirunal, and Colonel Godavarma Raja. In 1972, the then Indian President V. V. Giri formally released the remaining volumes of the encyclopedia, and the then Governor V. Viswanathan presided over the event.

In his book Prachina Kerala Vidhyabhyasam [meaning: Ancient Kerala education] published in 1956, he wrote about the history of Kerala education methods of education, types of institutions etc.

While in Thiruvananthapuram, he continued to publish an English magazine called Trivandrum Letters and a Malayalam publication called Kuzhiveli Patrika.

== Awards and honors ==
Kuzhiveli has received the Kerala Sahitya Akademi Fellowship and the Padma Shri (posthumously), one of the highest civilian awards given by the Government of India.

On November 22, 2019, India Post honored M.M. Kuzhiveli by releasing a commemorative postage stamp in his memory. The Pala Municipality has paid tribute to him by naming the Municipal Library in Pala as the Padmashri Mathew M. Kuzhiveli Memorial Library.
