= T. V. Sambasivam Pillai =

Indian traditional medicine expert (1880–1953)

- டி. வி. சாம்பசிவம் பிள்ளை
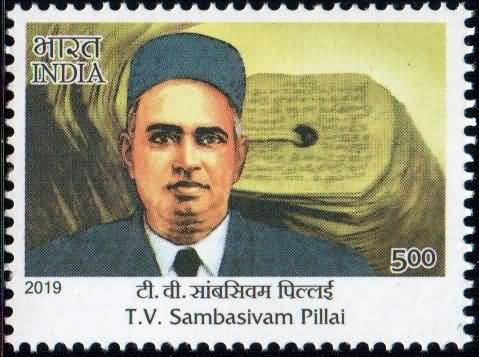
- Commemorative 2019 five-rupee stamp issued in memory of Pillai
- Born: 19 September 1880; Bengaluru, Karnataka, India
- Died: 12 November 1953 (aged 73)
- Occupation: Scholar of Siddha medicine
- Notable work: Tamil-English Dictionary of Medicine, Chemistry, Botany and Allied Sciences
- Spouses: Duraikannu Ammal (m. 1903–1914); Ammani Ammal (m. 1916–1917)
- Children: 5

Tanjore Vilviah Sambasivam Pillai (Tamil: டி. வி. சாம்பசிவம் பிள்ளை, 19 September 1880 – 12 November 1953) was a Tamil scholar. He was best known for the Tamil-English Dictionary of Medicine, Chemistry, Botany, and Allied Sciences, a reference work in Siddha medicine.

== Biography ==
Pillai was born on 19 September 1880 in Bangalore. He was the eldest son of Vilviah Manniar and Manonmani Ammal. His family was from the village of Kamuganchenthangudi, near Tanjore, and later migrated to Bangalore. A plague outbreak in Bangalore eventually led his family to return to their village.

Pillai completed his education in Bangalore and was later appointed as a clerk in the Chennai City Police Commissioner's office.

In 1903, he married Duraikannu Ammal, with whom he had five sons; all of whom died in childhood due to unknown causes. Duraikannu Ammal died in 1914 due to cholera. In 1916, Pillai remarried, this time to Ammani Ammal, who died in 1917 during childbirth. After these personal losses, Pillai shifted his focus to studying Siddha medicine despite not having formal medical training.

During his studies, he recognized the absence of an authoritative English reference in Siddha medicine, which motivated him to compile the Tamil-English Dictionary of Medicine, Chemistry, Botany, and Allied Sciences. The dictionary was published in volumes, some of which were released posthumously.

In recognition of his work, in 1949, the Government of Tamil Nadu, University of Madras and University of Mysore sanctioned 5000 rupees each as financial assistance for his research and accommodation at Triplicane, Chennai.

Pillai died on 12 November 1953.

On 30 August 2019, the Government of India issued a commemorative five-rupee stamp in the "Masters of AYUSH" series, recognizing the services of twelve modern masters of Indian systems of medicine, which included him.

== Works ==
Pillai spent nearly 16 years collecting material for the Tamil-English Dictionary of Medicine, Chemistry, Botany, and Applied Sciences. In 1938, he compiled and published two volumes of his work at his own expense, but could only partially publish the third volume. The remaining part was published with assistance from the Government of Tamil Nadu. The fourth and fifth volumes were published in 1977 and 1978, respectively by G. D. Naidu and his son G. D. N. Gopal.

Pillai's dictionary provides information about plants, minerals, metals, and animals used in Siddha medicine. Consisting of five volumes, it spans 6,537 pages and contains nearly 80,000 words. The work provides translations for Tamil words in English and describes and explains each word with appropriate annotations.

The dictionary was renamed The Greatness of Siddha Medicine and was published at the second World Tamil Research Conference, held in Chennai in 1968. The dictionary is cited in academic research related to Siddha medicine and Tamil literature.

Tamil-English Dictionary of Medicine, Chemistry, Botany and Allied Sciences
Volumes	Part	Publisher, year	Pages	Description
I	I	Research Institute of Siddhars Science, 1938	880	It covers Tamil letters: A, Aa, and I (3 letters). 240 pages are occupied by a forward, containing research material under 27 headings. These include the topics "macrocosm vs. microcosm", "astrology in medicine", "eastern physiology", "the five elements", "humoral pathology", "science of breath", "Prana", "science of pulse", "diseases and their cure", "ancient chemistry", "alchemy", "rejuvenation", "immortality", "the ethics of a good physician", and others.
I	II	Research Institute of Siddhars Science, 1938	862	It covers Tamil letters: i, ee, u, oo, e, ae, i, o, oa, ou (10 letters).
II	I	Research Institute of Siddhars Science, 1938	800	It covers Tamil letters: Ka, Kaa (2 letters). This volume consists of dictionary content from ‘Ka' to ‘Kow' in the Tamil alphabet, with 774 pages.
II	II	Research Institute of Siddhars Science, 1938	536	It covers Tamil letters: 'Ki' to 'Kou' (10 letters). This volume consists of dictionary content from the letters ‘Ka' to ‘Kow' in the Tamil alphabet, with 774 pages.
III	-	The Directorate of Indian Medicine, 1977	472	It covers Tamil letters: Sa, saa, si (3 letters). This volume consists of dictionary content from the letters ‘Cha' to ‘Chi' in the Tamil alphabet, with 774 pages.
IV	I	The Directorate of Indian Medicine, 1977	1020	It covers the 'Si-sow, nja' series, 'da' series to 'tha, thaa' (36 letters). This volume consists of dictionary content from 'Si' to 'Now' in the Tamil alphabet. It was published posthumously.
IV	II	The Directorate of Indian Medicine, 1978	980	It covers the 'Thi-thow' to 'Nha' series (22 letters). This volume consists of dictionary content from 'Si' to 'Now' in the Tamil alphabet. It was published posthumously.
V	-	The Directorate of Indian Medicine, 1978	1292	It covers the 'Pa' series to 'Nau' series (120 letters). This volume consists of dictionary content from 'Pa' to 'Jo' in the Tamil alphabet.
