= Raghavan Thirumulpad =

Ayurvedic scholar and practitioner (1920–2010)

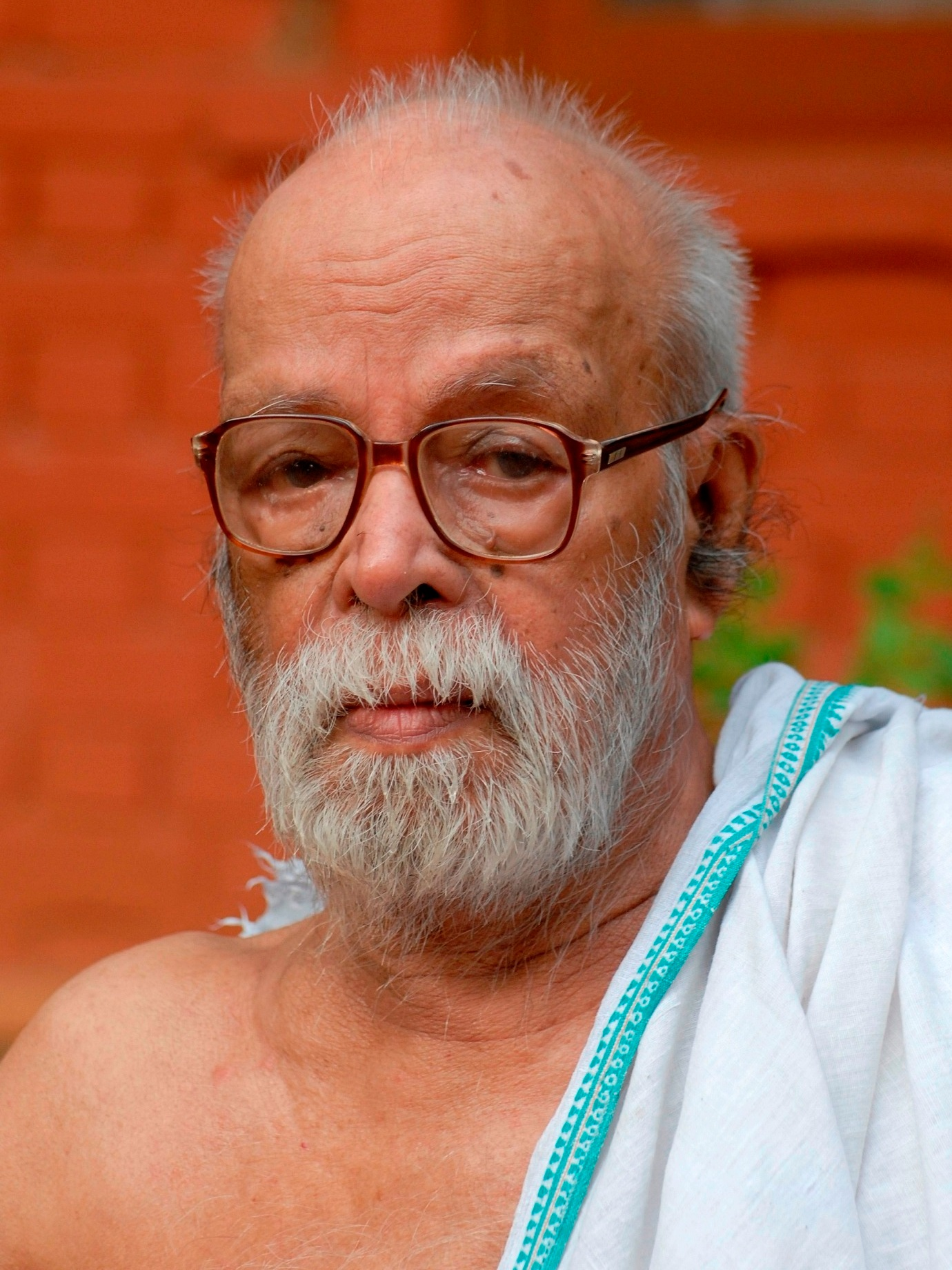
- Raghavan Thirumulpad in 2007
- Born: 20 May 1920; Chingoli, Alappuzha District, Kerala, India
- Died: 21 November 2010 (aged 90); Chalakudy, India
- Occupation: Ayurvedic scholar
- Spouse: Visalakshi Thamburatty

Vaidyabhooshanam K. Raghavan Thirumulpad (20 May 1920 – 21 November 2010) was an Ayurvedic scholar and practitioner.

Thirumulpad studied Sanskrit, Tharkam (Indian philosophy), Jyothisham (Indian astrology) and Vyakarana (grammar) under various teachers. Later he studied Ayurveda under P. Vasudevan Nambisan and passed the graduation exam called Vaidyabhooshanam. From a young age he was attracted by Gandhian thought and living and began using and propagating Khadi (the hand-woven cotton fabric which once symbolised Indian nationalism).

Raghavan Thirumulpad was influenced by Ruskin's essay, Unto This Last, and tried to implement its ethos in his day-to-day practice of medicine. This was a shift in the trend of ayurvedic practice that prevailed all over India in that time. He gave more stress to life-style modifications in his treatment and the least importance was given to medicine. Maximum stress was laid on the importance of physical exercise in the prevention of diseases. He promoted a style highlighting wholesome food, sound sleep, moderated sex and optimal exercise. Thirumulpad taught a number of young ayurvedic graduates to practise ayurveda in a more logical scientific but simple style. He resided at Chalakudy.

V.K.R.T. Foundation, consisting of his students, celebrated his 90th birthday on 23 May 2010, at Chalakudy as "Navathi Pranamam", nine of his books were released.

On 25 January 2011, the Ayurveda Acharyan was posthumously awarded Padma Bhushan, two months after his death.

Chalakudy Municipality commemorated the second anniversary of his death with a meeting at the Merchants Association hall, Chalakudy, Kerala, India on 21 November 2012. A special award was given to Dr. M. Prasad, for his contributions for propagating the ideologies of K. Raghavan Thirumulpad.

== Personal life ==
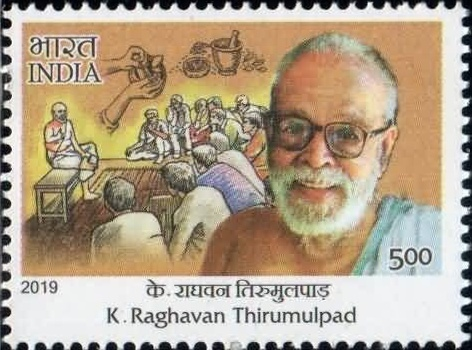
Raghavan Thirumulpad on a 2019 stamp of India

Sri. Thirumulpad was married to Visalakshi Thampuratty, and has four sons Dr. Murali, Mukundan, Murari, Ravivarma and a daughter Dr. Muthulakshmy who is a Sanskrit Professor, writer and currently the Pro-Vice Chancellor at Sree Sankara University of Sanskrit, Kalady and is a recipient of Kerala Sahitya Academy Award for translation for 2008. His wife predeceased him in January 2009.

== Related Links ==
http://www.thirumulpad.com/
