= Bhaskar Vishwananth Ghokale =

Indian educator, activist, and philosopher

Bhaskar Vishwanath Gokhale
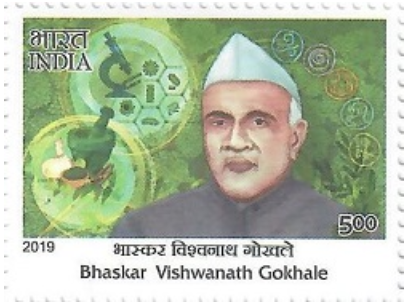
- Commemorative Stamps Issued by India Post in 2019

Personal life
- Born: 19 April 1903 Kolhapur, Maharastra, India.
- Occupation: Guru, Freedom Fighter, Reformer, Member of Parliament and activist

Religious life
- Religion: Hinduism

Bhaskar Vishwanath Gokhale (19 April 1903 – 12 January 1962), also known as Vaidya Bhaskar Vishwanath Gokhale, and popularly called Mama Gokhaleji, was an Indian Ayurveda practitioner, Ayurvedic teacher, freedom fighter, and philosopher.

== Life ==
Bhaskar Vishwananth Gokhale was born on 19 April 1903 in Kolhapur (Maharashtra). His father, Vishwanath Gokhale, was a judge, and Bhaskar was the youngest of his children. His mother, Parvati Gokhale, died at an early age.

After he finished school in Kolhapur, Gokhale moved to Mumbai for further studies. He enrolled in the National Medical College, which supported the non-cooperation movement against the British Raj. When the college withdrew its support for the Indian independence movement, he left to support of the movement and was imprisoned three times (1924, 1928, and 1932). In 1924, Gokhale joined Tilak Ayurveda Mahavidyalaya in Pune. In 1928, he became Ayurveda Visharada, completed his postgraduate work and later was the first to earn the degree of Ayurveda Parangata in 1937. In 1942, he participated in the Quit India Movement and was imprisoned for two years.

After the death of Vaidya Purushottam Shastri Nanal, Gokhale worked as the chief physician of Tarachand Ramnath Hospital in Pune. In 1946, he became the principal of Tilak Ayurveda Vidyalaya, and wrote three books, two of which (Dosha Dhatu Mala Vidnyana and Vikruti Vidnyana) give insights into Ayurveda. His other book, Chikitsapradeep, is a reference book for Ayurvedic students. He was also the head of Tilak Ayurveda Mahavidyalaya and Seth Tarachand Ramnath Hospital for over 20 years. In 1956, Gokhale became the first principal of the postgraduate institute at Jamnagar.

In 1960, the Maharashtra government inducted him as President of the State Board and Chairman of the State Faculty of Ayurvedic and Unani Medicine.

== Contributions to Ayurveda ==
- His vision of creating Ayurveda scientists is often mentioned in his books and articles. His idea constitutes advances of the educational system into Ayurvedic studies without compromising shastric standards. He envisioned scientific use and development of formulations that were not available in traditional Ayurveda books and increasing potency of routinely used drugs. He has introduced the use of Kajjali (black sulphide of mercury) in different formulations.
- Practically demonstrated the use of Parpaties (flake-like preparation consisting of Parada, Gandhaka (sulphur) and other drugs) in various Annavaha Strotovikrutis (Diseases of Gastrointestinal tract).
- Ekaushadhi Prayoga, an experiment in which Gokhale identified the efficacy of a single drug which made the therapy more accurate. This encouraged further research in pharmacology.
- Gokhale's students wrote about him in Ayurved Bhaskar, which discusses special cases he treated, the logic behind his treatment, his conclusions, his experiences and his teaching skills.
- In a small book written in Marathi, Ayurved Mhanaje kay?("आयुर्वेद म्हणजे काय?") ("What Do You Mean by Ayurveda?"), Gokhale discussed the origin and purpose of Ayurveda as a health science, the causes for deterioration of Ayurveda, and the means required for its renaissance. He also emphasized the quality of postgraduate education and research in Ayurveda and advised his students to learn about recent advances in biomedical science. Gokhale was a hard critic of colleges with substandard education quality.
- Contributions to Ayurveda Rasashala transformed the institute to an internationally reputed Ayurveda pharmacy.
- Strong principles for the betterment of Ayurvedic education, including his refusal of governmental grants that forced rules on the institute and integration.
- Physicians of modern system of medicine sought his second opinion and referred patients to him for Ayurvedic treatment.
- Emphasised Panchakarma Chikitsa (Ayurvedic techniques to eliminate toxic elements) in treatment, as Shamana Chikitsa alone is not always useful in complicated conditions. Gokhale insisted on the proper analysis of factors such as Dosha, Dushya, Strotasa, Rugnabala, Vyadhibala, et al., which played a crucial role in determining the use of Shodhana Chikitsa. The Panchakarma department at Jamnagar, which Ghokale established, is now internationally recognized.
