= Gulabrao Maharaj =

Hindu saint from Maharashtra, India

Gulab Gondoji Mohod (पांडूरंगनाथ महाराज)
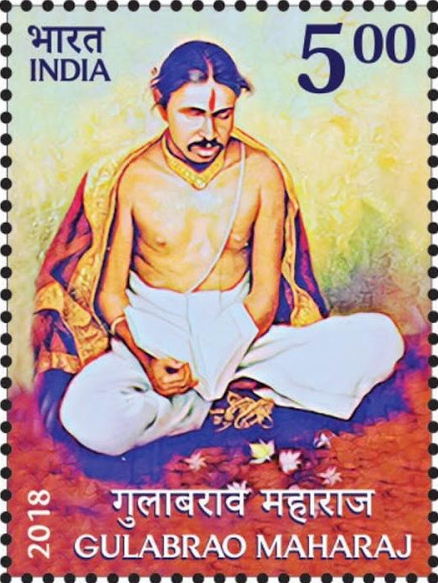
- Gulabrao Maharaj on a 2018 stamp of India

Personal life
- Born: Gulab Gondoji Mohod; 6 July 1881 Amravati, Maharashtra, India
- Died: 20 September 1915 (aged 34) Pune, India
- Notable work(s): 139 Grantha on different subjects written in Hindi, Marathi, Sanskrit
- Honors: Sant (Saint), Dev

Religious life
- Religion: Hinduism
- Philosophy: Adwaita, Varkari, Hinduism

Religious career
- Teacher: Dnyaneshwar

Gulabrao Maharaj (6 July 1881 – 20 September 1915) was a Hindu saint from Maharashtra, India. Despite being blind, he is credited with providing a spiritual and philosophical vision to people. During his lifetime of 34 years, he wrote 139 books on various subjects, comprising more than 6,000 pages, along with 130 commentaries and approximately 25,000 stanzas of poetry.

== Biography ==
=== Childhood ===
Gulabrao Maharaj was born on 6 July 1881 into a Maratha Kunbi family in Maharashtra, to Gonduji Mohod and Alokabai Mohod, originally from the village of Madhan near Amravati. His full name was Gulabrao Gundoji Mohod.

At the age of nine months, he lost his eyesight due to incorrect medication. When he was four years old, his mother died, after which he stayed with his maternal grandmother at Loni Takli for about six years.

He was often found in a state of samadhi during the night. Initially, his grandmother and others were frightened to see him sitting in a yogic posture with his respiration completely stopped. However, some elderly and knowledgeable individuals recognised his spiritual state and advised the family not to disturb him during samadhi.

He was fond of devotional songs (bhajans), sacred verses (shlokas), and reading occult literature. He would ask his friends to read aloud to him and would instantly repeat the contents. By the age of ten, he had acquired knowledge of the Vedas and Shastras.

=== Family tree ===
The Mohod family of Madhan, near Amravati, believed to have migrated from a region near the Gujarat–Rajasthan border in the 11th century. At that time, the family carried the surname 'Mohite', which was later changed to 'Mohod'.

=== Early life ===
At the age of 19, Sant Dnyaneshwar is believed to have given Gulabrao Maharaj a divine vision (drushtant) along with a mantra of his own name. Following this vision, the first portrait of Sant Dnyaneshwar was created by an artist under the directions of Gulabrao Maharaj; this portrait is still displayed at the Samadhi temple in Alandi, Maharashtra.

Gulabrao Maharaj was also known as "Pradnyachakshu Madhuradwaitacharya Gulabrao Maharaj". Although blind, he was called "Pradnyachakshu", meaning "one with intellectual sight" (from pradnya, meaning intelligence, and chakshu, meaning eyes in Sanskrit). He was considered a master of Vedanta philosophy as well as various occult and physical sciences. It is believed that he possessed divine powers, including the ability to acquire knowledge without the use of physical senses. He was said to be capable of mentally reading and comprehending any book in any language he wished to learn, without the need for his physical eyes.

Gulabrao Maharaj introduced a new school of thought known as "Madhuradvaita". In traditional Advaita Vedanta philosophy, the concept of non-dualism asserts that there is no distinction between the individual self and the supreme reality (Brahman), and that all forms and names are considered illusory. Advaita teaches that, "When everything has become one soul, where is another to smell? Who will see whom? Who will hear whom? Who will speak to whom? Who will think of whom? Who will know whom? How can one know the knower?" Thus, it holds that only Brahman exists and the world is an illusion (maya).

In contrast, "Madhurya Bhakti" refers to devotional love for Lord Krishna, involving a relationship between the devotee and the deity. While Advaita asserts that the devotee, devotion, and deity are ultimately the same, Madhurya Bhakti emphasises a sweet, personal relationship between the devotee and God.

It is believed that the saint who possessed eternal knowledge since childhood, due to providence and past karma, had advocated Madhurya Bhakti for the "post-realisation" stage to his disciple Gulabrao Maharaj.

=== Marriage ===
In 1896, Gulabrao Maharaj married Mankarnika, the daughter of Ganaji Bhuyar, a farmer from a nearby village.

=== Work ===
Although he had lost his eyesight at an early age, Gulabrao Maharaj wrote around 133 books on various subjects, comprising more than 6,000 pages, along with 130 commentaries and approximately 25,000 stanzas of poetry.

From 1897, at the age of sixteen, he began writing essays and poetry on religious philosophy. He would visit nearby cities, villages, and towns to meet people and discuss various religious topics. In 1901, it is believed that the 12th-century saint Sant Dnyaneshwar Maharaj spiritually met Gulabrao Maharaj and accepted him as his disciple. Gulabrao Maharaj often referred to himself as the wife of Lord Krishna and the daughter of Sant Dnyaneshwar. In 1905, he symbolically "married" Lord Krishna. He would dress and adorn himself like a woman, wearing ornaments, applying kumkum (a red mark) on his forehead, and wearing a mangalasutra (a sacred necklace worn by married Hindu women).

In 1902, at the age of 21, he wrote a commentary on the theories of Darwin and Spencer. He authored books on subjects such as dhyana (meditation), yoga, bhakti (devotion), and provided commentaries on ancient treatises. He also wrote Manas Ayurveda, which addresses the psychological aspects of Ayurveda.

He offered guidance to seekers aspiring for salvation and eternal knowledge. Despite being blind, he wrote on complex subjects such as Yoga, the Upanishads, Brahmasutras, and occult sciences, which are often challenging even for scholars. His writing style was unique and he presented his views while maintaining Vedic discipline. He also revealed many aspects of Hindu religious sciences that were not commonly discussed publicly by saints.

Although he belonged to the Kunbi caste, most of his disciples were Brahmins. He was believed to possess knowledge of the Vedas without formal study, due to his state of Atmadnyan (self-realisation). He was not bound by traditional orthodox rules and deeply respected the Vedas, Brahmanas, and ancient Indian religious texts. Known for his forthrightness, he would often defeat scholars and learned pundits in debates on the Shastras (scriptures).

=== Death ===
Gulabrao Maharaj died on 20 September 1915, at the age of 34. In India, it is often observed that individuals who dedicate their lives to the welfare of humanity are truly recognised and appreciated only after their death. Similarly, Gulabrao Maharaj gained widespread recognition posthumously.

Many of his disciples attained self-realisation and came to be regarded as saints. His principal disciple, Baba Maharaj Pandit (d. 1964), was known both as a scholar and a saint. He authored numerous books, and his commentary on Bhavartha Deepika, written by Sant Dnyaneshwar Maharaj, was published by Geeta Press, Gorakhpur.

== Past life ==
According to certain beliefs, Sant Gulabrao Maharaj was the reincarnation of Swami Becharanand Maharaj (1765–1880) from Zinzuwada, Gujarat, located about 8 miles from Siddhpur. It is said that in his previous life, Becharanand Maharaj performed penance for 12 years in a forest near the Naleshwar temple, sustaining himself solely on lemons. He later spent his remaining years at the Rajasbai Mataji temple in Zinzuwada.

Balavantrao Marathe, originally from Maharashtra, was posted in Zinzuwada as a postmaster from 1864 to 1867. During this time, he and his wife would frequently visit Becharanand Maharaj to seek his blessings. After his retirement, Balavantrao returned to Amravati, Maharashtra. One day, while visiting the Amba Devi temple in Amravati, he rang the temple bells and chanted "Jai Jagdamb". At that moment, he heard someone call out his name: "Who is there, Balavantrao Marathe?"

Surprised, he approached the person and realised it was Gulabrao Maharaj. Maharaj remarked, "Balavantrao, it seems you have forgotten me," and further revealed, "Some people from Zinzuwada have also accompanied me in this life."

Following this incident, Balavantrao began visiting Gulabrao Maharaj regularly. Although devotees often urged him to share the story of how he recognised Maharaj, he initially avoided discussing it. Eventually, however, he agreed to narrate the details about Becharanand Maharaj.
