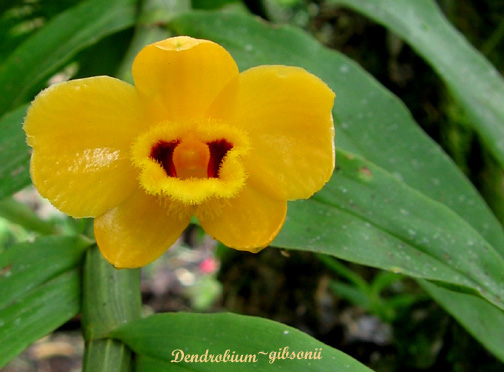

Scientific classification
- Kingdom: Plantae
- Clade: Tracheophytes
- Clade: Angiosperms
- Clade: Monocots
- Order: Asparagales
- Family: Orchidaceae
- Subfamily: Epidendroideae
- Genus: Dendrobium
- Species: D. gibsonii

Binomial name
- Dendrobium gibsonii Paxton

Synonyms
- Callista gibsonii (Paxton) Kuntze; Dendrobium fuscatum Lindl.; Dendrobium binoculare Rchb.f.; Stachyobium aureum Rchb.f.; Callista binocularis (Rchb.f.) Kuntze

= Dendrobium gibsonii =

Species of orchid

Dendrobium gibsonii is a species of orchid native to China (Guangxi and Yunnan provinces), the Himalayas (Nepal, Bhutan, India, Assam), and northern Indochina (Myanmar, Thailand, Laos, Vietnam).
