= List of postage stamps of India (2006–2010) =

This is a list of postage stamps issued by the India Post between 2006 and 2010.

== 2006 ==
#	Issue date	Image	Description	Denomination (paise)	Unit
1	12 January		Pongal	500	Single
2	22 January		A. V. Meiyappan	500	Single
3	29 January		N. M. R. Subbaraman	500	Single
4	1 February		150 Years Third Battalion the Sikh Regiment	500	Single
5	12 February		President's Fleet Review, Visakhapatnam	500 each	Set of 4
6	12 February		President's Fleet Review, Visakhapatnam	500 each	Set of 4
7	12 February		President's Fleet Review, Visakhapatnam	500 each	Set of 4
8	12 February		President's Fleet Review, Visakhapatnam	500 each	Set of 4
9	18 February		Thirumuruga Kirubananda Variyar	500	Single
10	18 February		Devaneya Pavanar	500	Single
11	18 February		Dr. U. V. Swaminatha Iyer	500	Single
12	18 February		Tamilavel Umamaheswarar	500	Single
13	24 February		St. Bede's College, Shimla	500	Single
14	25 February		Gemini Ganesan	500	Single
15	27 February		Don Bosco Salesians in India - 100 Years	500	Single
16	2 March		M. Singaravelar	500	Single
17	15 March		World Consumer Rights Day	500	Single
18	30 March		Indian Agricultural Research Institute : 100 Years	500	Single
19	1 April		62 Cavalry	500	Single
20	12 April		Indo-Cyprus Joint Issue : Cyprus Folk Dance	1500	Set of 2
21	12 April		Indo-Cyprus Joint Issue : Indian Folk Dance	1500	Set of 2
22	21 April		Calcutta Girls' High School	500	Single
23	28 April		Pannalal Barupal	500	Single
25	29 May		Kurinji	1500	Single
25	29 May		Rainwater Harvesting	500	Single
26	15 June		Sri Pratap College, Srinagar	500	Single
27	8 July		Indraprastha Girls' School	500	Single
28	10 July		Voorhees College, Vellore	500	Single
29	10 July		The Vellore Mutiny - 1806	500	Single
30	29 July		High Court of Jammu and Kashmir	500	Single
31	4 August		Pankaj Kumar Mullick	500	Single
32	14 August		Oil And Natural Gas Corporation Limited	500	Single
33	15 August		Ma Po Sivagnanam	500	Single
34	4 September		University of Madras	500	Single
35	5 September		L. V. Prasad	500	Single
36	7 September		Indian Merchants' Chamber	500	Single
37	11 September		Indo-Mongolia Joint Issue - Ancient Art - Horse	1500 each	Se-tenant
38	11 September		Indo-Mongolia Joint Issue - Ancient Art - Horse	1500 each	Se-tenant
39	5 October		Endangered birds of India : greater adjutant stork	500	Set of 4
40	5 October		Endangered birds of India: Nilgiri laughing thrush	500	Set of 4
41	5 October		Endangered birds of India: Manipur bush-quail	500	Set of 4
42	5 October		Endangered birds of India: lesser florican	500	Set of 4
43	12 October		Madhya Pradesh Chamber of Commerce and Industry	500	Single
44	31 October		Bishwanath Roy	500	Single
45	1 November		G. Varadaraj	500	Single
46	6 November		Himalayan Lakes : Roopkund Lake	500	Set of 5
47	6 November		Himalayan Lakes : Sela Lake	500	Set of 5
48	6 November		Himalayan Lakes : Chandra Taal	500	Set of 5
49	6 November		Himalayan Lakes : Tso Moriri	500	Set of 5
50	6 November		Himalayan Lakes : Tsangu Lake	500	Set of 5
51	11 November		Lala Deen Dayal	500	Single
52	14 November		Children's Day	500 each	Set of 2
53	14 November		Children's Day	500 each	Set of 2
54	24 November		The Tribune	500	Single
55	1 December		World AIDS Day	500	Single
56	8 December		150 years of Field Post Offices	500 each	Set of 4
57	8 December		150 years of Field Post Offices	500 each	Set of 4
58	8 December		150 years of Field Post Offices	500 each	Set of 4
59	8 December		150 years of Field Post Offices	500 each	Set of 4
60	10 December		Bartholomaeus Ziegenbalg	500 each	Single
61	13 December		Sandalwood (Fragrant Stamp)	1500	Single
62	26 December		Stop Child Labour	500 each	Set of 4
63	26 December		Stop Child Labour	500 each	Set of 4
64	26 December		Stop Child Labour	500 each	Set of 4
65	26 December		Stop Child Labour	500 each	Set of 4

== 2007 ==
#	Issue date	Image	Description	Denomination (paise)	Unit
1	8 January		Bimal Roy	500	Single
2	26 January		Tamil Nadu Cricket Association	500	Single
3	7 February		Fragrance of Roses : Bhim	500	Set of 4
4	7 February		Fragrance of Roses : Neelam	500	Set of 4
5	7 February		Fragrance of Roses : Delhi Princess	1500	Set of 4
6	7 February		Fragrance of Roses : Jawahar	1500	Set of 4
7	9 February		Manoharbhai Patel	500	Single
8	27 February		Fairs of India : Goa Carnival	500	Set of 4
9	27 February		Fairs of India : Pushkar Fair	500	Set of 4
10	27 February		Fairs of India : Sonepur Fair	500	Set of 4
11	27 February		Fairs of India : Baul Mela	500	Set of 4
12	8 March		Women's Day	500	Set of 4
13	8 March		Women's Day	500	Set of 4
14	8 March		Women's Day	1,500	Set of 4
15	8 March		Women's Day	1,500	Set of 4
16	23 March		Raj Narain	500	Single
17	30 March		Mehboob Khan	500	Single
18	6 April		Dr. RM Alagappa Chettiar	500	Single
19	2 May		2550 years of Mahaparinirvana of Buddha	500	Set of 6
20	2 May		2550 years of Mahaparinirvana of Buddha	500	Set of 6
21	2 May		2550 years of Mahaparinirvana of Buddha	500	Set of 6
22	2 May		2550 years of Mahaparinirvana of Buddha	500	Set of 6
23	2 May		2550 years of Mahaparinirvana of Buddha	500	Set of 6
24	2 May		2550 years of Mahaparinirvana of Buddha	500	Set of 6
25	31 May		National Parks of India : Bandhavgarh National Park	500	Set of 5
26	31 May		National Parks of India : Bandipur National Park	500	Set of 5
27	31 May		National Parks of India : Kaziranga National Park	500	Set of 5
28	31 May		National Parks of India : Mudumalai National Park	500	Set of 5
29	31 May		National Parks of India : Periyar National Park	500	Set of 5
30	9 August		1857 First War of Independence	500	Set of 2
31	9 August		1857 First War of Independence	1,500	Set of 2
32	17 August		Maraimalai Adigal	500	Single
33	17 August		V. G. Suryanarayana Sastriar	500	Single
34	17 August		Saint Vallalar	500	Single
35	17 August		Landmark Bridges of India : Howrah Bridge	500	Set of 4
36	17 August		Landmark Bridges of India : Mahatma Gandhi Setu	500	Set of 4
37	17 August		Landmark Bridges of India : Pamban Bridge	500	Set of 4
38	17 August		Landmark Bridges of India : Vidyasagar Setu	500	Set of 4
39	5 September		J. P. Naik	500	Single
40	23 September		53rd Commonwealth Parliamentary Conference	1500	Single
41	1 October		S. D. Burman	1500	Single
42	2 October		Satyagraha : The Stirring	500 each	Set of 4
43	2 October		Satyagraha : The Stirring	500 each	Set of 4
44	2 October		Satyagraha : The Stirring	500 each	Set of 4
45	2 October		Satyagraha : The Stirring	500 each	Set of 4
46	8 October		Indian Air Force: Platinum Jubilee - Dhruv	500	Set of 4
47	8 October		Indian Air Force: Platinum Jubilee - wapiti	500	Set of 4
48	8 October		Indian Air Force: Platinum Jubilee - AWACS	500	Set of 4
49	8 October		Indian Air Force: Platinum Jubilee - IL-78	1500	Set of 4
50	14 October		4th CISM Military World Games	500 each	Set of 3
51	14 October		4th CISM Military World Games	500 each	Set of 3
52	14 October		4th CISM Military World Games	500 each	Set of 3
53	3 November		Maharashtra Police Academy	500	Single
54	14 November		Children's Day	500 each	Set of 2
55	14 November		Children's Day	500 each	Set of 2
56	22 November		Renewable Energy : Solar Energy	500	Set of 4
57	22 November		Renewable Energy : Wind Energy	500	Set of 4
58	22 November		Renewable Energy : Small Hydro Power	500	Set of 4
59	22 November		Renewable Energy : Biomass Energy	500	Set of 4
60	22 November		First Battalion the Fourth Gorkha Rifles : 150 Years	500	Single
61	3 December		International Day of Disabled Persons	500	Single
62	8 December		The Daly College	500	Single
63	11 December		Wilson College	500	Single
64	15 December		Greetings : Happy New Year	500 each	Set of 5
65	15 December		Greetings : Happy New Year	500 each	Set of 5
66	15 December		Greetings : Happy New Year	500 each	Set of 5
67	15 December		Greetings : Happy New Year	500 each	Set of 5
68	15 December		Greetings : Happy New Year	500 each	Set of 5
69	18 December		S. B. Chavan	500	Single
70	25 December		Our Lady of Snows Basilica	500	Single
71	28 December		Water Year 2007	500	Single
72	31 December		Ritwik Ghatak	500	Single

== 2008 ==
#	Issue date	Image	Description	Denomination (paise)	Unit
1	2 January		Endemic butterflies of Andaman & Nicobar Islands: Papilio mayo (male)	500	Set of 4
2	2 January		Endemic butterflies of Andaman & Nicobar Islands: Papilio mayo (female)	500	Set of 4
3	2 January		Endemic butterflies of Andaman & Nicobar Islands: Pachliopta rhodifer (female)	500	Set of 4
4	2 January		Endemic butterflies of Andaman & Nicobar Islands: Pachliopta rhodifer (male)	500	Set of 4
5	5 January		Dr. B. P. Pal	500	Single
6	8 February		Dr. D. R. Gadgil	500	Single
7	14 February		Damodaram Sanjeevaiah	500	Single
8	4 March		Maharshi Bulusu Samba Murthy	500	Single
9	18 March		Madhubala	500	Single
10	28 March		Asrar-ul- Haq 'Majaaz'	500	Single
11	21 April		Civil Service	500	Single
12	22 April		Tata Steel : 100 Years	500	Single
13	26 April		Jasmine	500	Set of 2
14	26 April		Jasmine	1500	Set of 2
15	17 May		Aga Khan Foundation, Heritage Restoration	500	Set of 2
16	17 May		Aga Khan Foundation, Social Commitment	1,500	Set of 2
17	20 May		Shri Shirdi Sai Baba	500	Single
18	11 June		Rajesh Pilot	500	Single
19	12 June		Henning Holck-Larsen	500	Single
20	30 June		Madhav Institute of Technology and Science, Gwalior	500	Single
21	11 July		Indo-China : Joint Issue: Maha Bodhi Temple	1500	Se-tenant
22	11 July		Indo-China : Joint Issue: White Horse Temple	1500	Se-tenant
23	21 July		14 Punjab (Nabha Akal)	500	Single
24	31 July		Damodar Dharmananda Kosambi	500	Single
25	2 August		Aldabra giant tortoise	500	Set of 2
26	2 August		Aldabra giant tortoise	1,500	Set of 2
27	8 August		Games of the XXIX Olympiad	500	Set of 4
28	8 August		Games of the XXIX Olympiad	500	Set of 4
29	8 August		Games of the XXIX Olympiad	1,500	Set of 4
30	8 August		Games of the XXIX Olympiad	1,500	Set of 4
31	12 August		Indian Coast Guard	500	Set of 4
32	12 August		Indian Coast Guard	500	Set of 4
33	12 August		Indian Coast Guard	500	Set of 4
34	12 August		Indian Coast Guard	500	Set of 4
35	21 August		Ustad Bismillah Khan	500	Single
36	17 September		Sir Pitti Theagarayar	500	Single
37	17 September		Dr. C. Natesan	500	Single
38	17 September		Dr. T. M. Nair	500	Single
39	7 October		Festivals of India: Happy Deepavali	500p	Set of 3
40	7 October		Festivals of India: Dussehra, Kolkata	500p	Set of 3
41	7 October		Festivals of India: Dussehra, Mysore	500p	Set of 3
42	12 October		III Commonwealth Youth Games 2008	500p	Set of 4
43	12 October		III Commonwealth Youth Games 2008	500p	Set of 4
44	12 October		III Commonwealth Youth Games 2008	500p	Set of 4
45	12 October		III Commonwealth Youth Games 2008	500p	Set of 4
46	13 October		Post Office	500p	Single
47	16 October		Food Safety & Quality Year 2008-09	500p	Single
48	18 October		XIX Commonwealth Games	500p	Single
49	14 November		Children's Day	500p	Set of 3
50	14 November		Children's Day	500p	Set of 3
51	14 November		Children's Day	500p	Set of 3
52	16 November		Saint Alphonsa : Canonization	500p	Single
53	16 November		B. N. Reddy	500p	Single
54	17 November		Heritage Building: Standard Chartered Bank	500p	Single
55	19 November		GAIL (India) Limited	500p	Single
56	20 November		Joachim and Violet Alva	500p	Single
57	27 November		Sardar Vallabhbhai Patel National Police Academy, Hyderabad	2000p	Set of 2
58	27 November		Sardar Vallabhbhai Patel National Police Academy, Hyderabad	500p	Set of 2
59	28 November		St. Joseph's Boys' High School, Bangalore	500p	Single
60	30 November		Buddhadeva Bose	500p	Single
61	2 December		Evershed Effect	500p	Single
62	4 December		Indian Navy : Reaching out to Maritime Neighbours	500p	Single
63	8 December		Dr. Laxmi Mall Singhvi	500p	Single
64	8 December		Merry Christmas	2000p	Se-tenant
65	8 December		Merry Christmas	500p	Se-tenant
66	10 December		60 Years : Universal Declaration of Human Rights	500p	Single
67	14 December		Indian Institute of Science	2000p	Se-tenant
68	14 December		Indian Institute of Science	500p	Se-tenant
69	15 December		Swami Ranganathananda Maharaj	500p	Single
70	16 December		Field Marshal SHFJ Manekshaw	500p	Single
71	21 December		T. V. Ramasubbaiyer	500p	Single
72	22 December		BrahMos missile	500p	Set of 2
73	22 December		BrahMos missile	2000p	Set of 2
74	31 December		Rani Velu Nachchiyar	500p	Single
75	31 December		Sheik Thambi Pavalar	500p	Single
76	31 December		Thillaiyadi Valliammai	500p	Single
77	31 December		Udumalai Narayana Kavi	500p	Single
78	31 December		A. T. Paneerselvam	500p	Single
79	31 December		M. Bhakthavatsalam, Former Chief Minister of Tamil Nadu	500p	Single

== 2009 ==
#	Issue date	Image	Description	Denomination (paise)	Unit
1	4 January		Louis Braille Birth Bicentenary	500p	Single
2	21 January		Vaikom Muhammad Basheer	500p	Single
3	25 January		St. Paul's Church, Chennai	500p	Single
4	28 January		Heritage Monuments Preservation by INTACH: Jaisalmer Fort, Jaisalmer	500p	Set of 4
5	28 January		Heritage Monuments Preservation by INTACH: Mongyu Monastery, Laddakh	500p	Set of 4
6	28 January		Heritage Monuments Preservation by INTACH: Qila Mubarak, Patiala	500p	Set of 4
7	28 January		Heritage Monuments Preservation by INTACH: St. Anne Church, Goa	500p	Set of 4
8	31 January		Bishnu Prasad Rabha	500p	Single
9	3 February		SAIL - 50 Years	500p	Single
10	4 February		24 January National Girl Child Day	500p	Single
11	9 February		Maha Kavi Magh	500p	Single
12	9 February		Sant Santaji Jagnade Maharaj	500p	Single
13	11 February		Postal Life Insurance	500p	Single
14	21 February		Jainacharya Vallabh Suri	500p	Single
15	28 February		Harakh Chand Nahata	500p	Single
16	1 March		Medical Council of India	500p	Single
17	6 March		Pterospermum acerifolium	500p	Single
18	12 March		Baburao Puleshwar Shedmake	500p	Single
19	13 March		Dr. Krishna Kumar Birla	500p	Single
20	29 April		Spices of India: black pepper	500p	Set of 5
21	29 April		Spices of India: cinnamon	500p	Set of 5
22	29 April		Spices of India: clove	500p	Set of 5
23	29 April		Spices of India: cardamom	500p	Set of 5
24	29 April		Spices of India: turmeric, coriander and chilly	2000p	Set of 5
25	30 April		R. Sankar	500p	Single
26	12 May		Lifeline Express	500p	Single
27	28 May		The Madras Regiment 1758-2008 : 250 Years of Selfless Sacrifice and Courage	500p	Single
28	12 June		Rev. JJM Nichols Roy	500p	Single
29	19 June		Sacred Heart Church	500p	Single
30	19 June		Rampur Raza Library	500p	Set of 4
31	19 June		Rampur Raza Library	500p	Set of 4
32	19 June		Rampur Raza Library	500p	Set of 4
33	19 June		Rampur Raza Library	500p	Set of 4
34	30 June		50 Years : Indian Oil	500p	Single
35	4 July		Lal Bahadur Shastri National Academy of Administration	500p	Single
36	25 July		Ram Charan Agarwal	500p	Single
37	27 July		Jayadeva and Gita Govinda	500p	Set of 11
38	27 July		Jayadeva and Gita Govinda	500p	Set of 11
39	27 July		Jayadeva and Gita Govinda	500p	Set of 11
40	27 July		Jayadeva and Gita Govinda	500p	Set of 11
41	27 July		Jayadeva and Gita Govinda	500p	Set of 11
42	27 July		Jayadeva and Gita Govinda	500p	Set of 11
43	27 July		Jayadeva and Gita Govinda	500p	Set of 11
44	27 July		Jayadeva and Gita Govinda	500p	Set of 11
45	27 July		Jayadeva and Gita Govinda	500p	Set of 11
46	27 July		Jayadeva and Gita Govinda	500p	Set of 11
47	27 July		Jayadeva and Gita Govinda	500p	Set of 11
48	1 August		St. Joseph's College, Bangalore	500p	Single
49	4 August		Maharishi Patanjali	500p	Single
50	12 August		Pingali Venkaiah	500p	Single
51	16 August		Heritage Railway Stations of India: Howrah Station	500p	Set of 4
52	16 August		Heritage Railway Stations of India: Chennai Central Station	500p	Set of 4
53	16 August		Heritage Railway Stations of India: Mumbai CST Station	500p	Set of 4
54	16 August		Heritage Railway Stations of India: Old Delhi Station	500p	Set of 4
55	3 September		Uttam Kumar	500p	Single
56	9 September		Sacred Heart Matriculation Higher Secondary School, Chennai	500p	Single
57	14 September		Holy Cross Church	500p	Single
58	27 September		Dushyant Kumar	500p	Single
59	1 October		Rare fauna of the North-East: red panda	500p	Set of 3
60	1 October		Rare fauna of the North-East: marbled cat	500p	Set of 3
61	1 October		Rare fauna of the North-East: Barbe's leaf monkey	500p	Set of 3
62	6 October		Bishop Cotton School, Shimla	500p	Single
63	10 October		R. K. Narayan	500p	Single
64	11 October		Dineshnandini Dalmia	500p	Single
65	12 October		India Post Freighter	500p	Single
66	14 October		Heritage Temples: Dilwara Temple	500p	Set of 2
67	14 October		Heritage Temples: Ranakpur Temple	500p	Set of 2
68	21 October		Maharaja Gulab Singh	500p	Single
69	22 October		Major General Dewan Misri Chand	500p	Single
70	29 October		Jeanne Jugan	2000p	Se-tenant
71	29 October		Little Sisters of Poor	500p	Se-tenant
72	1 November		Dr. Rajkumar	500p	Single
73	2 November		Apollo Hospitals	500p	Single
74	2 November		Dr. Mahendra Lal Sircar	500p	Single
75	7 November		Danmal Mathur	500p	Single
76	8 November		Virchand Raghavji Gandhi	500p	Single
77	9 November		Indigenous horses of India: Kathiawari	500p	Set of 4
78	9 November		Indigenous horses of India: Marwari	500p	Set of 4
79	9 November		Indigenous horses of India: Zanskari	500p	Set of 4
80	9 November		Indigenous horses of India: Manipuri	500p	Set of 4
81	11 November		Rajabhau Khobragade	500p	Single
82	12 November		Gaurishanker Dalmia	500p	Single
83	13 November		60 Years of The Commonwealth	500p	Single
84	14 November		Children's Day	500p each	Set of 2
85	14 November		Children's Day	500p	Set of 2
86	15 November		Silent Valley	500p	Single
87	16 November		India-Philippines: Joint issue: Gangetic dolphin (Platanista gangetica)	500p	Se-tenant
88	16 November		India-Philippines: Joint issue: Butanding (Rhincodon Typus)	2000p	Se-tenant
89	18 November		Ganpatrao Govindrao Jadhav	500p	Single
90	30 November		Tamil Nadu Police	500p	Single
91	1 December		Greetings	500p	Set of 4
92	1 December		Greetings	500p	Set of 4
93	1 December		Greetings	500p	Set of 4
94	1 December		Greetings	500p	Set of 4
95	2 December		Convent of Jesus and Mary, Ambala Cantt. : 100 Years	500p	Single
96	2 December		2nd Lancers (Gardner's Horse)	500p	Single
97	10 December		Traditional Indian Textiles: Kalamkari	500p	Set of 4
98	10 December		Traditional Indian Textiles: Apatani Weaves	500p	Set of 4
99	10 December		Traditional Indian Textiles: Kanchipuram Silk	500p	Set of 4
100	10 December		Traditional Indian Textiles: Banaras Silk	500p	Set of 4
101	15 December		Henry Louis Vivian Derozio	500p	Single
102	17 December		Lal Pratap Singh	500p	Single
103	19 December		Preserve the Polar Regions and Glaciers	500p	Set of 2
104	19 December		Preserve the Polar Regions and Glaciers	500p	Set of 2
105	27 December		Indian Mathematical Society	500p	Single
106	27 December		Venkataramana Bhagavathar	500p	Single
107	29 December		Maharaja Surajmal	500p	Single

== 2010 ==
#	Issue date	Image	Description	Denomination (paise)	Unit
1	5 January		20th Conference of Speakers and Presiding Officers of the Commonwealth	500p	Single
2	16 January		Reserve Bank of India	500p	Single
3	25 January		Election Commission of India	500p	Single
4	21 February		The Bible Society of India	500p	Single
5	23 February		P. C. Sorcar	500p	Single
6	19 March		16 Punjab (2nd Patiala)	500p	Single
7	30 March		Muthuramalinga Sethupathi	500p	Single
8	30 March		Special Protection Group	500p	Single
9	31 March		Vallal Pachaiyappa	500p	Single
10	14 April		Astrological signs: Aries	500p	Set of 12
11	14 April		Astrological signs: Taurus	500p	Set of 12
12	14 April		Astrological signs: Gemini	500p	Set of 12
13	14 April		Astrological signs: Cancer	500p	Set of 12
14	14 April		Astrological signs: Leo	500p	Set of 12
15	14 April		Astrological signs: Virgo	500p	Set of 12
16	14 April		Astrological signs: Libra	500p	Set of 12
17	14 April		Astrological signs: Scorpio	500p	Set of 12
18	14 April		Astrological signs: Sagittarius	500p	Set of 12
19	14 April		Astrological signs: Capricorn	500p	Set of 12
20	14 April		Astrological signs: Aquarius	500p	Set of 12
21	14 April		Astrological signs: Pisces	500p	Set of 12
22	17 April		Chandra Shekhar	500p	Single
23	26 April		Kanwar Ram Sahib	500p	Single
24	6 May		Velu Thampi	500p	Single
25	7 May		Robert Caldwell	500p	Single
26	8 May		Dr. Guduru Venkatachalam	500p	Single
27	13 May		Postal Heritage Buildings - INDIPEX 2011: Delhi GPO	500 p	Set of 6
28	13 May		Postal Heritage Buildings - INDIPEX 2011: Shimla GPO	500 p	Set of 6
29	13 May		Postal Heritage Buildings -INDIPEX 2011: Udagamandalam HPO	500 p	Set of 6
30	13 May		Postal Heritage Buildings - INDIPEX 2011: Cooch Behar HPO	500 p	Set of 6
31	13 May		Postal Heritage Buildings - INDIPEX 2011: Nagpur GPO	500 p	Set of 6
32	13 May		Postal Heritage Buildings -INDIPEX 2011: Lucknow GPO	500 p	Set of 6
33	19 May		C. V. Raman Pillai	500p	Single
34	5 June		International Year of Biodiversity, Goose Fish Crayfish	2000p	Set of 2
35	5 June		International Year of Biodiversity, Rice Planter Owl	500p	Set of 2
36	14 June		Desh Bandhu Gupta	500p	Single
37	25 June		XIX Commonwealth Games – Queen's Baton Relay	2000p	Set of 2
38	25 June		XIX Commonwealth Games – Queen's Baton Relay	500p	Set of 2
39	27 June		World Classical Tamil Conference 2010 – Kovai	500p	Single
40	27 June		Kumaraguruparar Swamigal	500p	Single
41	7 July		Indian Naval Air Squadron-300	500p	Single
42	9 July		Birds: pigeon	500p	Set of 2
43	9 July		Birds: sparrow	500p	Set of 2
44	12 July		Rath Yatra, Puri	500p	Single
45	1 August		XIX Commonwealth Games: Jawaharlal Nehru Stadium	500p	Set of 2
46	1 August		XIX Commonwealth Games: Talkatora Stadium	500p	Set of 2
47	2 August		Syed Mohammed Ali Shihab Thangal	500p	Single
48	14 August		Vethathiri	500p	Single
49	21 August		P. Jeevanandam	500p	Single
50	25 August		Omanthur P. Ramaswamy Reddiar	500p	Single
51	30 August		G. K. Moopanar	500p	Single
52	2 September		Dr. Y. S. Rajasekhara Reddy	500p	Single
53	26 September		Brihadeeswarar Temple	500p	Single
54	3 October		XIX Commonwealth Games	5 ₹ each	Set of 4
55	3 October		XIX Commonwealth Games	5 ₹ each	Set of 4
56	3 October		XIX Commonwealth Games	5 ₹ each	Set of 4
57	3 October		XIX Commonwealth Games	5 ₹ each	Set of 4
58	6 October		Princely States-INDIPEX 2011: Princely State – Cochin	500p each	Set of 4
59	6 October		Princely States-INDIPEX 2011: Princely State – Bamra	500p each	Set of 4
60	6 October		Princely States-INDIPEX 2011: Princely State – Sirmoor	500p each	Set of 4
61	6 October		Princely States-INDIPEX 2011: Princely State – Indore	500p each	Set of 4
62	9 October		Immanuel Sekaranar	500p	Single
63	22 October		The Doon School, Dehradun	500p	Single
64	25 October		Sant Shadaram Sahib	500p	Single
65	27 October		Cathedral & John Connon School, Mumbai	500p	Single
66	29 October		Kranti Trivedi	500p	Single
67	10 November		K. A. P. Viswanatham	500p	Single
68	14 November		Children's Day	500p each	Set of 4
69	14 November		Children's Day	500p each	Set of 4
70	14 November		Children's Day	500p each	Set of 4
71	14 November		Children's Day	500p each	Set of 4
72	15 November		Lakshmipat Singhania	500p	Single
73	16 November		Comptroller and Auditor General of India	500p	Single
74	28 November		C. Subramaniam	500p	Single
75	1 December		Kamlapat Singhania	500p	Single
76	3 December		T. N. Rajarathinam Pillai	500p	Single
77	3 December		Veenai Dhanammal	500p	Single
78	3 December		Thanjavur Balasaraswati	500p	Single
79	6 December		Sri Sri Borda	500p	Single
80	11 December		Prafulla Chandra Chaki	500p	Single
81	15 December		India – Mexico Joint issue: Jarabe Tapatio	2000p	Set of 2
82	15 December		India – Mexico Joint issue: Kalbelia Dance	500p	Set of 2
83	21 December		Crafts Museum	500p	Set of 2
84	21 December		Crafts Museum	500p	Set of 2
85	22 December		Yashwantrao Balwantrao Chavan	500p	Single
86	22 December		Bhausaheb Hiray	500p	Single
87	23 December		Bhai Jiwan Singh	500p	Single
88	23 December		Central Bank of India	500p	Single
89	24 December		Dr. Triguna Sen	500p	Set of 2
90	24 December		National Council of Education	500p	Set of 2
91	31 December		Lalit Kala Akademi	500p	Single

== See also ==
- List of postage stamps of India
- List of Miniature Sheets from India Post
- Postage stamps and postal history of India
