= Amritpex 2023 =

2023 national philatelic exhibition

- Date: 11 February 2023
- Duration: 5 days
- Venue: Pragati Maidan Exhibition Complex
- Location: New Delhi, India; 28.616813°N 77.243359°E
- Type: National Philatelic Exhibition
- Theme: Azadi Ka Amrit Mahotsav
- Website: amritpex2023.in

Amritpex 2023 was the national philatelic exhibition organized by India Post, Government of India in collaboration with the Ministry of Culture and Philatelic Congress of India (PCI). It was held at Halls No. 5 of the Pragati Maidan Exhibition Complex, New Delhi, India from 11 to 15 February 2023.

== Elements of the show ==
The five day event was inaugurated by Ashwini Vaishnaw, Minister of Railways, Communication and Electronics and Information Technology, in attendance with Devusinh Chauhan, Minister of State for Communications of India and Vineet Pandy, Secretary of the Department of Post.

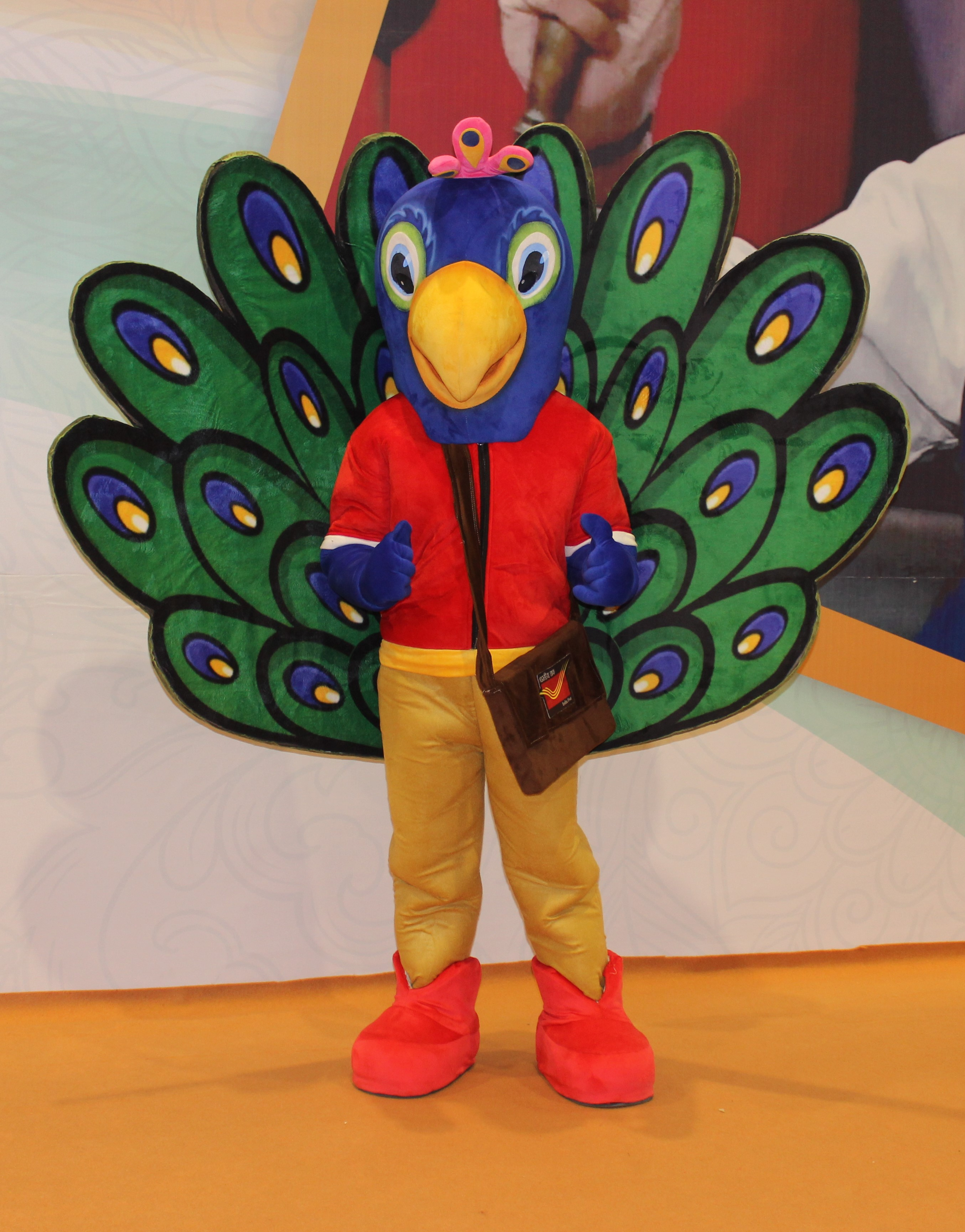
Philly, The official mascot of Amritpex 2023

To promote the event Department of Post unveiled a mascot, a mobile app, a short film, and a mini-exhibition with a stamp theme. Exhibition mascot Philly was designed and inspired from Peacock, representing the national bird of India and symbolizes the Philatelic Division of Department of Posts, Government of India. Dedicated Mobile app for the Amritpex-2023 was launched to the ease of visitors for the updates of events, history and services of India Post.

Workshops, seminars, competitions and cultural activities

Various activities like workshops, seminars and competitions including storytelling, envelope art with philately stamps, paper crafts, wall of Stamps, Live Painting by Artists and Painters, Curated and Guided Tours, Time Capsule, kiosks to generate digital postcards, letter writing, calligraphy were organized to draw attention to school children.

Along with philatelic workshops cultural activities are organised. Dak Ghar Play by National School of Drama, Dance performance by Bal Bhawan, Kavi Sammelan by Jashn-e-Adab, Sitar performance by Utsad Shujaat Khan, Concert by Piyush Mishra, puppet show and youth parliament were major attraction of cultural events.

New stamps and special covers

During the exhibition, India Post released Se-tenant stamps on Azadi Ka Amrit Mahotsav on 11 February 2023. Set of 2 miniature sheets on 'Bridal Costumes of India', with 4 stamps of Rs. 25.00 each were released on 12 February 2023. A miniature sheet containing 12 stamps of denomination Rs. 5.00 each was released on GI tag of agricultural products on 13 February. A series of special covers on Nari Shakti, Yuva Shakti, International Year of Millets 2023, Nature & Wildlife of India and unsung heroes of freedom struggle of India, along with set of picture postcards on 'Flavours of Delhi' were released during the event.

== Exhibits ==
The National Philatelic Exhibition (referred to as Amritpex 2023) was organized under the aegis of Azadi Ka Amrit Mahotsav Celebrations. Around 1,400 competitive exhibit frames displayed stamp presentations in numerous categories created by around 300 collectors from all over India.

The main themes of the exhibitions were: 75th Anniversary of Indian Independence and New India, Youth Power (Yuva Shakti), Women Power (Nari Shakti) Achivements@75 Nature and Wildlife and Culture and History.

Exhibition classes and competitions

The philatelic exhibition at Amritpex 2023 holds competitions in the following classes:

1. Invitee Class (Non Competitive Class)
2. Competitive Class

Class 1 - National Championship Class
Class 2 - Traditional Philately
Class 3 - Postal History
Class 4 - Postal Stationery
Class 5 - Aerophilately / Astrophilately
Class 6 - Thematic
Class 7 - Maximaphily
Class 8 - Revenue
Class 9 - First Day Covers and Special Covers
Class 10 - Modern Philately
Class 11 - Open Class
Class 12 - One Frame Exhibits
Class 13 - Philatelic Literature
Class 14 - Youth Class
Class 15 - School Collections

To celebrate the 75th Anniversary of Indian Independence, a special section dedicated to the achievements of India at 75 (years) in collaboration with Ministry of Culture was added to the competition as AKAM (Azadi Ka Amrit Mahotsav) Class. Freedom Struggle, Ideas @75, Resolve @75, Actions @75, and Achievements @75 were the themes for the AKAM Class.

== Gallery ==
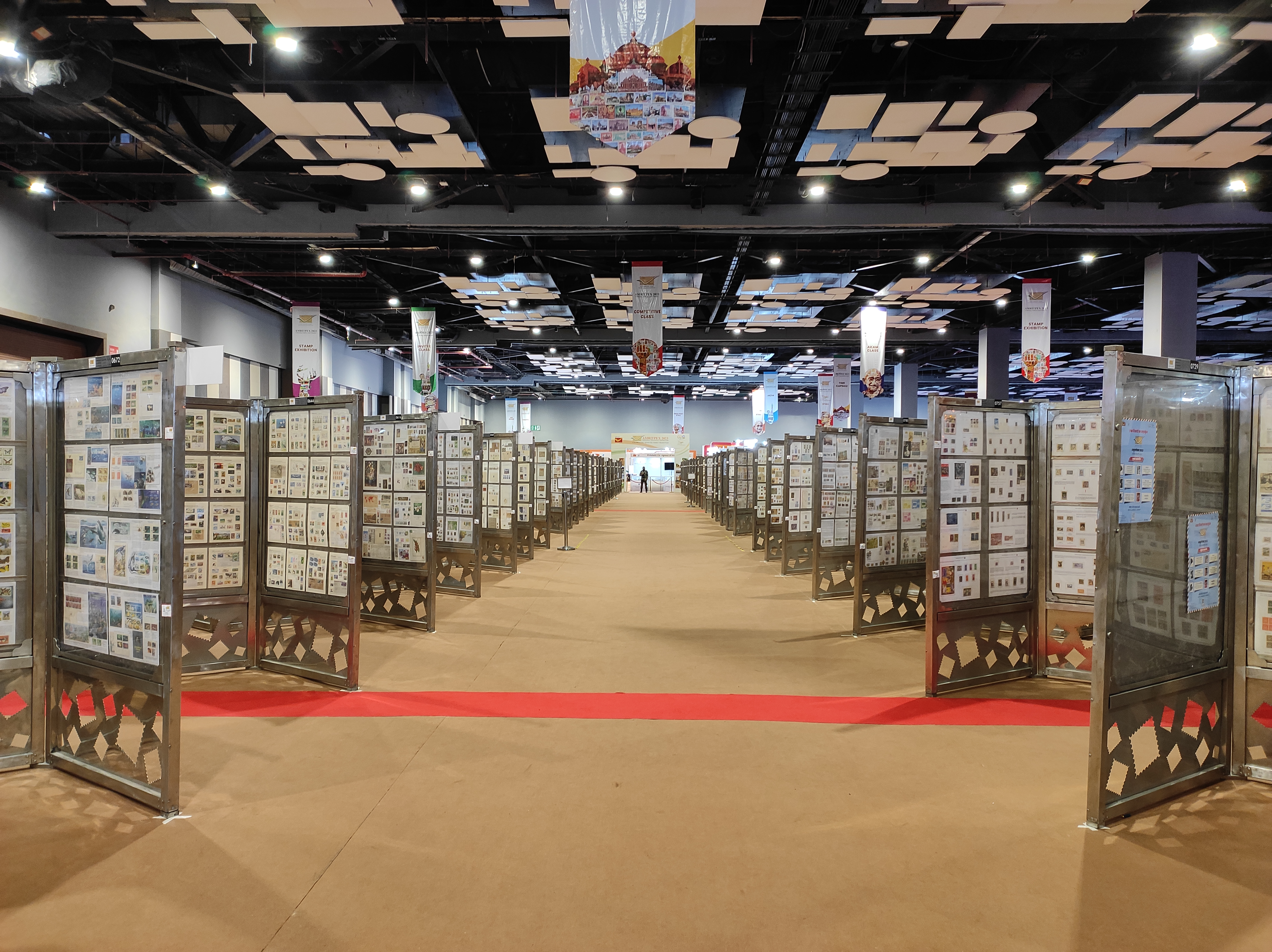
A view of exhibit area

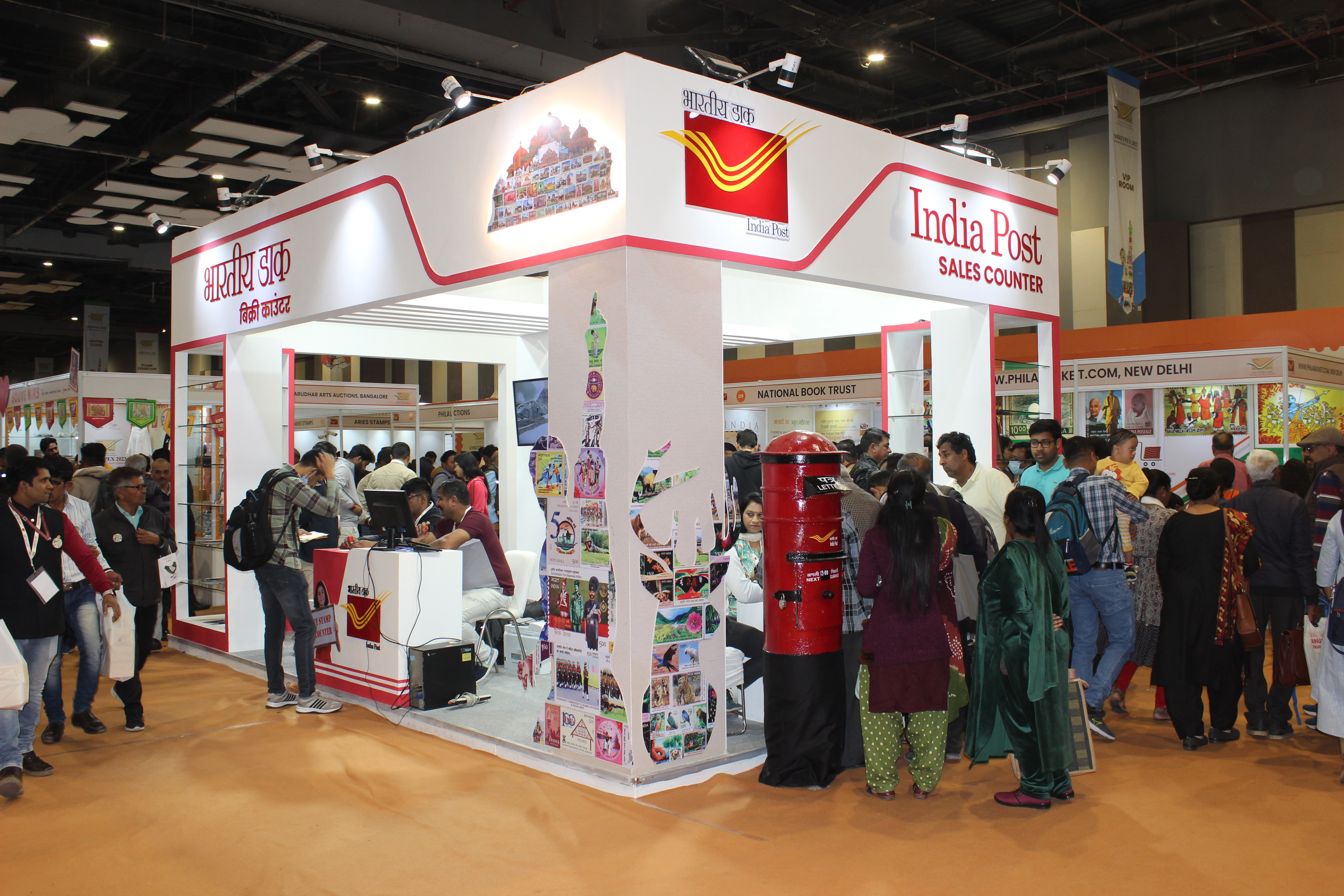
India Post Sales Counter

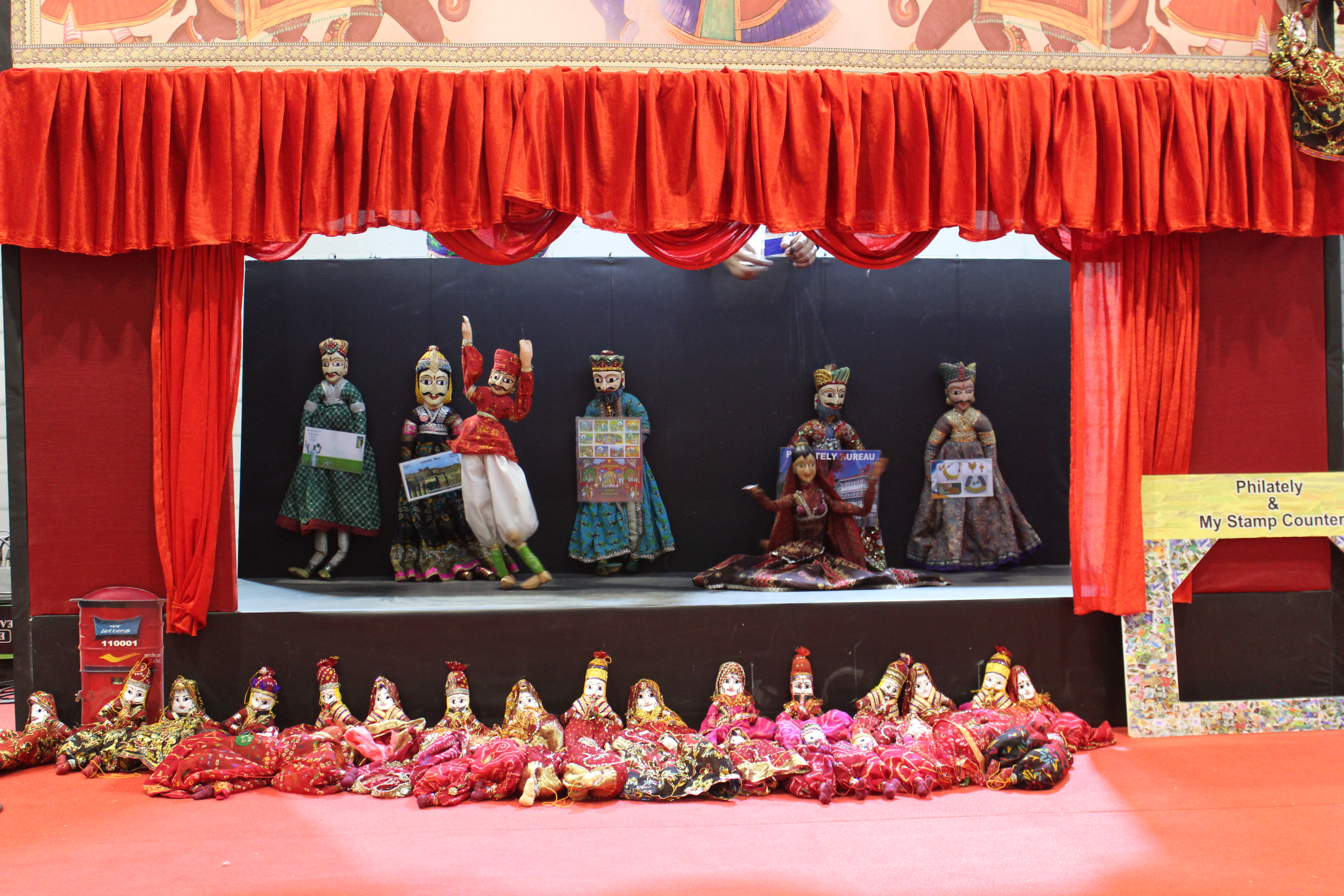
Puppet show

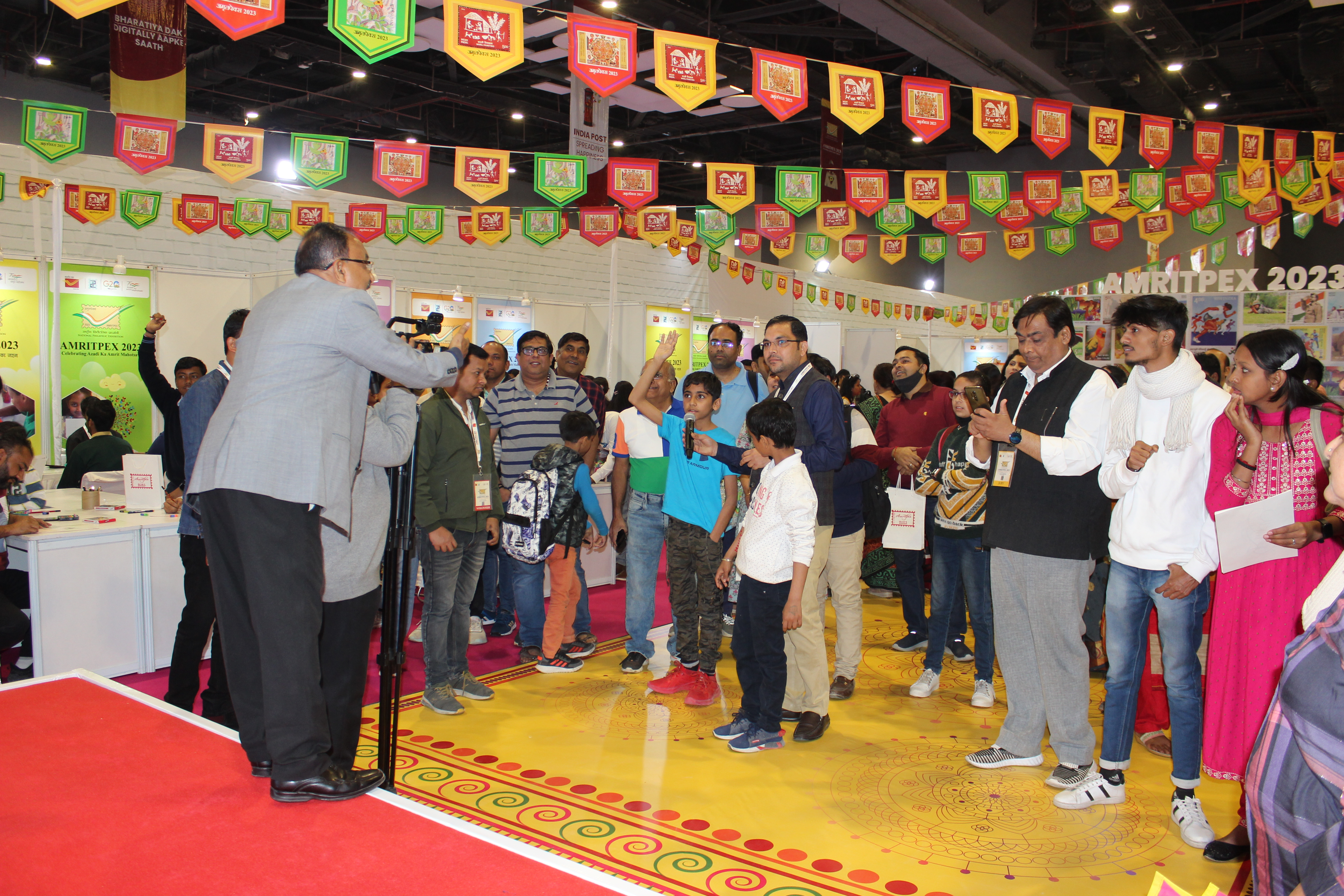
Quiz Competition

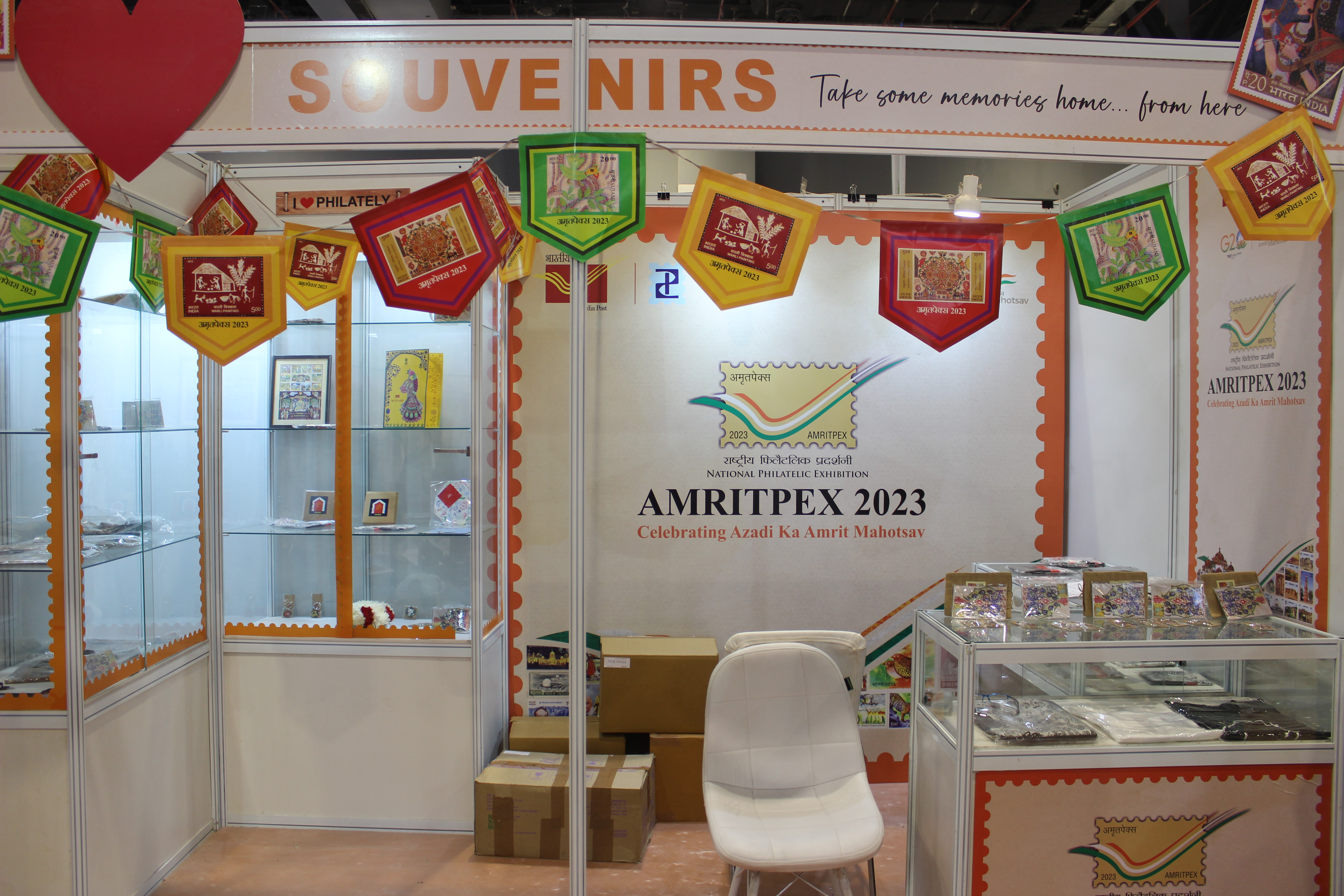
Souvenir Shop

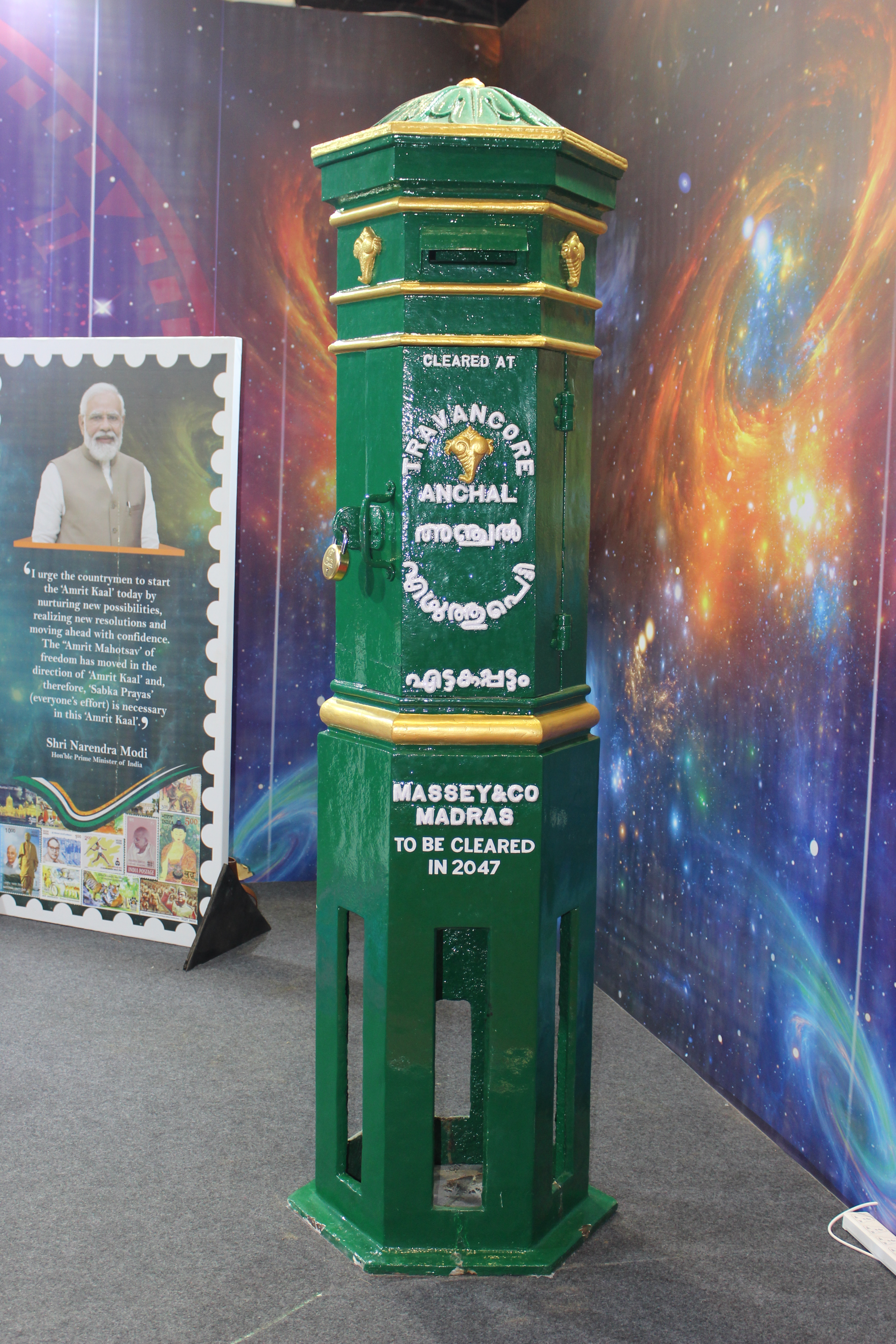
Time Capsule

== See also ==
- Indipex 2011
