= Bali Butterfly Park =

- Interactive map of Bali Butterfly Park
- 8°28′49″S 115°07′54″E
- Location: Tabanan Regency, Bali, Indonesia

Bali Butterfly Park is a butterfly park in Tabanan Regency, Bali, Indonesia. The park is home to some of the rare species of butterflies including the birdwing butterfly, swallowtail and great Mormon.

Bali Butterfly Park is dedicated to research, breeding and preservation of butterflies.
