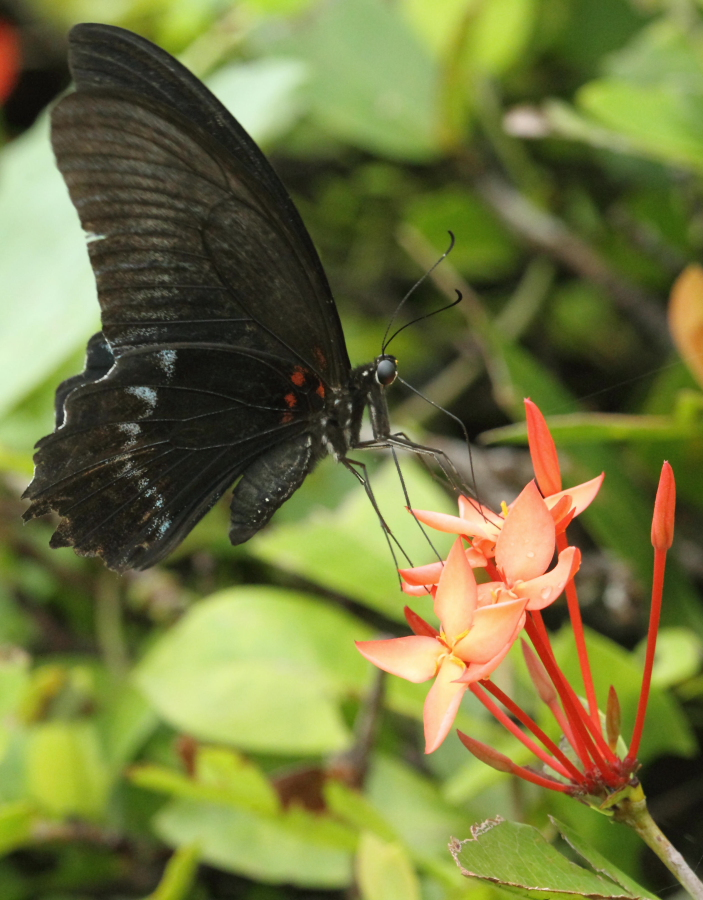

Scientific classification
- Kingdom: Animalia
- Phylum: Arthropoda
- Class: Insecta
- Order: Lepidoptera
- Family: Papilionidae
- Genus: Papilio
- Species: P. memnon
- Subspecies: P. m. mayo

Trinomial name
- Papilio memnon mayo Atkinson, 1873

Synonyms
- Princeps mayo

= Papilio memnon mayo =

Andaman Mormon

Species of butterfly

Papilio memnon mayo, the Andaman Mormon, is a subspecies of swallowtail butterfly that is endemic to the Andamans in the Bay of Bengal. It is a species that is protected by Indian Law. The scientific name honours Richard Bourke, 6th Earl of Mayo, who was assassinated at Port Blair the year before the butterfly was discovered.

== Description ==
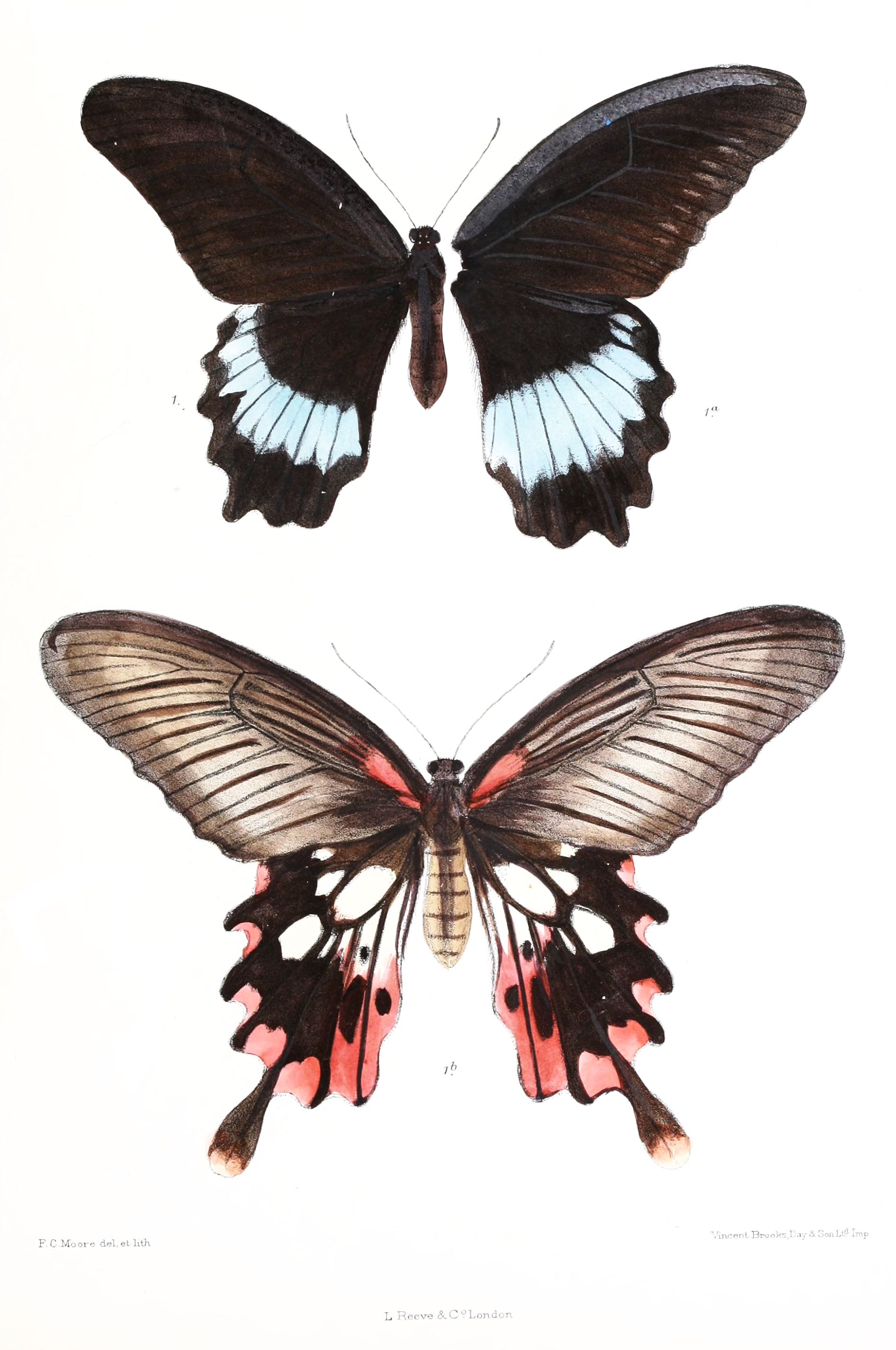
Male above, female below

The male Andaman Mormon resembles the blue Mormon (Papilio agenor polymnestor) while the female resembles the female form alcanor of the great Mormon (Papilio memnon) and is a mimic of the Andaman clubtail (Losaria rhodifer).

The male has the upperside of its wings a rich velvety black. The forewing has a subterminal series of greenish-yellow irrorated (speckled) internervular streaks, sometimes very faint. The hindwing has a very broad discal band pale blue, composed of broad outwardly more or less emarginate streaks in interspaces 1 to 7; cilia: forewing black, hindwing black alternated with white in the interspaces. Underside opaque blue black. Forewing with a dark red streak at base and the subterminal internervular streaks as on the upperside but grey and more prominent. Hindwing with four or five small patches of dark red at base, a complete dark red eyespot in interspaces 1 and 2, and indistinct subterminal very variable markings of red in the other interspaces, sometimes formed into half eyespots in interspaces 3 and 4; within this line of markings there is an incomplete discal lunular series of mixed red and blue scaling. Antennae, head, thorax and abdomen black.

The female closely resembles the tailed form of the female of Papilio memnon race agenor, but on the disc of the forewing the internervular broad pale streaks are nearly white, and on the hindwing the white streaks in the interspaces beyond and outside the cell shorter and strongly tinged with red along their edges, while the dark red is more extended, especially in the tornal area where it covers the terminal three-fourths of interspaces 1 and 2, interrupted in 1 by a comparatively round oval black spot and in 2 by a broad elongate black patch; apical half of tail vermilion red, whitish at apex.

== Range ==
Andaman Islands of India in the Bay of Bengal.

== Status ==
It is not common. It is protected by law in India. Males are reported to be more common than females.

== See also ==
- Papilionidae
- List of butterflies of India (Papilionidae)

== Other reading ==
- Evans, W.H. (1932). The Identification of Indian Butterflies (2nd ed.). Mumbai, India: Bombay Natural History Society.
- Gay, Thomas; Kehimkar, Isaac David; Punetha, Jagdish Chandra (1992). Common Butterflies of India. Nature Guides. Bombay, India: World Wide Fund for Nature-India by Oxford University Press. ISBN 978-0195631647.
- Wynter-Blyth, Mark Alexander (1957). Butterflies of the Indian Region. Bombay, India: Bombay Natural History Society. ISBN 978-8170192329.
