= Dinesh Nandini Dalmia =

Indian writer (1928–2007)

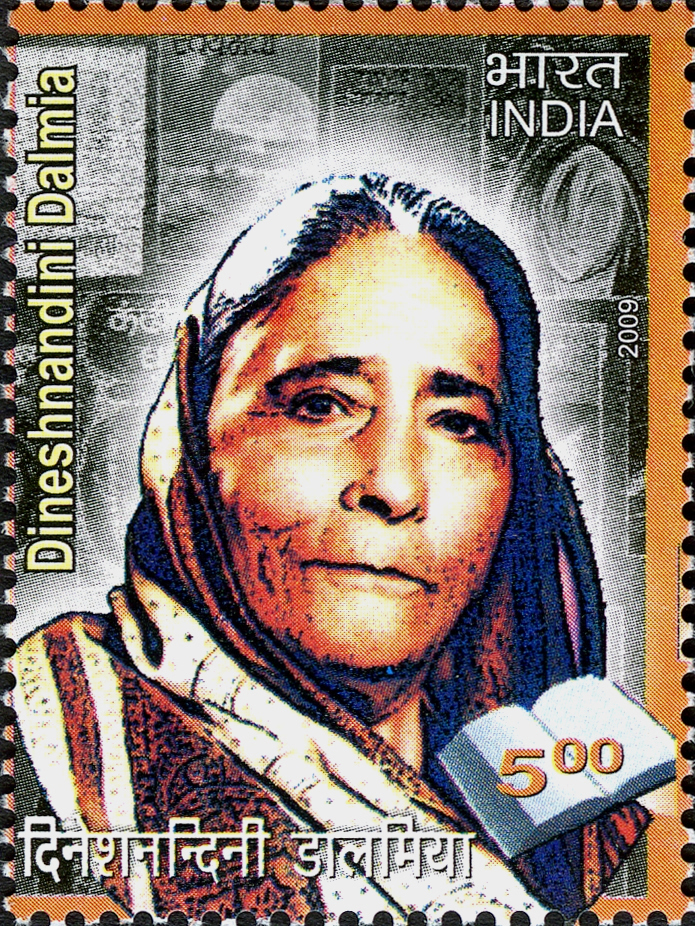
- Born: 16 February 1928; Udaipur, Udaipur State, British India
- Died: 25 October 2007 (aged 79); Delhi, India
- Other name: Dineshnandini Dalmia
- Occupations: Poet; Short story writer Novelist
- Known for: Hindi literature
- Spouse: Ramkrishna Dalmia
- Awards: Padma Bhushan; Sakseria Award; Mahila Sasakthikaran Puraskar; Prem Chand Award

Dinesh Nandini Dalmia (16 February 1928 – 25 October 2007), also written as Dineshnandini Dalmia, was an Indian poet, short story writer and novelist of Hindi literature. She was the fifth wife of Ramkrishna Dalmia, founder of the Dalmia Group, and three of his four previous wives were still alive and married to him when she became his fifth wife. Nevertheless, she positioned herself in opposition to gender discrimination and purdah system, and published poems, prose poems, short stories and novels on the theme of women's emancipation. Shabnam , Niraash Aasha, Mujhe Maaf Kama and Yeh Bhi Jhooth Hai are some of her notable works. The Government of India awarded her the third highest civilian honour of the Padma Bhushan, in 2006, for her contributions to literature. In 2009, India Posts released a commemorative stamp on her.

== Biography ==
Dinesh Nandini Dalmia, née Dinesh Nandini Chordia, was born on 16 February 1928 in Udaipur in the Indian state of Rajasthan. She started her literary activities at the age of 13, and though she married Ramkrishna Dalmia, the founder of the Dalmia Group in 1946 at the age of 18, continued her studies to secure a post graduate degree, thus becoming the first woman master's degree holder in the state of Rajasthan. Her initial works were prose poems, but later wrote poems, starting with Niraash Aasha and her first published book was Shabnam which earned her the Sakseria Award. Subsequently, she also wrote short stories and novels and published 35 of them, besides a number of poetry anthologies. Phool ka Dard, documentary film, is made on her work of the same name.

Dalmia was known to have been a feminist in her views and protested against Purdah system and discrimination against women. She was a member of Indo-China Friendship Society, Lekhika Sangh and the Institute of Comparative Religion and Literature (ICRL) and served as the president of ICRL. She was one of the founders of the literary magazine, Richa and was its chief editor. She received Mahila Sasakthikaran Puraskar of the Hindi Sahitya Akademi in 2001 and Rani Durgavati University conferred a doctorate (honoris causa) on her in 2005. The next year, the Government of India awarded her the civilian honor of the Padma Bhushan. She was also a recipient of Prem Chand Award.

Dinesh Nandini Dalmia died on 25 October 2007, at the age of 79 in Delhi. Neelima Dalmia Adhar, noted writer, is her daughter. Delhi administration named a market at W-point, Tilak Marg as Dineshnandini Dalmia Chowk in her honor. An interview with her was published by Kamal Kishore Goenka in 2002 under the title, Dinesh Nandini Dalmiya Se Baatchit. India Posts issued a commemorative stamp on her in 2009.

== See also ==
- Ramkrishna Dalmia
- List of postage stamps of India (2005–09)
