= Indipex 2011 =

- Company type: World Philatelic Exhibition
- Website: www.indipex2011.com

Indipex 2011 was organized by India Post, Government of India in collaboration with the Philatelic Congress of India (PCI) under the patronage of the Federation Internationale de Philatelie (FIP) and the auspices of the Federation of Inter-Asian Philately (FIAP).

The World Philatelic Exhibition (referred to as INDIPEX 2011) was held at Halls No. 8, 9, 10 and 11 of the Pragati Maidan Exhibition Complex, New Delhi, India from 12 to 18 February 2011.

The first International stamp exhibition in India was held in 1954 to commemorate 100 years of postage stamp in India. Second International Stamp Exhibition Indipex-73 was held in New Delhi in 1973. Next was an Asian International Stamp Exhibition Asiana-77 held in Bangalore in 1977.

In 1980 World Stamp Exhibition INDIA-80 was held in New Delhi. It was the first exhibition held in India organized by India Post, Government of India in collaboration with the Philatelic Congress of India (PCI) under the patronage of the Federation Internationale de Philatelie (FIP).

In 1989 next International exhibition named INDIA-89 was organised in New Delhi. To commemorate 50 years of India's Independence in 1997 International Exhibition was named Indepex-97 and was held in New Delhi. Both of the exhibitions were organized by India Post, Government of India in collaboration with the Philatelic Congress of India (PCI) under the patronage of the Federation Internationale de Philatelie (FIP).

In the year 2000 Asian International Stamp Exhibition was held in Calcutta. Now this Indipex 2011 is IX Indian international Stamp Exhibition.

== Palmares ==
The Grand Prix awards went to the following exhibits:

The International Grand Prix went to Paulo Rodolpho Comelli for 'Brazilian Mail to Foreign Destinations'.

The Grand Prix D’Honneur went to Martha Villarroel de Peredo for 'Bolivia 19th Century - Study Of The Condors'.

== See also ==
- Amritpex 2023
