= Ram Charan Agarwal =

Indian politician

Ram Charan Agarwal (1917 - 1977) was an Indian politician and freedom fighter who served as Deputy Mayor of Delhi. He is the father of Jai Parkash Aggarwal.

== Honors ==
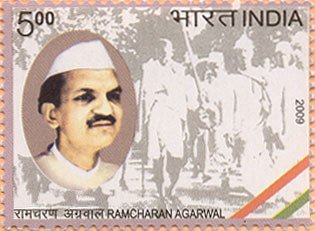
- Ramcharan Agarwal in 2009 Stamp of India.
  In 2009, India Post honored him by issuing stamp on him.
- In 2021, he got tribute years after his death by Mahabal Mishra, Shaktisinh Gohil and Jai Parkash Aggarwal.
