= International Year of Millets =

2023 celebration of food grain

Logo of the International Year of Millets, used by the Food and Agriculture Organization

Food and Agriculture Organization and United Nations has recognised 2023 as International Year of Millets or IYM2023 for awareness about health and nutritional benefits of millets. The Indian Government proposed to celebrate 2023 as International Year of Millets.

Because millets use less water to produce and grow in less time, they can be alternatives to imported cereals. Millets also have high nutritional values.

== Around the world ==
- India contributes 80% of millet production in Asia and 20% worldwide. In 2023-24 Union Budget, India declared funds for Millet Research Institute. India will provide millets by Public Distribution System to people of below the poverty line.
- Indian Diplomats visited Nigeria as Millets Specific Visit. India and Nigeria both uses Millet as staple food.
