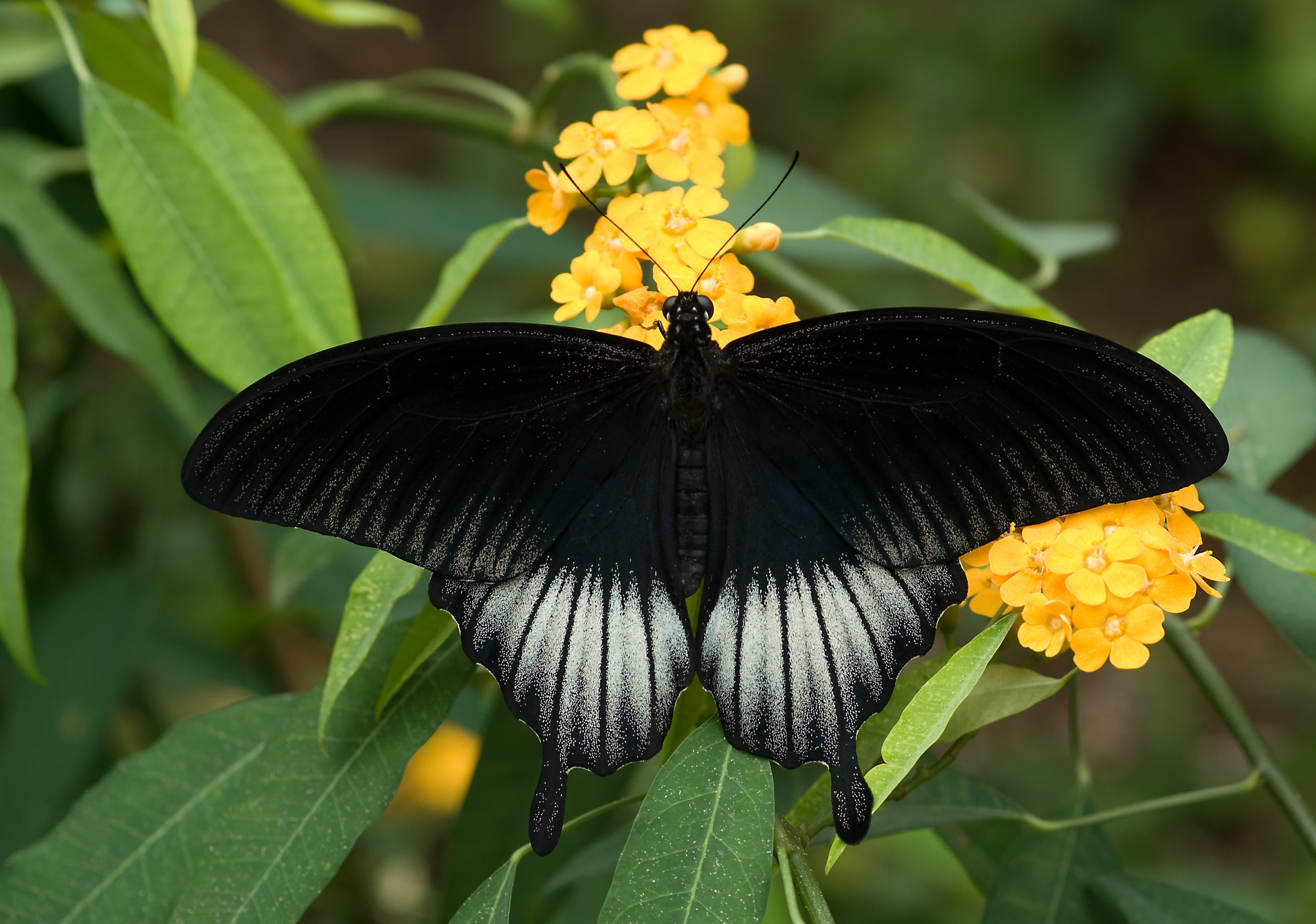
- Male
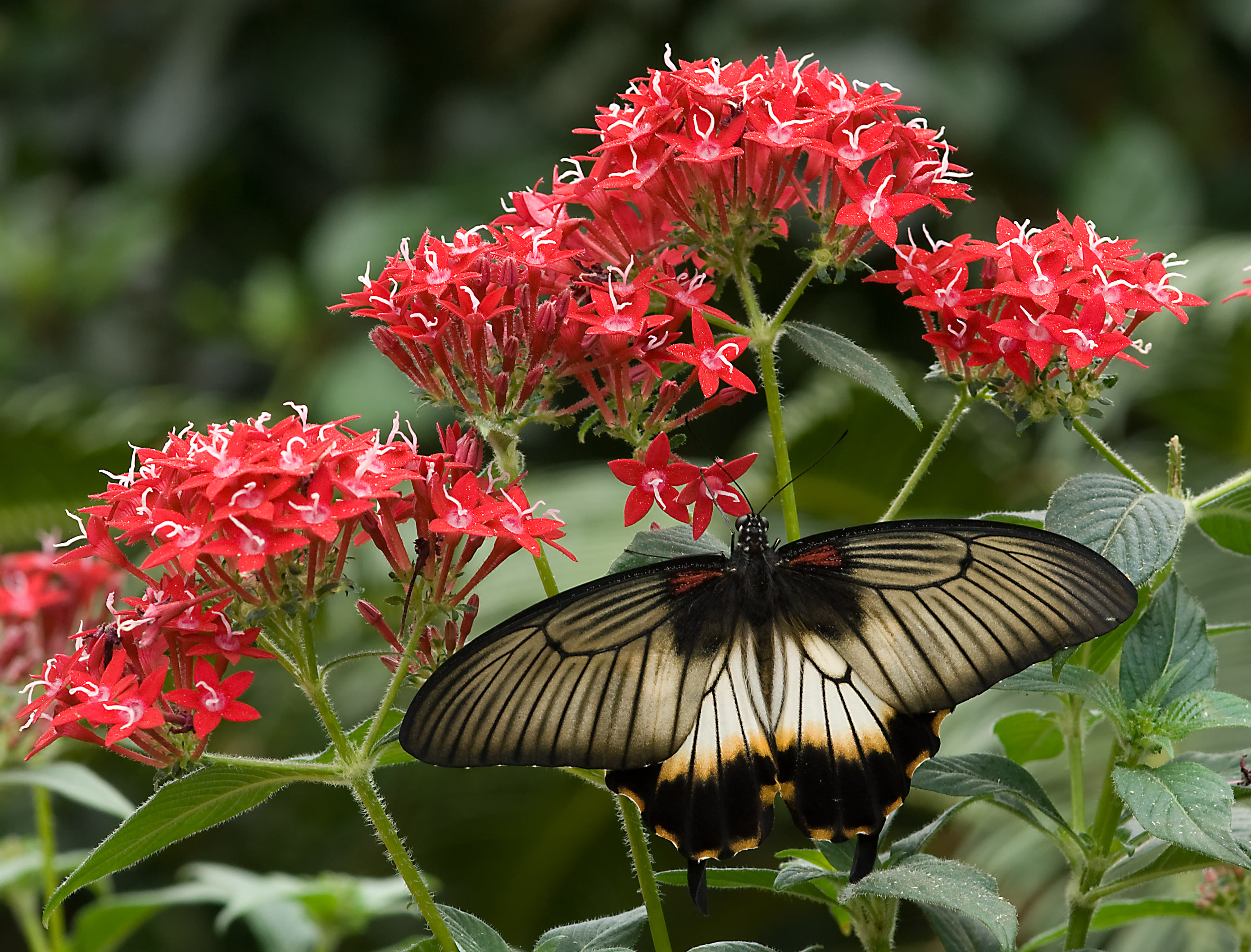
- Female

Scientific classification
- Kingdom: Animalia
- Phylum: Arthropoda
- Clade: Pancrustacea
- Class: Insecta
- Order: Lepidoptera
- Family: Papilionidae
- Genus: Papilio
- Species: P. memnon

Binomial name
- Papilio memnon Linnaeus, 1758

Subspecies
- P. m. memnon; P. m. mayo Atkinson, 1873; P. m. anceus Cramer, [1779]; P. m. thunbergi Siebold, 1824; P. m. lowii Druce, 1873; P. m. oceani Doherty, 1891; P. m. merapu Doherty, 1891; P. m. pryeri Rothschild, 1895; P. m. clathratus Rothschild; P. m. subclathratus Fruhstorfer; P. m. coeruleus van Eecke; P. m. perlucidus Fruhstorfer; P. m. heronus Fruhstorfer, 1902; P. m. tanahsahi Eliot, 1982

Synonyms
- Princeps memnon

= Papilio memnon =

Great Mormon

Species of butterfly

Papilio memnon, the great Mormon, is a large butterfly native to southern Asia that belongs to the swallowtail family. It is widely distributed and has thirteen subspecies. The female is polymorphic and with mimetic forms.

== Range ==
Its range includes north-eastern India (including Sikkim, Assam and Nagaland), Nepal, Bangladesh, Myanmar, Nicobar Islands, Andaman Islands (stragglers only), western, southern and eastern China (including Hainan), Taiwan, southern Japan including Ryukyu Islands, Thailand, Laos, Vietnam, Kampuchea, Malaysia and Indonesia (Sumatra, Mentawai Islands, Nias, Batu, Simeulue, Bangka, Java, Kalimantan and the Lesser Sunda Islands).

== Status ==
This species is common and not threatened. The cultivation of citrus all over Southern Asia provides an abundance of food plants.

== Description and polymorphy ==
The butterfly is large with a 120 to 150 millimetres (4.7 to 5.9 in) span. It has four male and many female forms, the females being highly polymorphic and many of them being mimics of unpalatable butterflies. This species has been studied extensively for understanding the genetic basis for polymorphy and Batesian mimicry. As many as twenty-six female forms are reported.

=== Typical form agenor ===
- Male. Tailless, above deep blue to black. It may or may not have red streak on the forewing at the base of the cell.
- Female. Tailless. Upperside forewing ground colour sepia, streaked with greyish white. The basal third part of the cell is red and is touched outwardly with white. Upper hindwing is blue black. It has five to seven yellow or white discal patches.
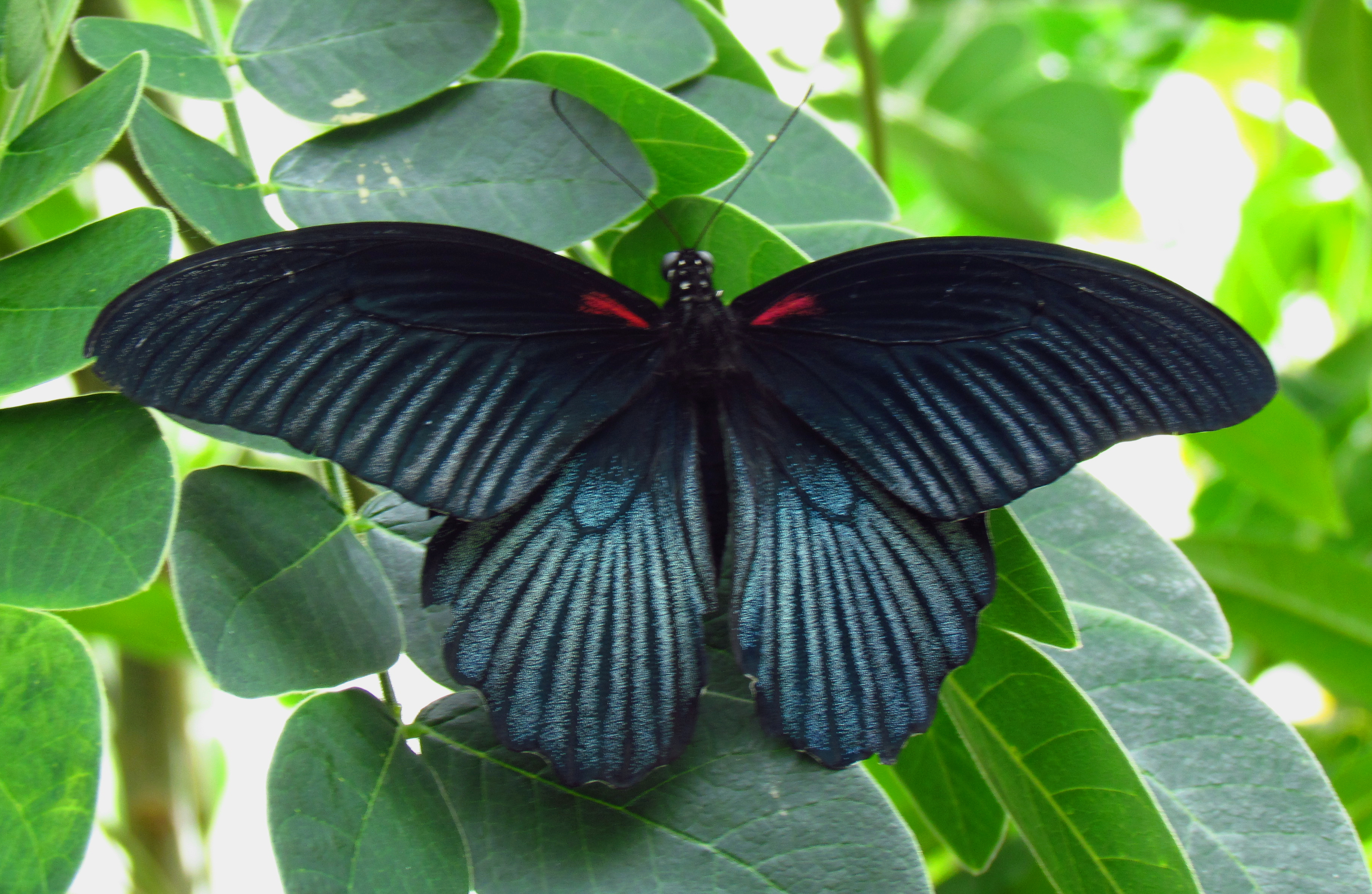
Male agenor

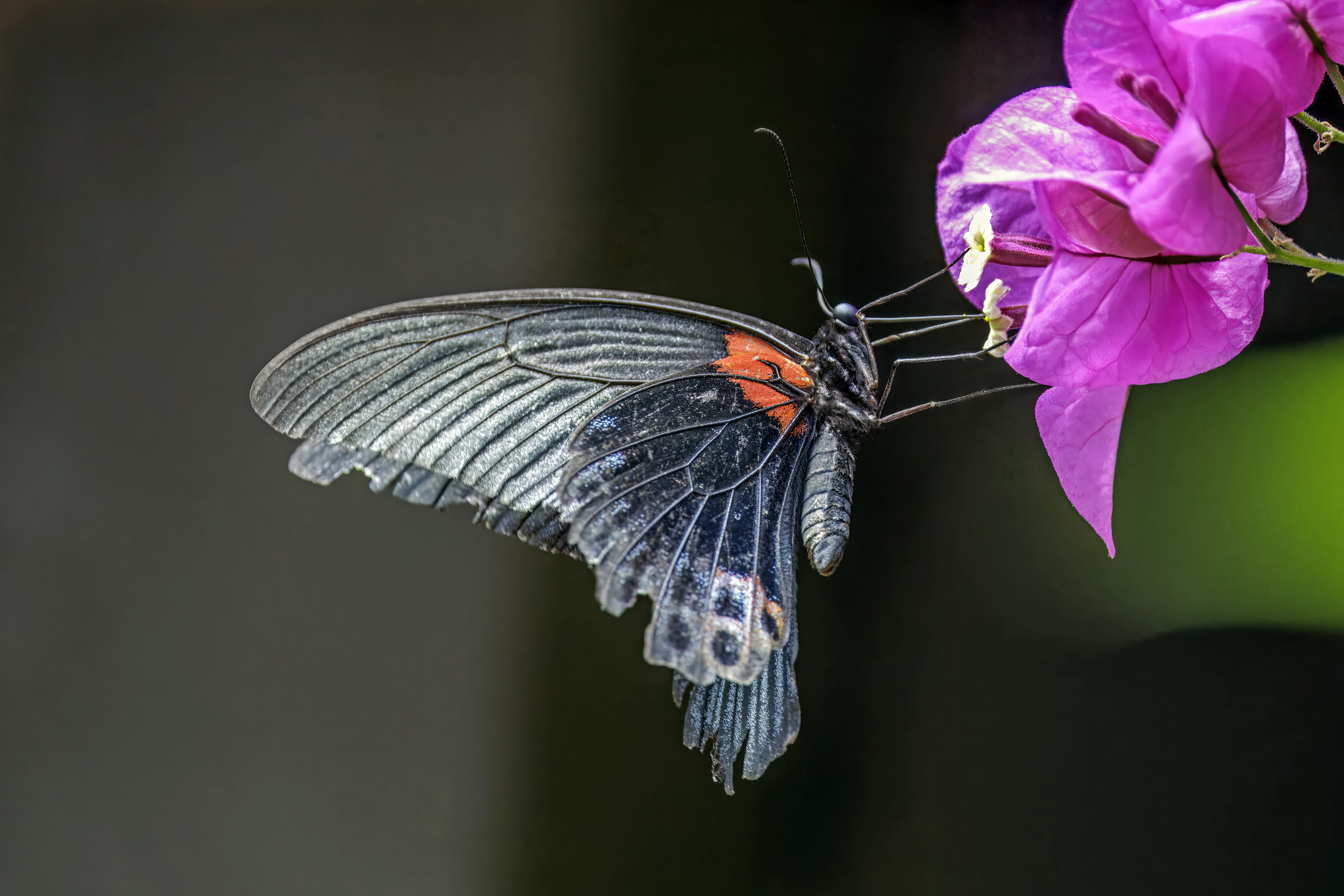
Male agenor, Laos

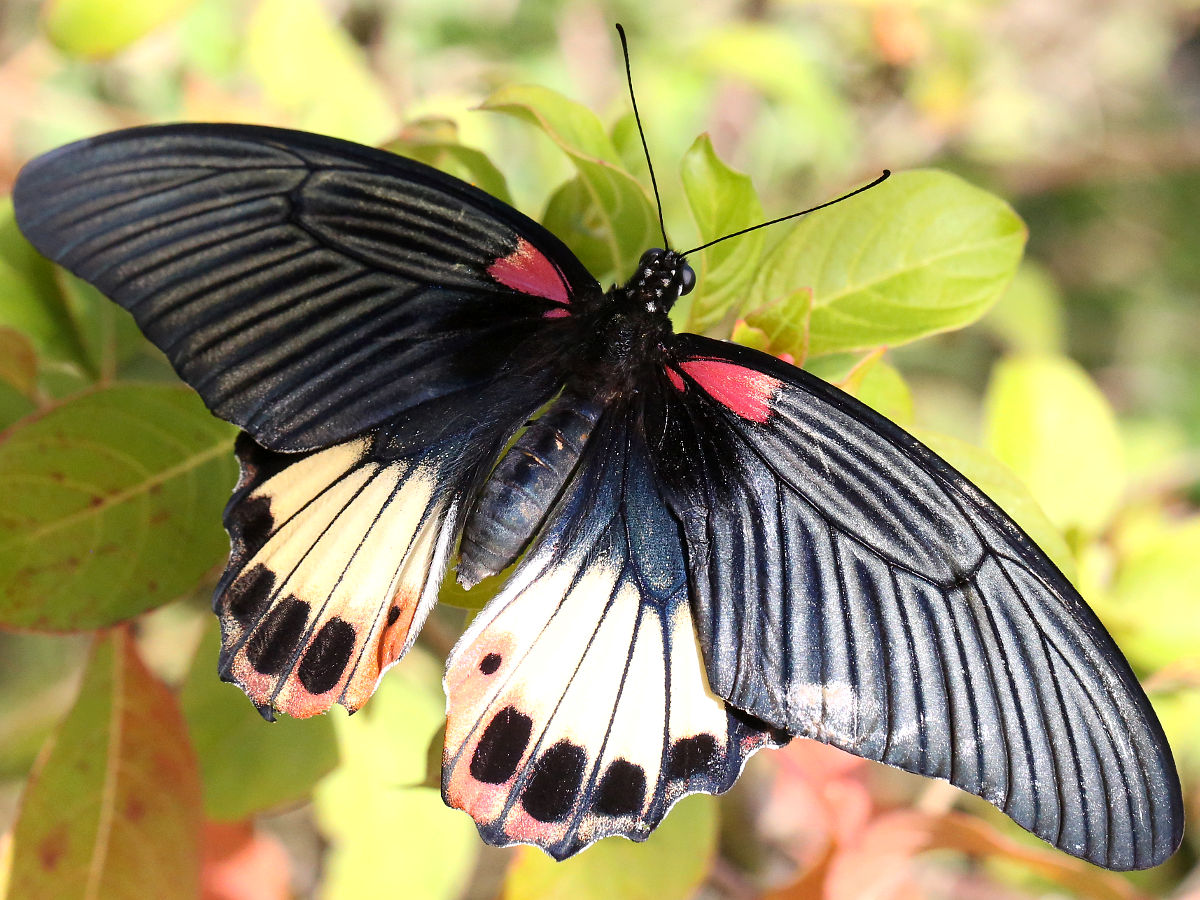
Female agenor, Thailand

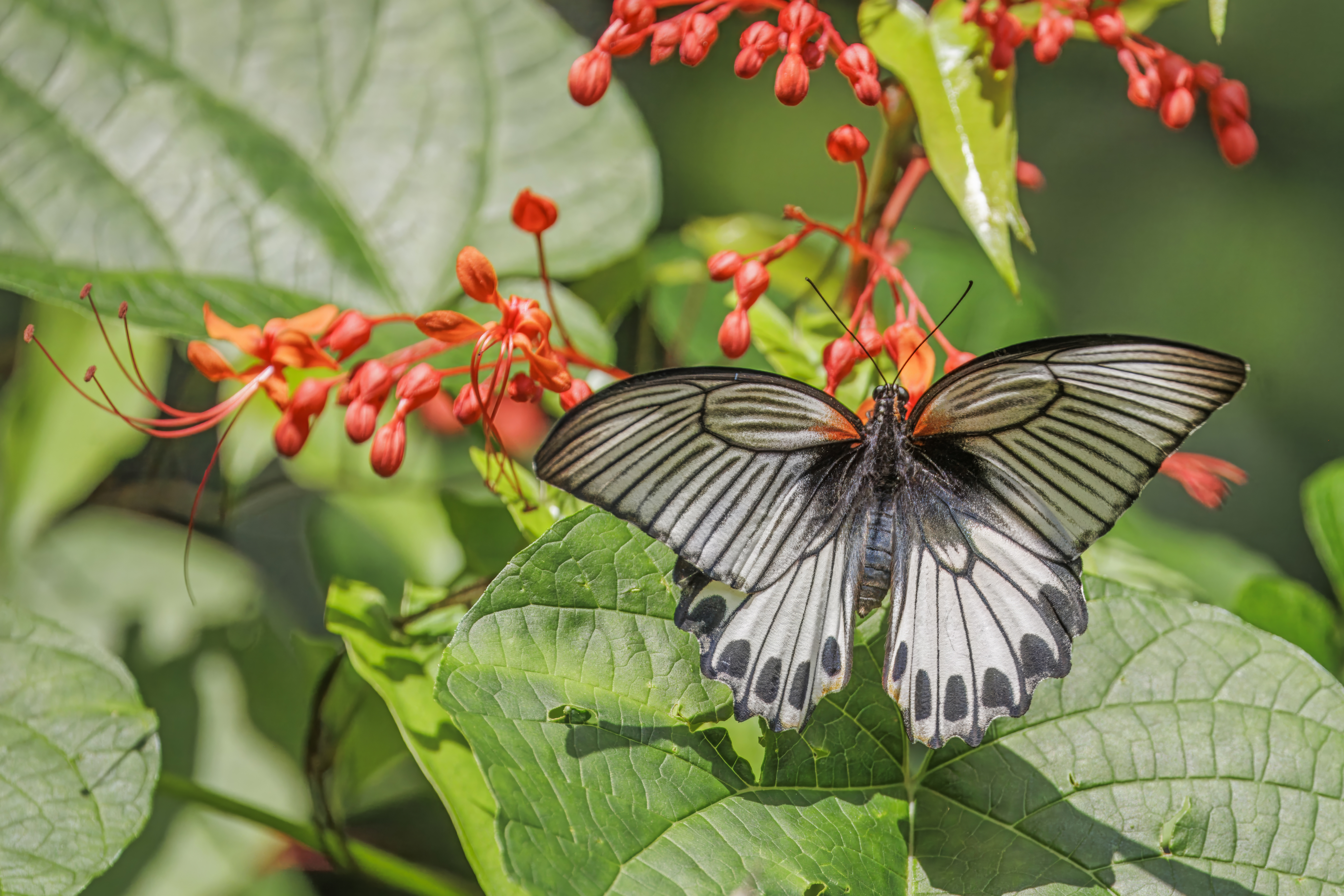
Female agenor, Hong Kong

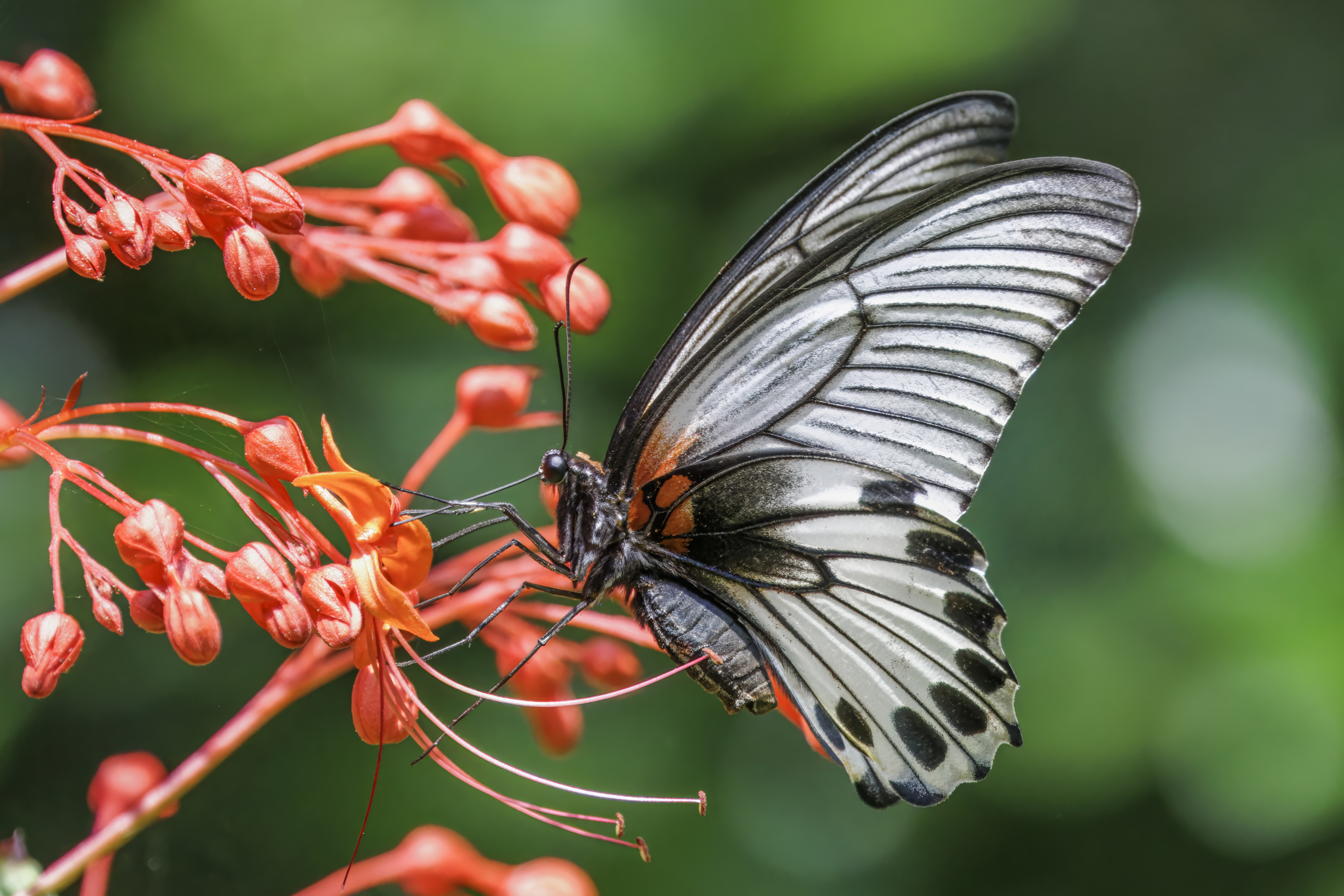
Female agenor, Hong Kong

=== Female form butlerianus ===
- Tailless. Resembles the typical male. Both wings are dark sepia. The forewing has a white area on the inner margin. The hindwing is scaled with blue.
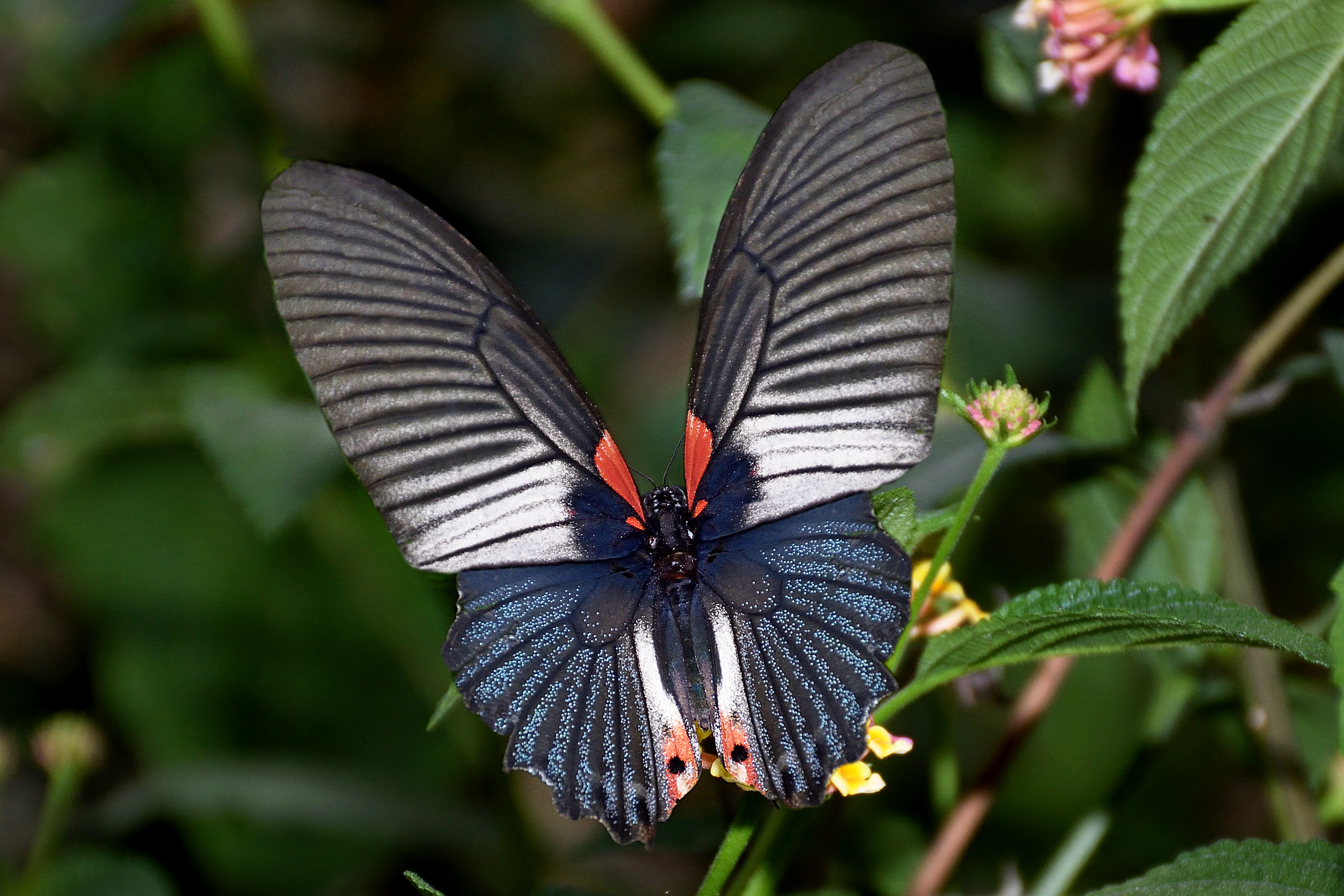
Female butlerianus, India

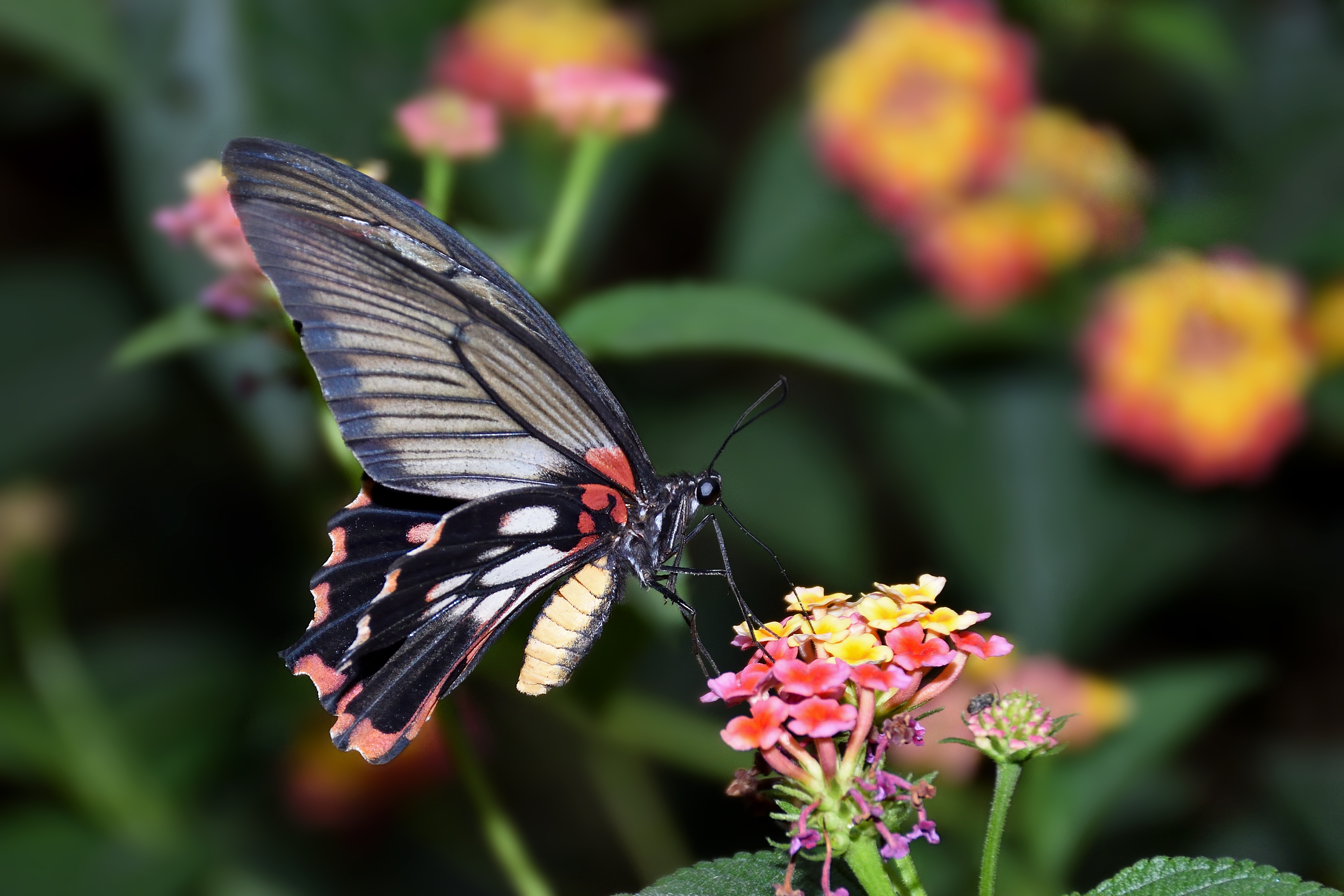
Female butlerianus, India

=== Female form alcanor ===
- Tailed. The sides of the abdomen are yellow.
- Upperside forewing greyish brown with veins and streaks between them black. The cell is red at the base. There is a velvety black patch at the bases of veins 1 and 2 of the upperside forewing.
- Upperside hindwing is black with part of the cell white. There are white streaks around it. The tornus is red with a large black spot. There is a row of red terminal spots between the vein.
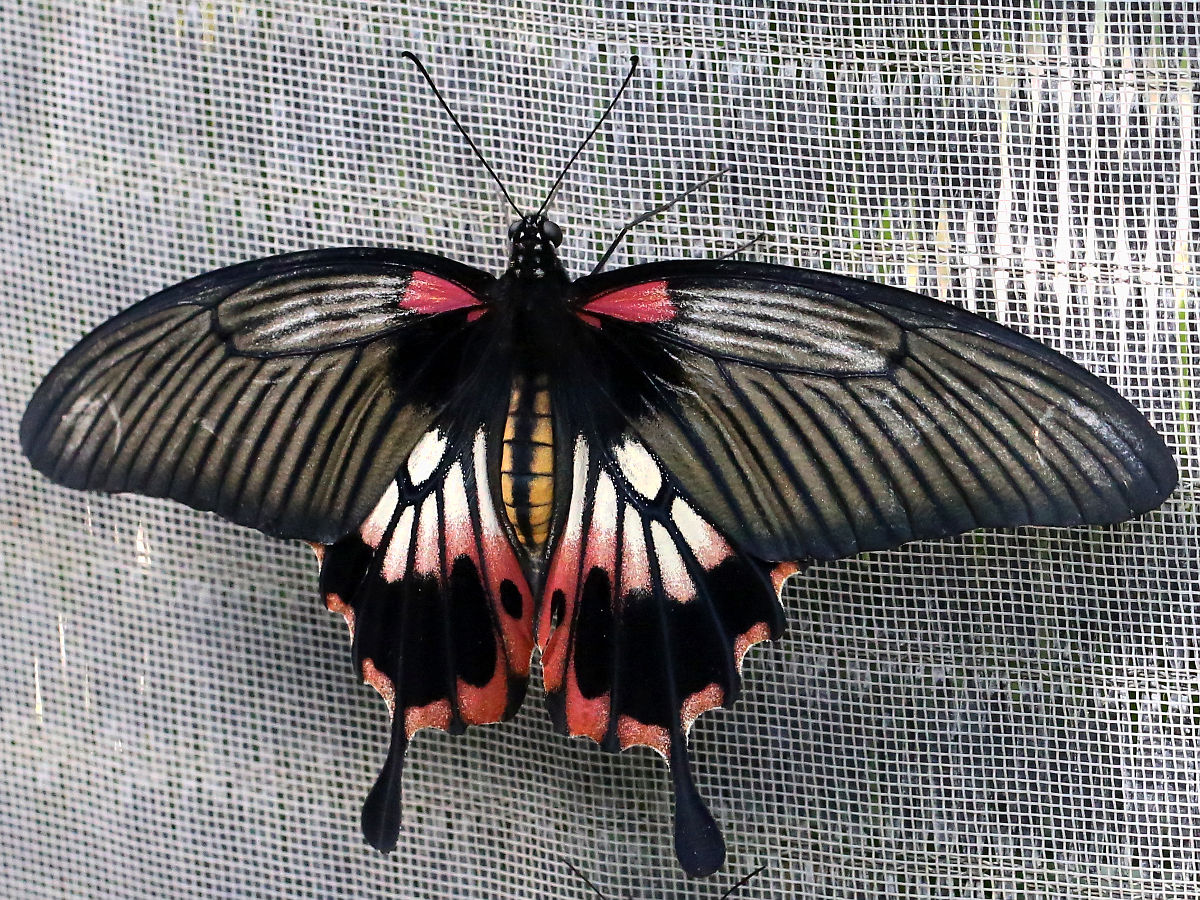
Female alcanor, Thailand

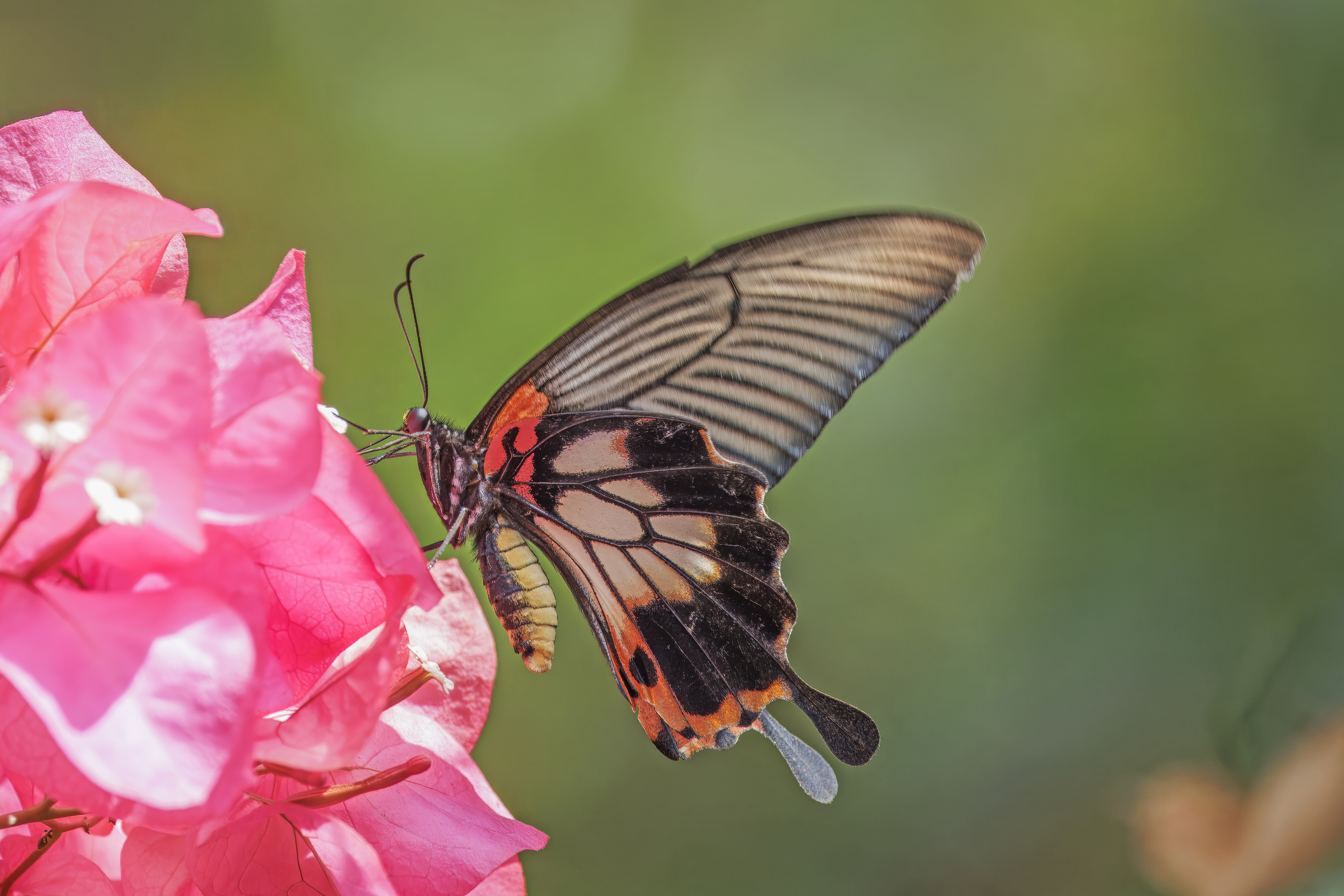
Female alcanor, Laos

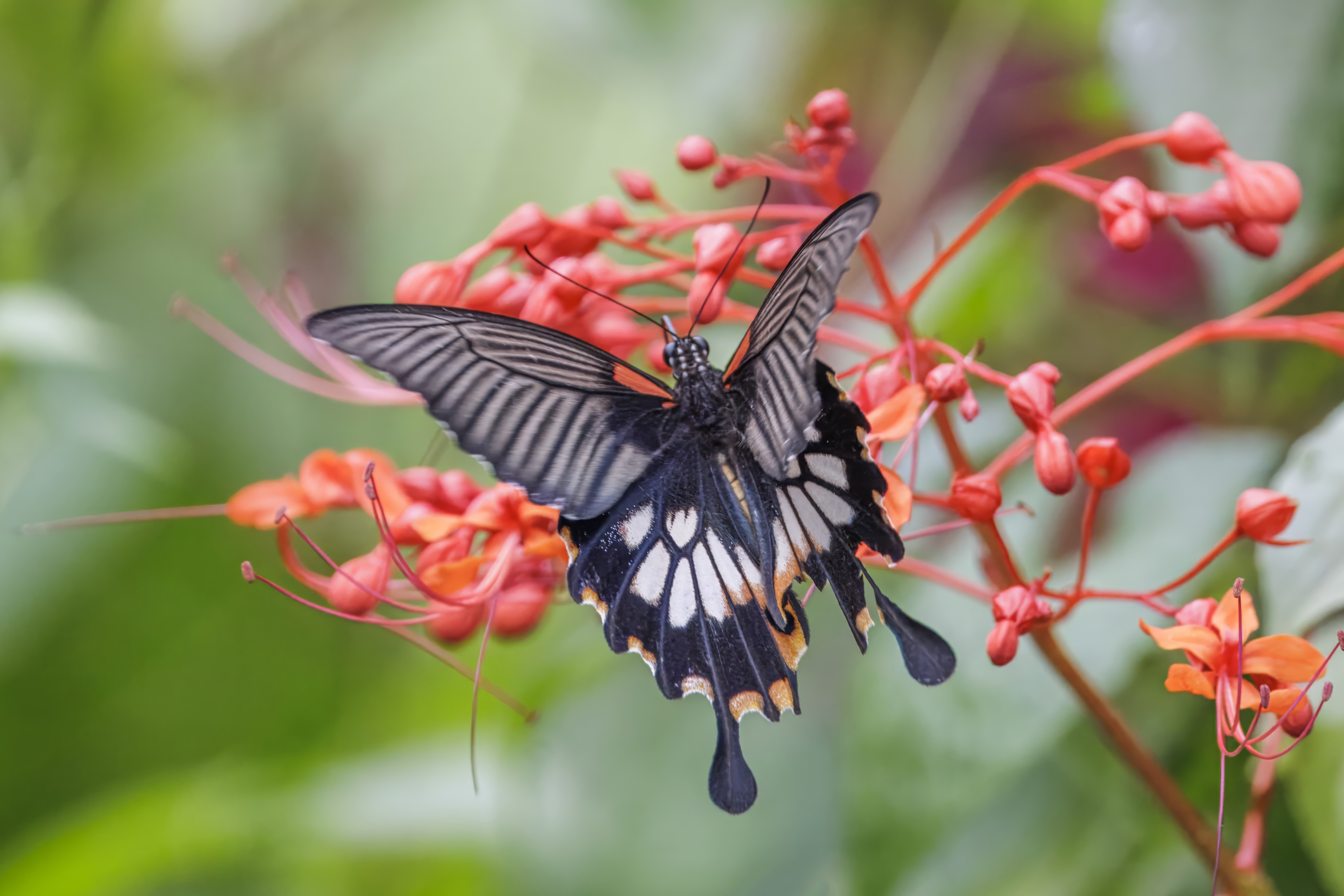
Female alcanor, Hong Kong

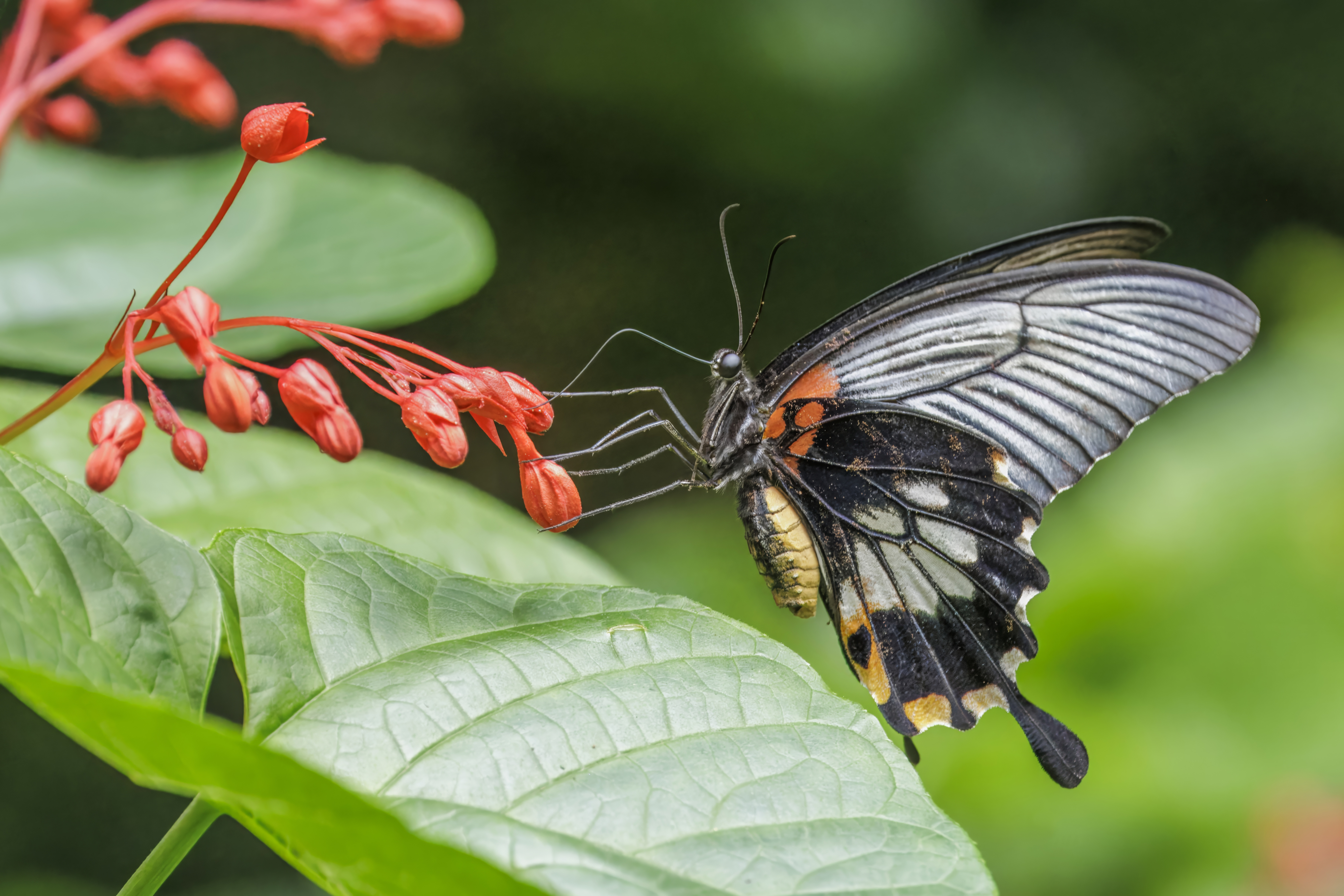
Female alcanor, Hong Kong

=== Male and female form polymnestoroides ===
- Tailless.
- Male. Upperside hindwing and forewing have short blue discal stripes.
- Female. The upperside forewing is sepia with pale grey streaks amongst the veins. The base of the cell is red. The upperside hindwing is velvety brown with a blue discal area and has black spots, as in the case of the blue Mormon (P. polymnestor), which it mimics.

== Habitat ==
This species flies up to 2,100 metres (6,900 ft) in the Himalayas, but is most common at low elevations.

== Behaviour ==
This butterfly is found in forest clearings. It is very common and is also seen amongst human habitation. It visits flowers of Poinsettia, Jasminum, Lantana, Canna and Salvia. It usually flies 2 to 4 metres (6 ft 7 in to 13 ft 1 in) above the ground. The butterfly is known to mud-puddle. The males are much more common than females. The female forms butlerianus and alcanor are especially uncommon.

== Life cycle ==
The larva resembles that of the common Mormon (P. polytes), being green with whitish markings. It is heavily parasitised.

== Gallery ==
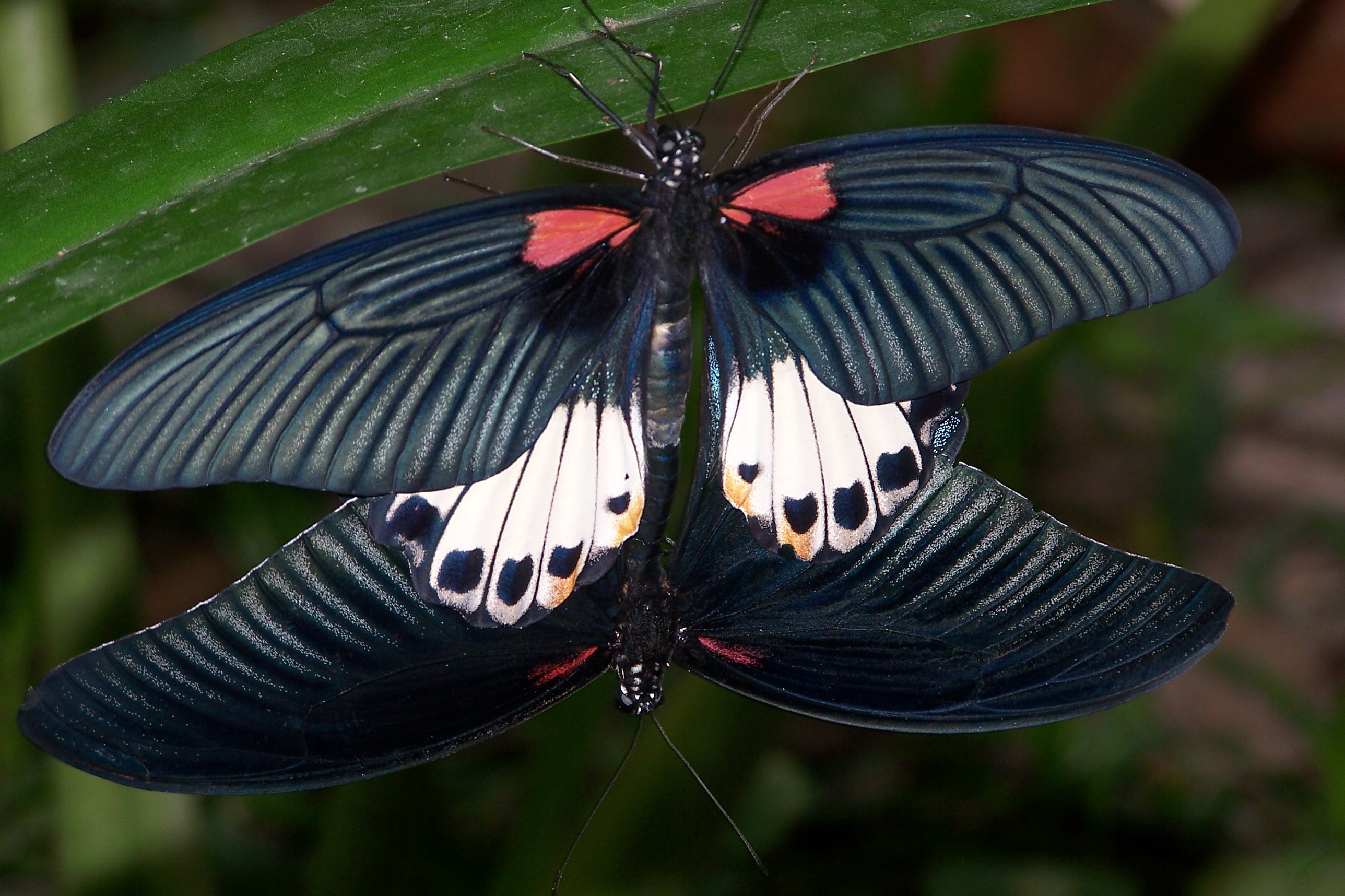
Mating pair

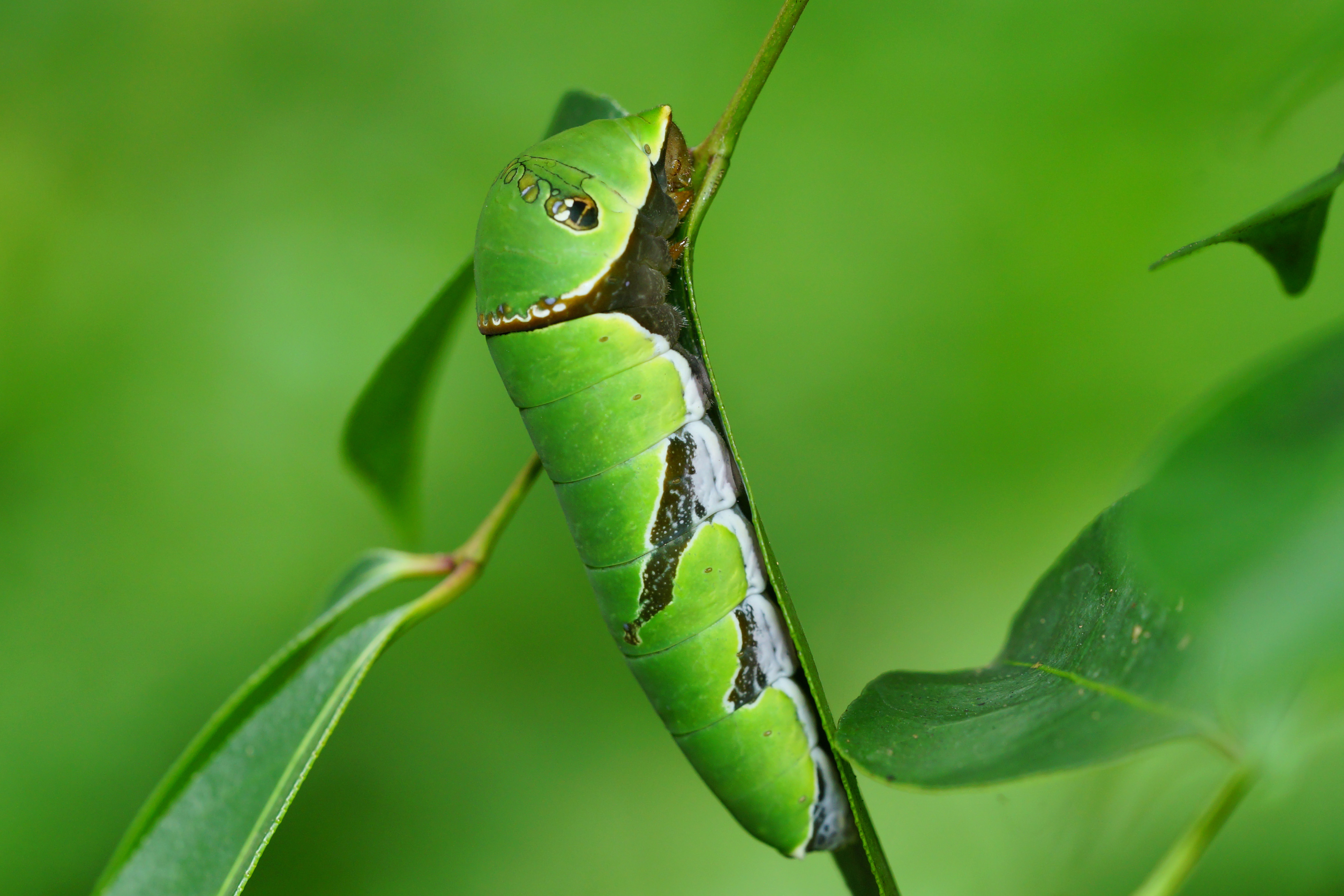
Larva

== See also ==
- List of butterflies of India (Papilionidae)
