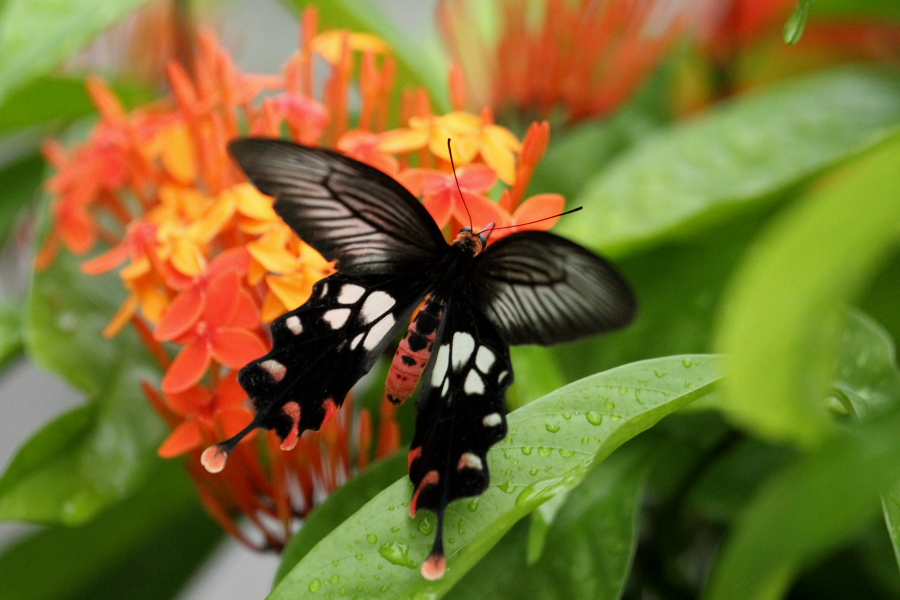

Conservation status
- Near Threatened (IUCN 3.1)

Scientific classification
- Domain: Eukaryota
- Kingdom: Animalia
- Phylum: Arthropoda
- Class: Insecta
- Order: Lepidoptera
- Family: Papilionidae
- Genus: Losaria
- Species: L. rhodifer

Binomial name
- Losaria rhodifer (Butler, 1876)

Synonyms
- Atrophaneura rhodifer

= Losaria rhodifer =

Andaman clubtail

Species of butterfly

Losaria rhodifer, the Andaman clubtail, is a rare species of the swallowtail family, Papilionidae, native to India.

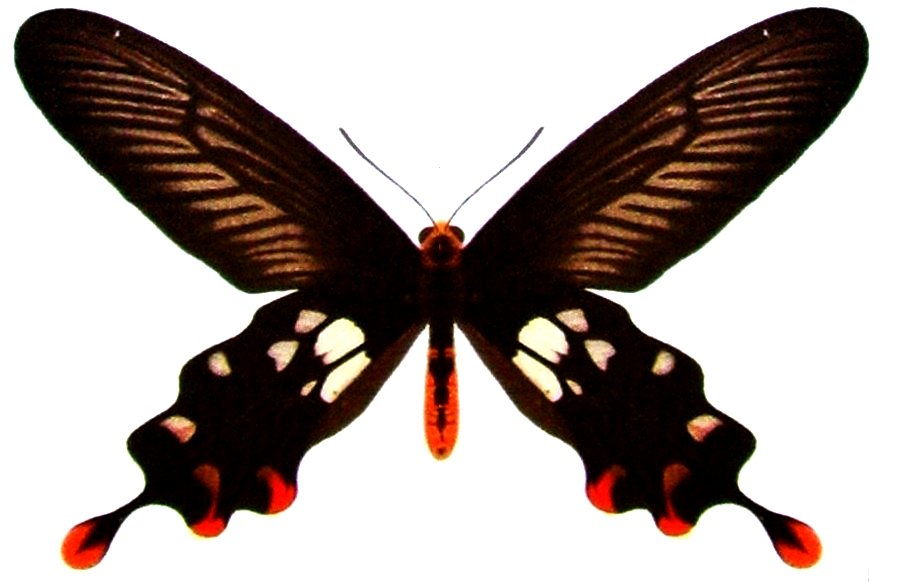
Losaria rhodifer

== Distribution ==
The butterfly is endemic and restricted to the Andaman Islands in the Bay of Bengal.

== Description ==
Male differs from Losaria coon as follows:

Ground-colour a rich velvety-black, much darker than in doubledayi; on the fore wing the pale streaks extend only into the apex of the cell. On the hind wing the medial white markings are much shorter, the spots at base of interspaces 4 and 5 and generally the spot in interspace 7 absent; the subterminal and terminal vermilion spots are much larger, and the tail is vermilion on its apical spatulate portion. Antennae, head, thorax and abdomen as in doubledayi, but the head entirely vermilion-red. Female closely resembles the male, fore wing broader, red markings on hind wing more crimson than vermilion-red, often dull and irrorated slightly with black scales; medial white markings more extensive, the white mark in interspace 1 extends well below vein 1.

== Status ==
It has been described as not rare but much work needs to be done to clarify its exact status and distribution. It is not listed as threatened.

== Taxonomy ==
There are no subspecies.

== See also ==
- Papilionidae
- List of butterflies of India
- List of butterflies of India (Papilionidae)
