= Satsang (disambiguation) =

Satsang is an audience with a Satguru for religious instruction.

Satsang or Satsanga may also refer to these spiritual movements originating in India:

- Neo-Advaita, also known as the Satsang movement/Satsanga movement, inspired by Ramana Maharshi
- Satsang (Deoghar), founded by Thakur Anukulchandra
  - Satsang Ashram, its headquarters in Deoghar, Jharkhand, India
- Radha Soami or Radha Soami Satsang, founded by Huzur Soami Ji Maharaj
  - Radha Soami Satsang Beas, its organization centred in Punjab, India
  - Radha Soami Satsang Sabha of Dayalbagh, Agra, India.
  - Radha Swami Satsang, Dinod, its organization centred in Dinod, Haryana, India
- Ramashram Satsang, Mathura, founded by Guru Maharaj in Mathura, Uttar Pradesh, India
- Ruhani Satsang, founded by Kirpal Singh in Delhi, India
- Yogoda Satsanga Society of India, founded by Paramahansa Yogananda in Kolkata, West Bengal, India

== See also ==
- Satsangi, a follower of Swaminarayan
