= Satsang Ashram =

Headquarters of the Satsang movement, in Deoghar, India

Satsang Ashram, Deoghar
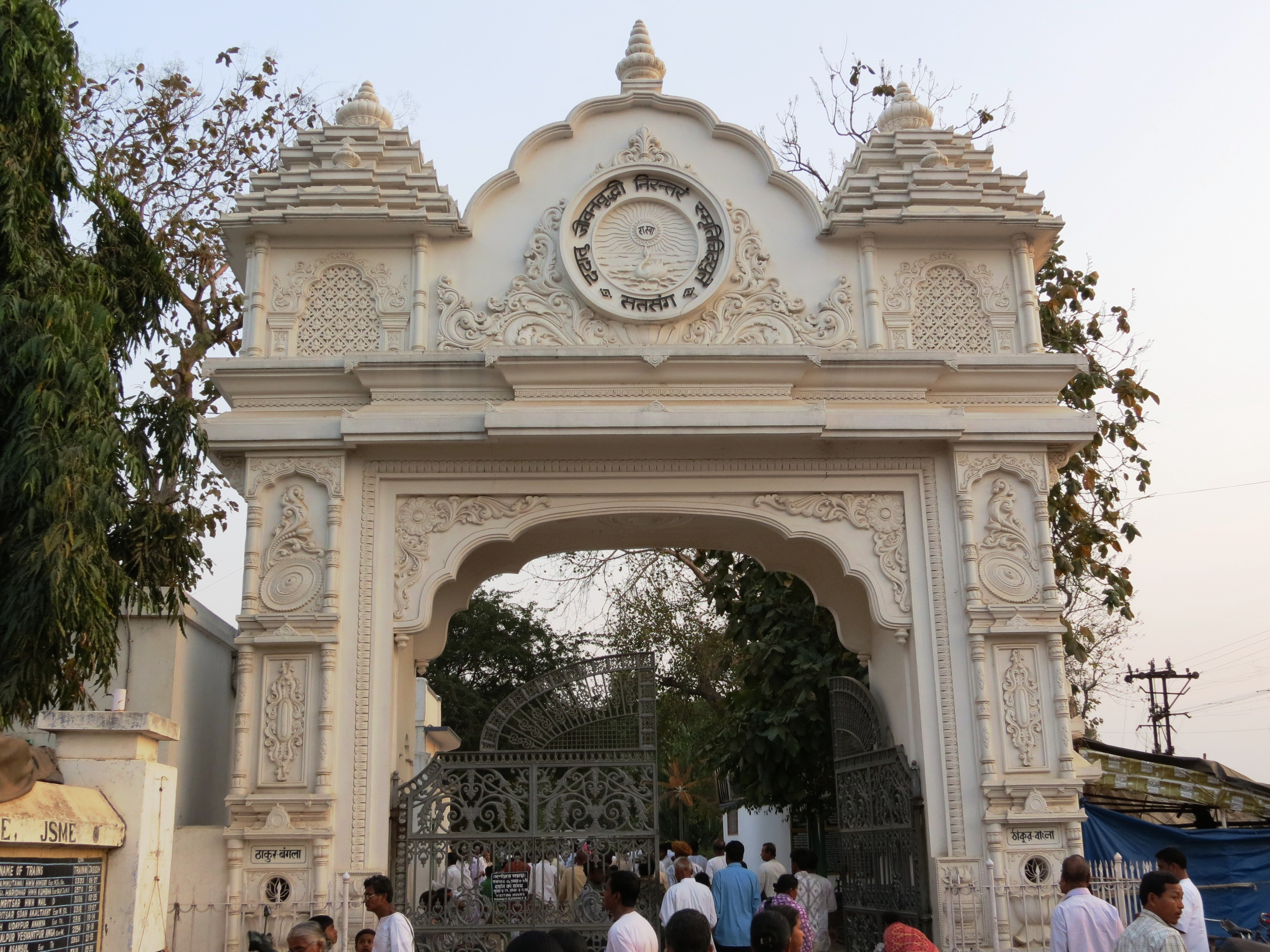
- Main entrance
- Founder: Thakur Anukulchandra
- Type: Religious organisation
- Purpose: Spirituality and Philanthropy.
- Headquarters: Deoghar, Jharkhand, India
- Coordinates: 24.48°N 86.67°E
- Region served: Worldwide
- Website: www.satsang.org.in

Satsang Ashram is the headquarters of the Satsang movement started by Thakur Anukulchandra in India and across the world. The Satsang Ashram has become an of attraction in Deoghar for all kinds of people in the society. The township surrounding the ashram is known as Satsang Nagar and has a dedicated Indian railways passenger halt for the ease of devotees visiting the place.

== Establishment of the Ashram ==
The establishment of the Satsang Ashram at Deoghar was started after Thakur Anukulchandra moved to Deoghar from his birthplace in the Pabna District of East Bengal (now Bangladesh) on 2 September 1946. Satsang, as an organization was registered after India got its independence and partition, under the Societies Registration act of 1860.

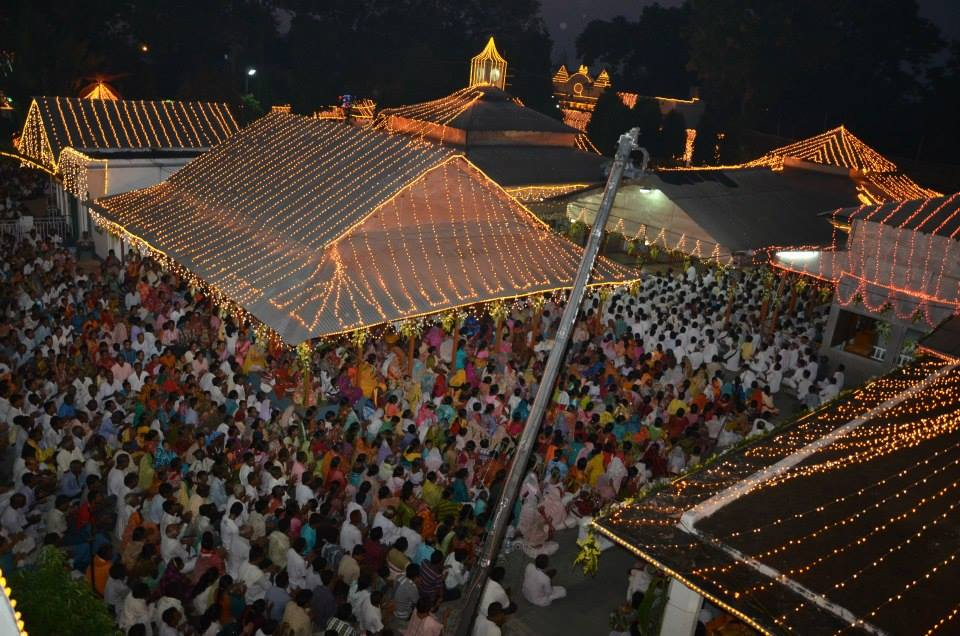
Prayer in Satsang Ashram, Deoghar)

== Institutions and centers ==
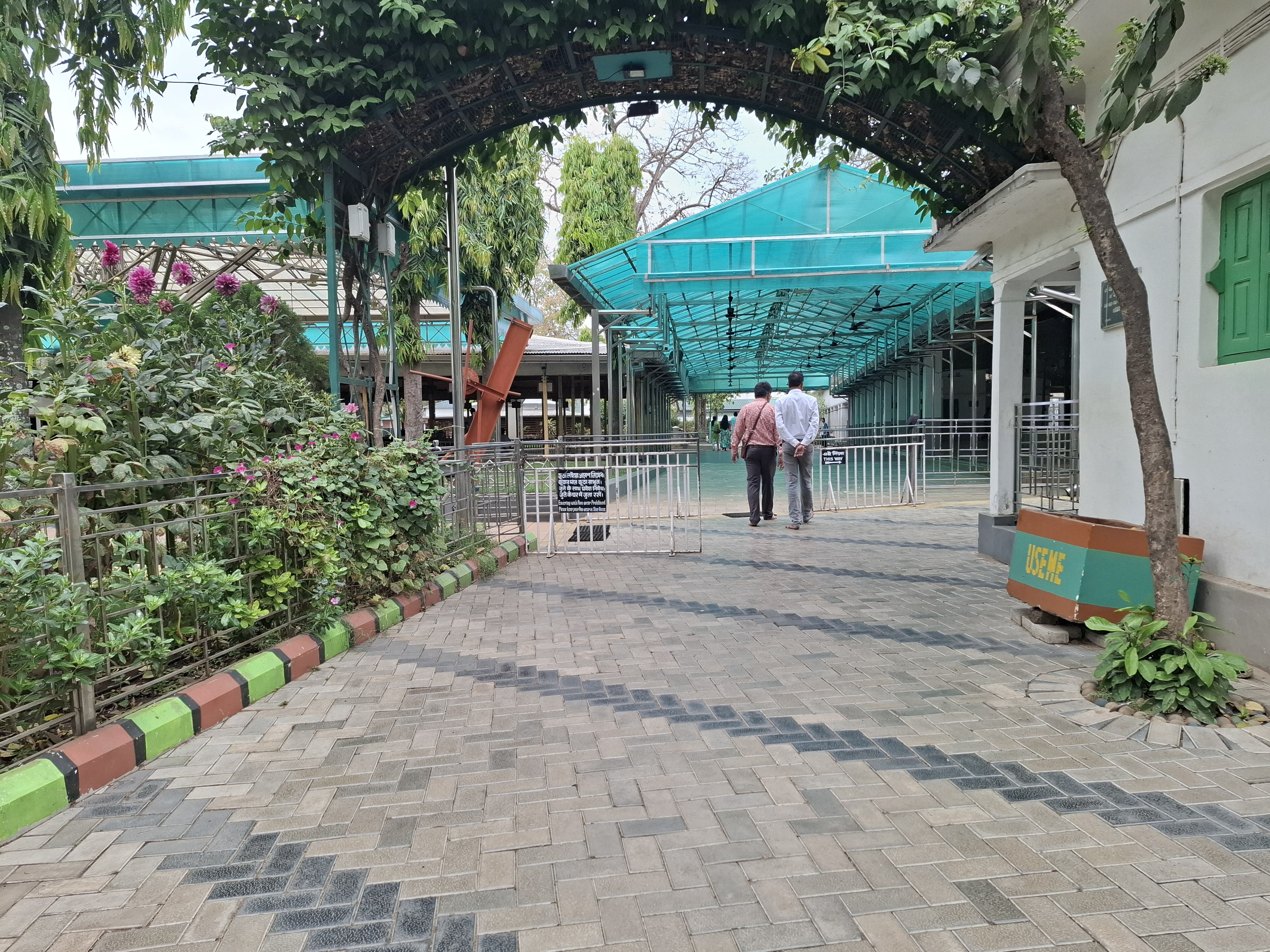
Satsang Ashram campus

As a part of the Satsang movement, various activities are carried out for the service of the devotees and people in general. Various philanthropic and social works are conducted by different centers and institutions established in the Ashram premises.

=== Satsang Philanthropy ===
It is the main administrative facility of Satsang. All the activities in the Ashram is carried out under the jurisdiction of the Satsang Philanthropy. The Philanthropy department is well equipped with an advanced computerized system.

Controversy: all devotees of ashram send donation(istavriti) on monthly basis. It is believed to be used for philanthropy. But, there is no audit report publicly available for the utilisation of this fund.

=== Dutadeepti Satsang Charitable Hospital ===
This hospital is a charitable hospital and provides free health services to the general public throughout the year.

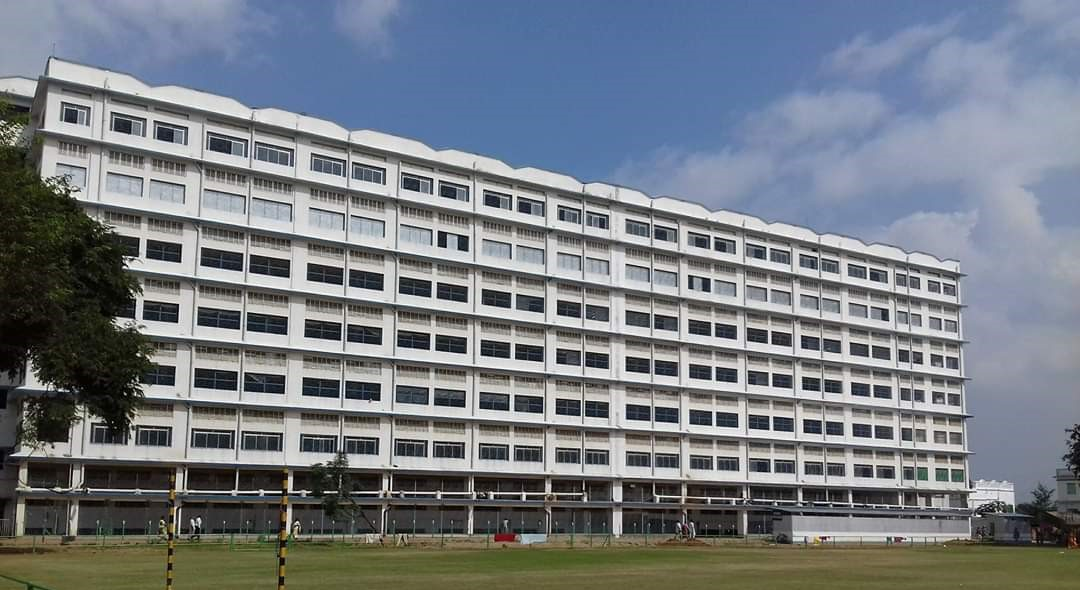
Anandabazar Bhavan, Satsang Ashram

=== Anandabazar (Community Kitchen) ===
This free community kitchen known as Anandabazar was introduced by the mother of Thakur Anukulchandra, Monmohini Devi. It offers very simple lunch and dinner two times daily to the Ashramites and devotees visiting the Ashram. Due to the growing number of devotees and visitors, a seven storied building named ‘Anandabazar Bhavan’ has been constructed where thousands of people can take Prasad (meal) at any given time.

=== Satsang Publishing House ===
This publishing company publishes various books and literatures compiled from the sayings and discussions with Thakur Anukulchandra at different times. The publishing house brings out five monthly magazines, ‘Alochana’ in Bengali, ‘Sattwati’ in Hindi, ‘Urjana’ in Odia, ‘Ligate’ in English and ‘Agamvani’ in Assamese.

=== Satsang Rashaishana Mandir (Satsang Chemical Works) ===
Thakur Anukulchandra being a doctor himself, used to give herbal and Ayurvedic medicines often accompanied by their respective formulae for the treatment of people. To preserve those formulae and to prepare herbal medicines, the Rashaishana mandir was established. Various medicines under the trademark of Satsang is widely used by the general public.

=== Schools and College ===
Satsang runs two schools namely, Tapovan Vidyalay and Vinapani Vidyamandir separately for boys and girls respectively. Both schools have their separate premises with hostel facility. The Satsang college named as ‘Amardyuti Sandhya College’ was established in 1969 and is currently run by the government.

=== Museums ===
A museum named ‘Memoria’ has been established at the Satsang Ashram in the memory of Thakur Anukulchandra. It displays the belongings of Thakur Anukulchandra and photographs of events and meetings with eminent personalities with him. Another museum is dedicated to his eldest son, Amarendranath Chakravarty (Sree Sree Borda).

=== Other centers and facilities ===
Apart from the above institutions, Satsang Ashram has other centers and facilities like Ved Bhavan, dedicated for Vedic studies and recitations, Satsang Library, Kristibandav Natyashilpam (music and dramatic institution), Satsang Press, Satsang Carpentry, Engineering and Mechanical Workshop, Satsang garage, Goshala (Cowshed) etc.

=== Rain water harvesting system ===
Due to increase in the number of devotees and tourists visiting the Satsang Ashram, water scarcity became an acute problem. So, The administrators and workers of the ashram developed a promising rain water harvesting system entirely on their own throughout the ashram premises. The project is still ongoing and being upgraded on a regular basis.

== Functions and activities ==
A number of functions are celebrated in the Satsang Ashram throughout the year. The birth anniversaries of Thakur Anukulchandra, his wife (Sree Sree Boromaa), his eldest son (Sree Sree Borda) and current Acharyadev are being celebrated in the Satsang Ashram. Other festivals related to the life events of Thakur Anukulchandra, Ritwik conferences are also being celebrated. Lacs of devotees from around the country and abroad arrive at the Ashram to attend the celebrations. Eminent personalities usually attend various Utsavs and functions at the Satsang Ashram.

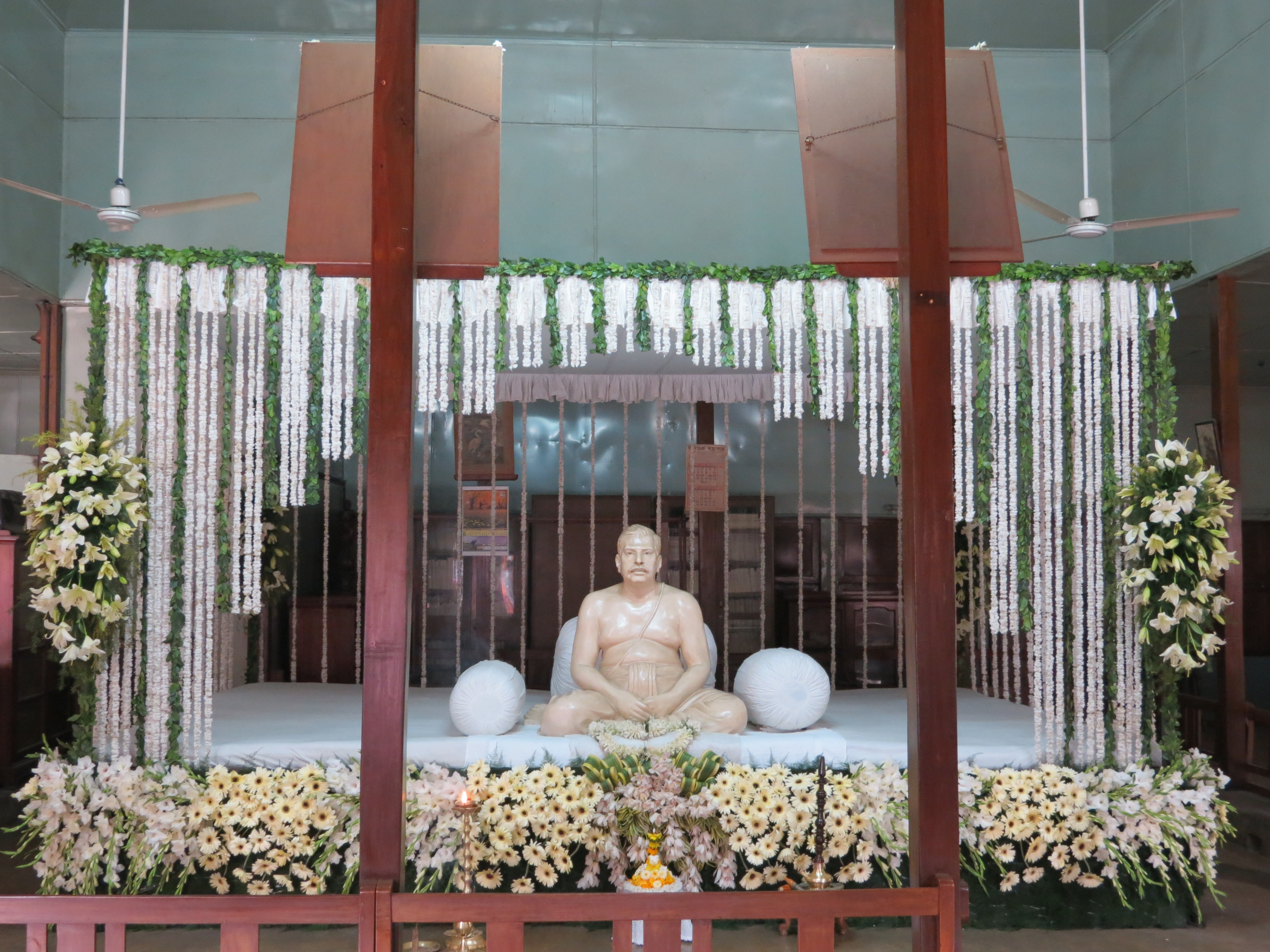
Statue of Sree Sree Thakur in Thakur bungalow, Satsang Ashram

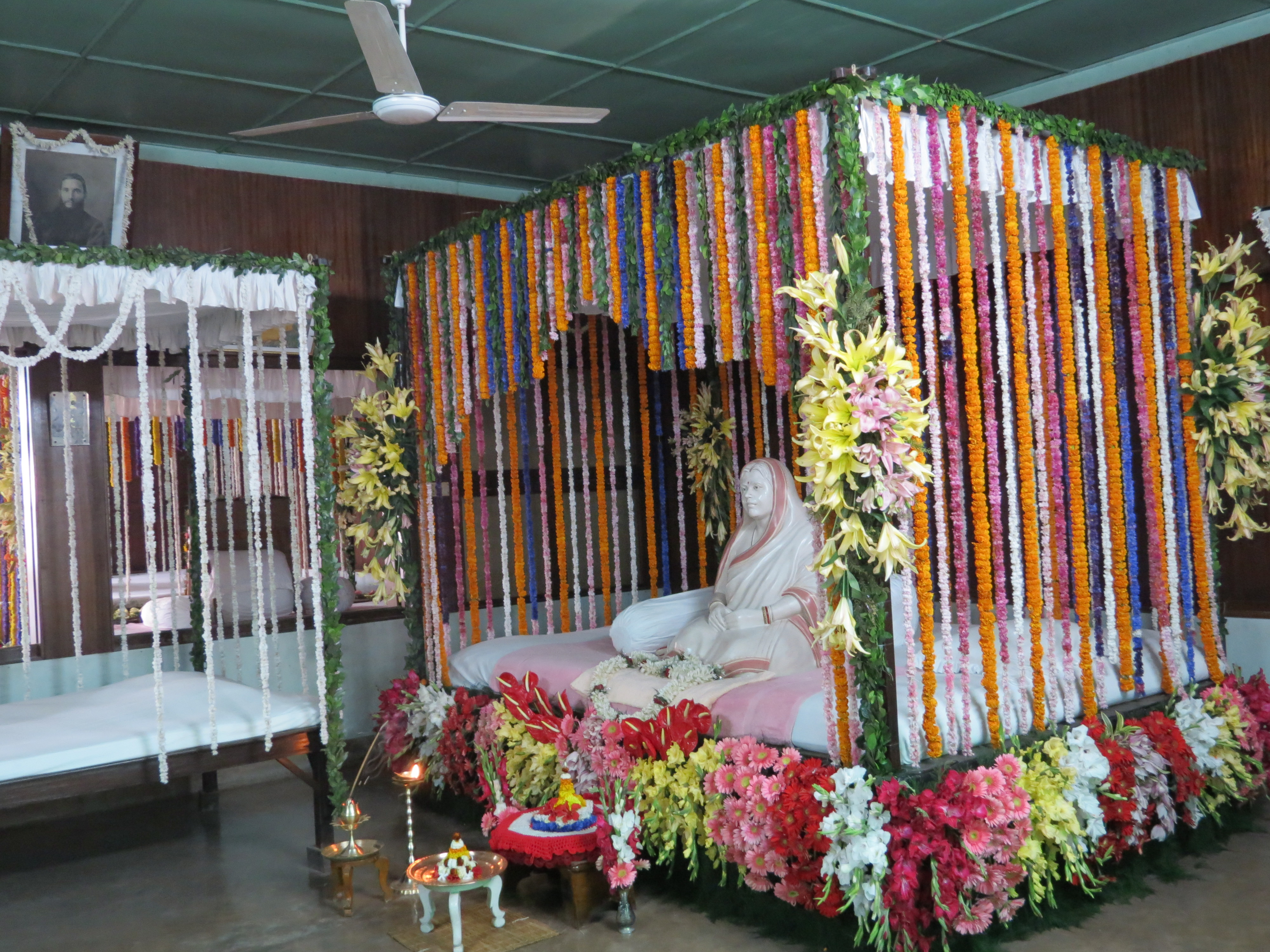
Statue of Sree Sree Boro'maa at Thakur Bungalow, Satsang Ashram

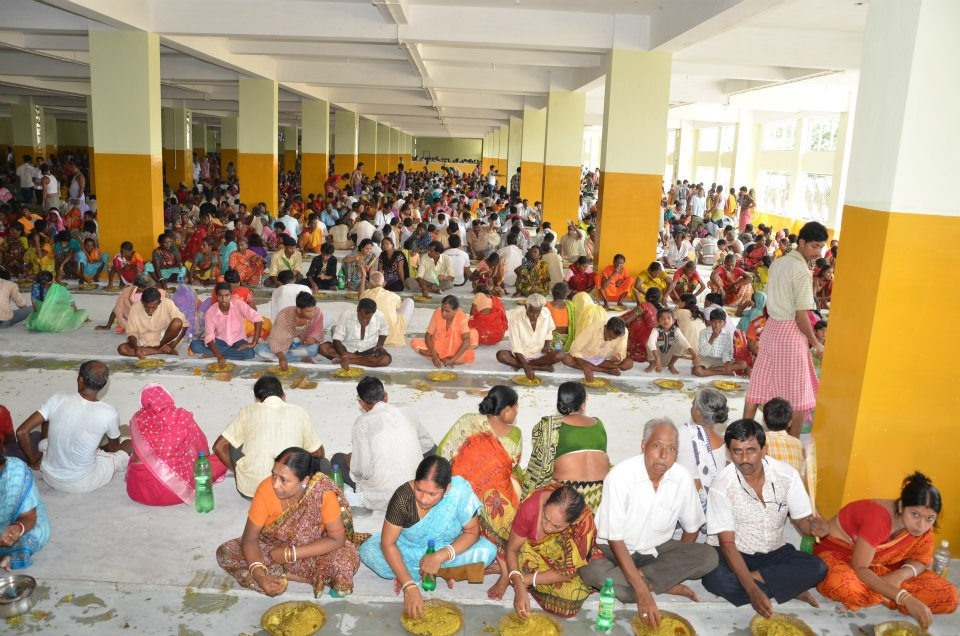
Devotees having Prasad in Anandabazar

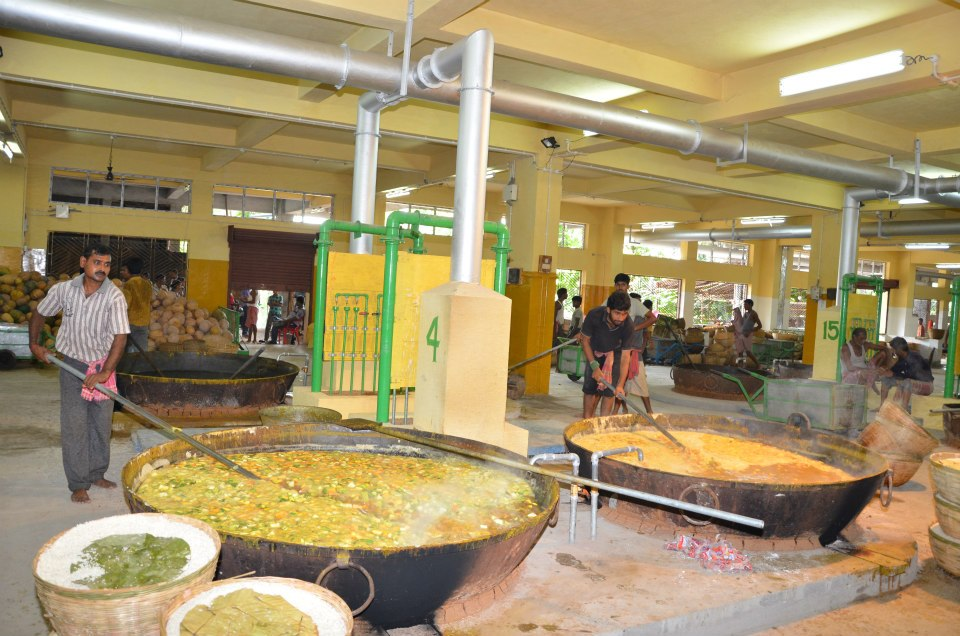
Food preparation in Anandabazar

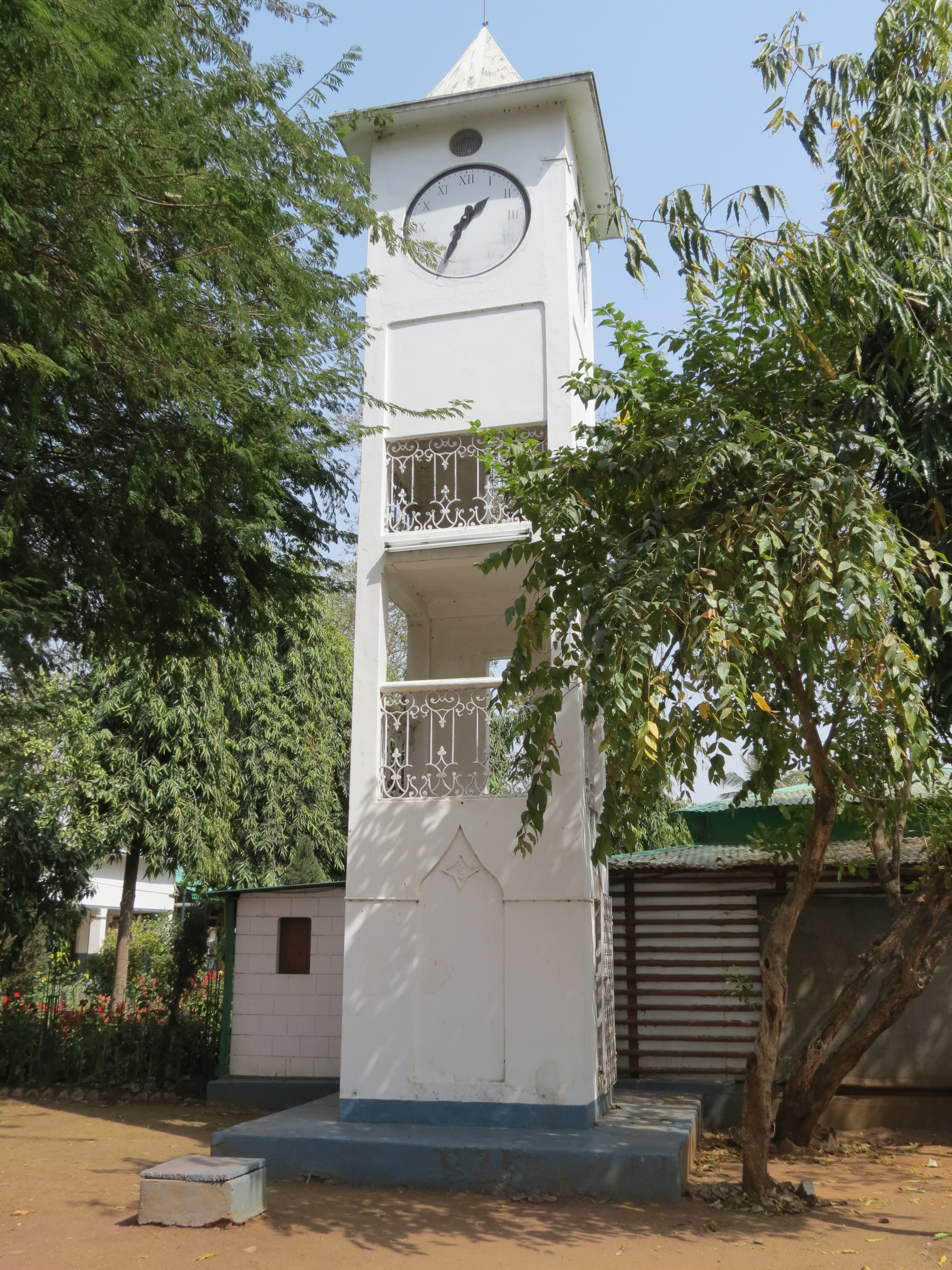
Clock tower in Satsang Ashram

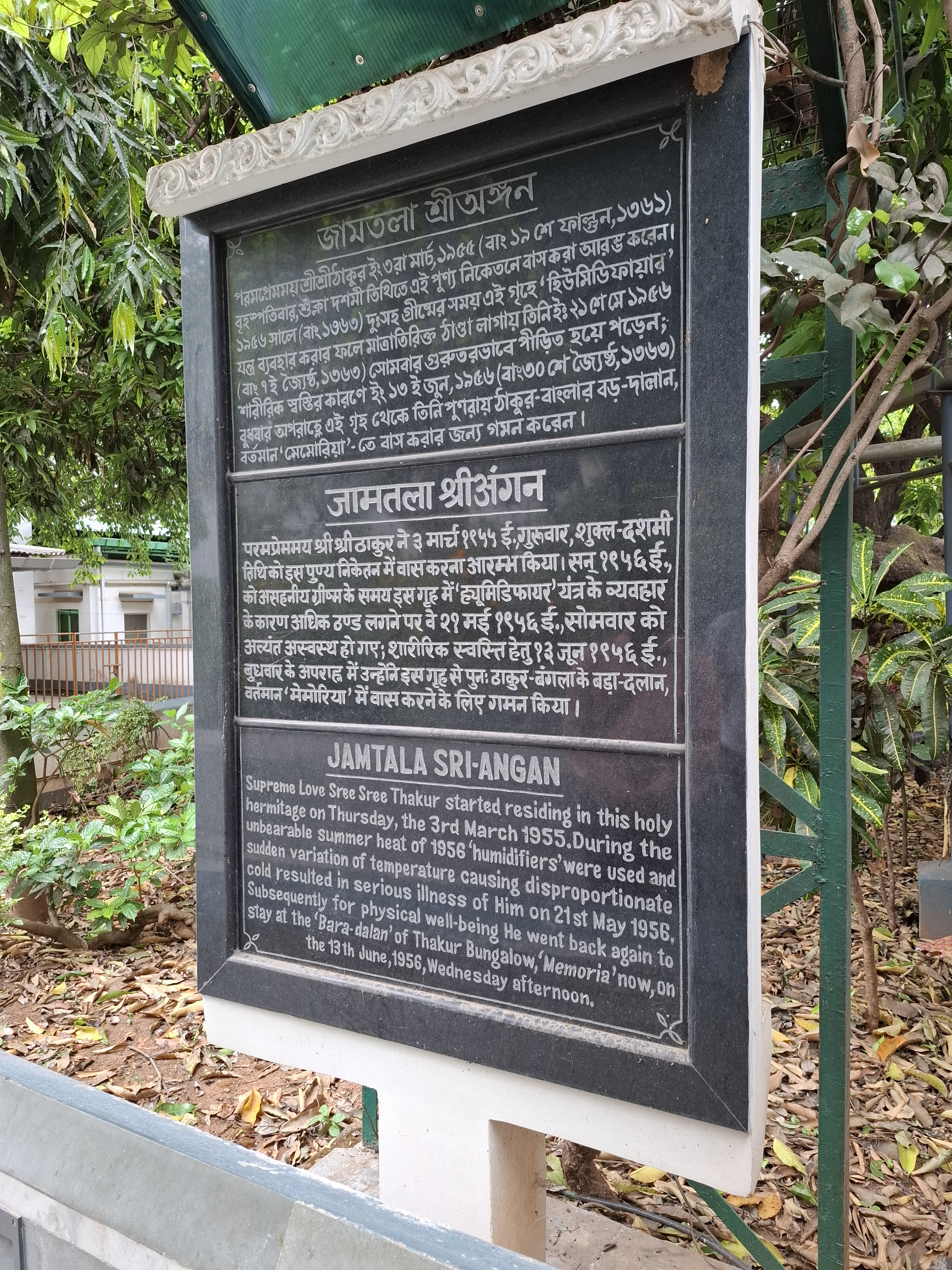
Shri Angan

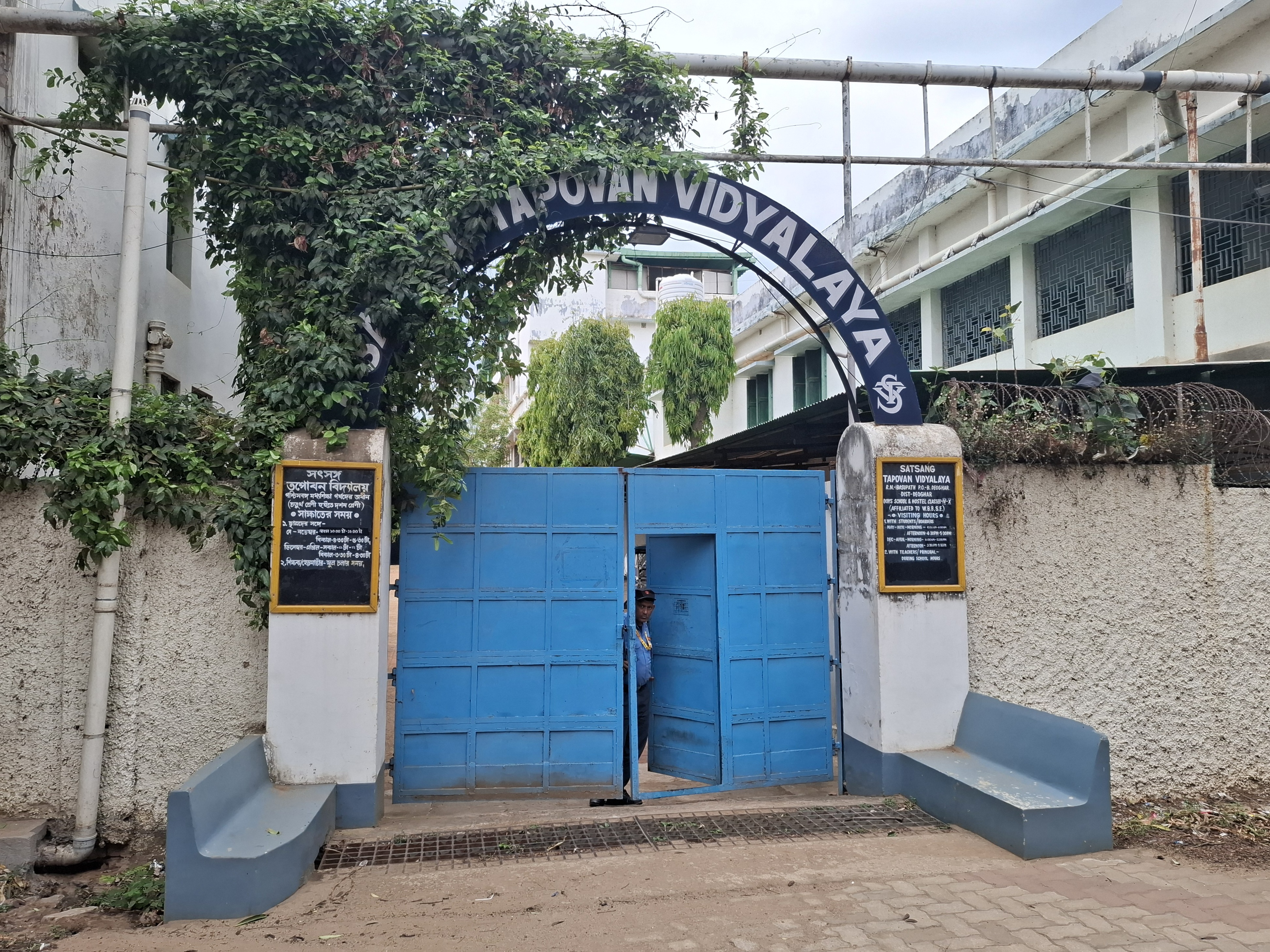
Tapovan Vidyalaya run by Satsang

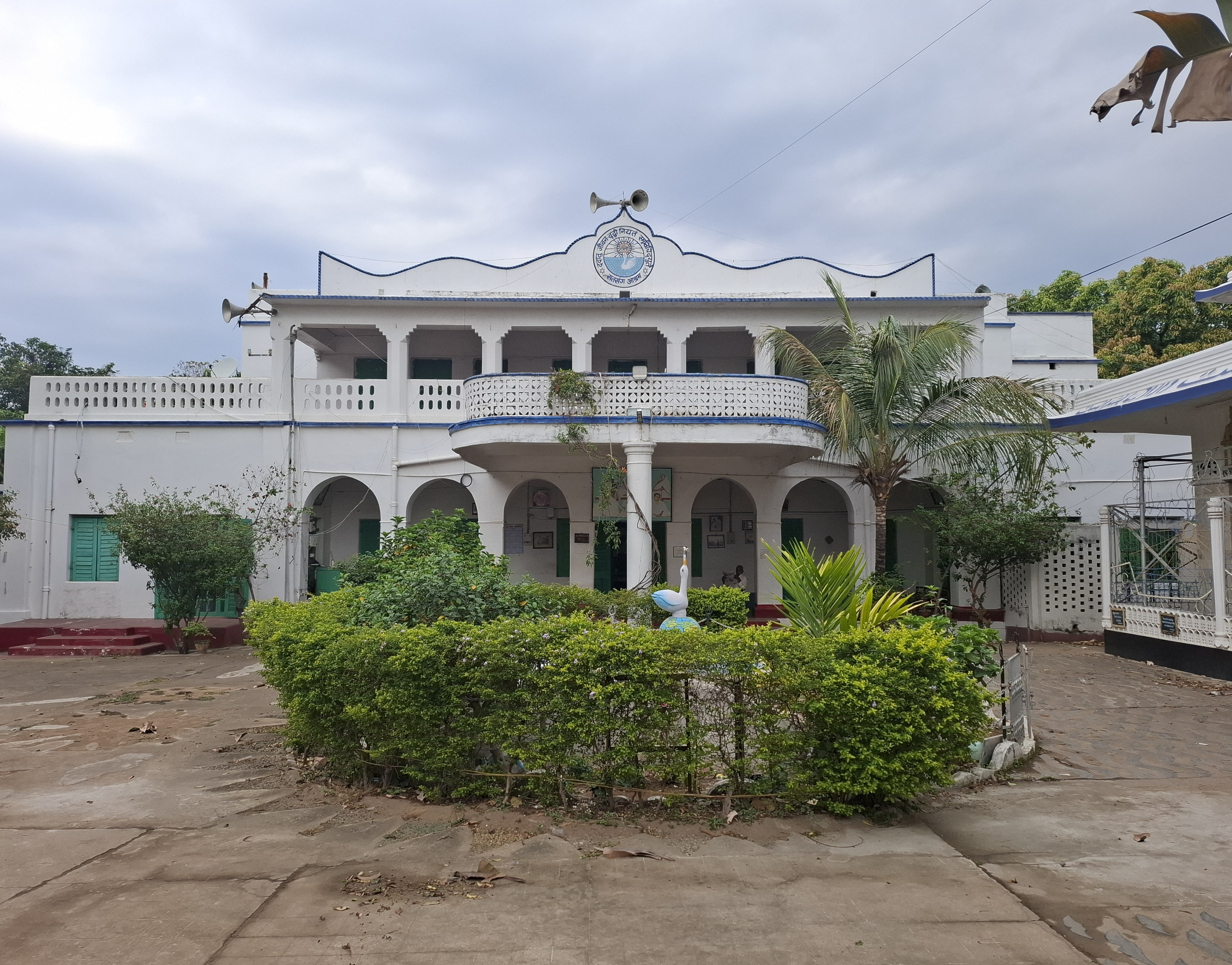
Pracheta Manjil, house of Prachetaranjan Chakrabarty under Satsang Ashram
