= Anukulchandra Chakravarty =

Indian physician, philosopher, spiritual leader (1888–1969)

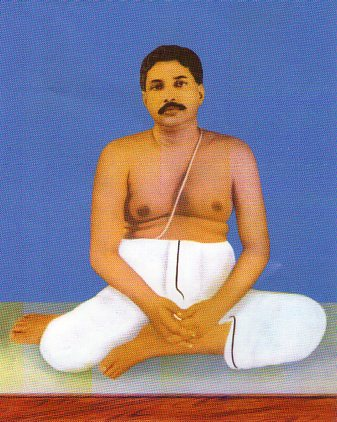
- Sri Sri Thakur Anukulchandra

Personal life
- Born: Anukul Chandra Chakroborty; 14 September 1888 Pabna District, British India
- Died: 27 January 1969 (aged 80) Deoghar, Bihar (now Jharkhand), India
- Spouse: Shoroshibala Devi; Sarbamangola Devi

Religious life
- Religion: Hindu
- Founder of: Satsang (Deoghar)
- Philosophy: Radha Soami

Senior posting
- Influenced by: Huzur Maharaj, Soami Ji Maharaj, Sarkar Sahab, Maharaj Sahab

Anukulchandra Chakravarty (14 September 1888 – 27 January 1969), popularly known as Sree Sree Thakur, was an Indian physician and spiritual guru in Radha Soami Sant Mat and the founder of Satsang, in Deoghar, Jharkhand. He was born in a Brahmin family.

In 1913, Anukulchandra was spiritually initiated by his mother, under the guidance of Param Guru Sarkar Sahib (Fourth Sant Satguru of Radhasoami Satsang Dayalbagh Agra)(through a letter). After his initiation, he along with his friends and companions started doing intense kirtan. During kirtan, he often went into a state of trance, fell on the ground unconsciously and uttered messages in that condition. His going into trance during kirtan, delivering holy messages during trance and the devotion of those around him started attracting many more people. As a number of people came to his village to visit him began to settle permanently, gradually his village home was converted into an ashram.

== Early life and service ==
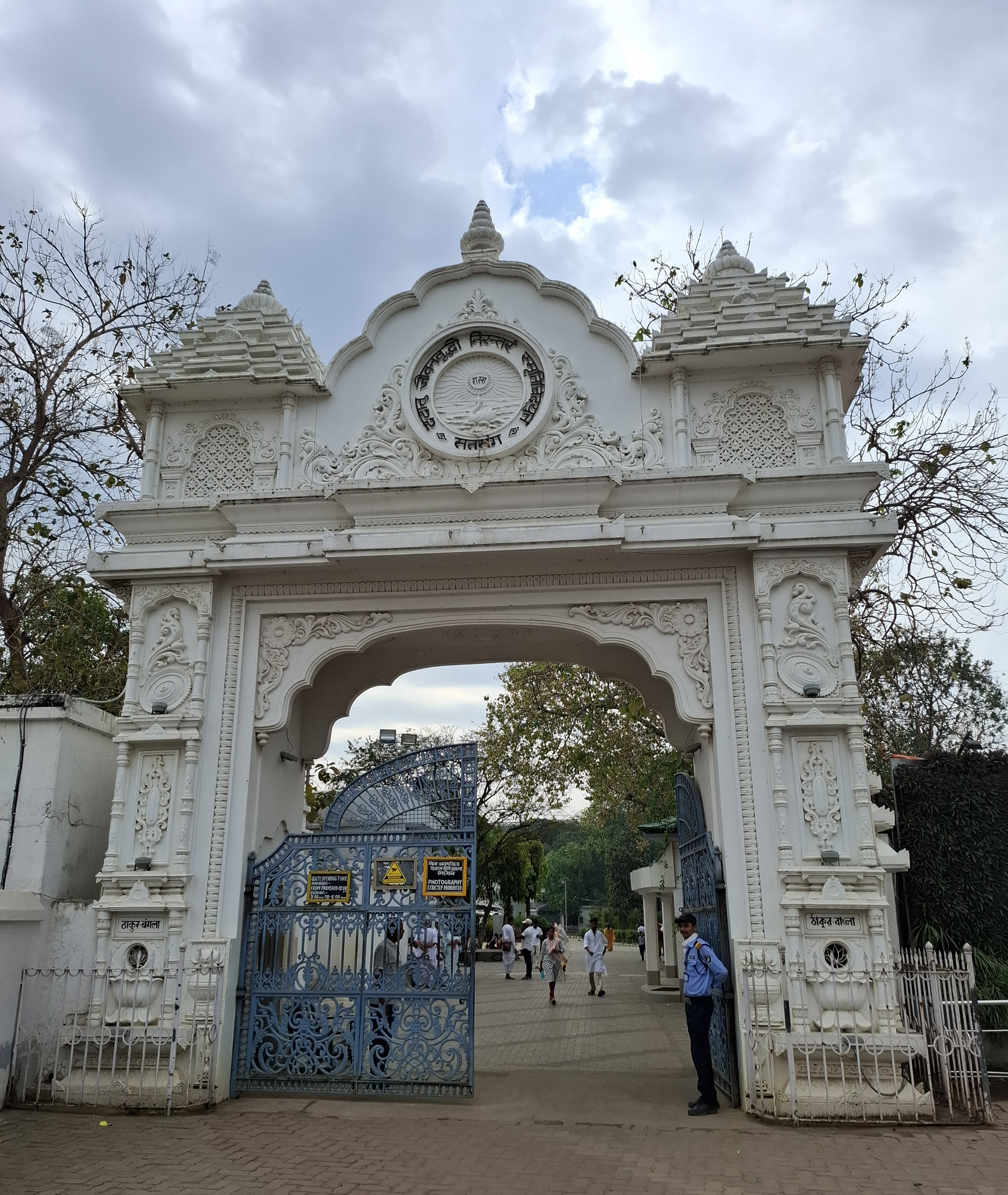
Satsang Ashram headquarters founded by Anukulchandra

Anukulchandra Chakroborty was born on 14th September, 1888 in the Himaitpur village of Pabna district of East Bengal, British India which is now a part of Bangladesh. Sivachandra Chakroborty and Monomohini Devi were his father and mother respectively. As a young medical student in Calcutta, Anukulchandra started serving and treating the slum dwellers in 1911. After six years of study, he came back to Himaitpur and began to practice medicine. His devotees address him as Yuga Purushottam or the Prophet of the modern age. On the other hand he is the founder of Satsang at Deoghar in Bihar now Jharkhand.

In August 1909 Anukulachandra married Saroshibala Devi. On November 17, 1930, he married Sarbamangala who was the younger sister of Anukulachandra's first wife.

== Death ==
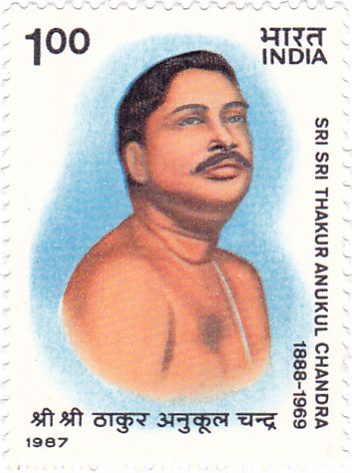
Indian stamp on Sree Sree Thakur's Centenary

Anukulchandra died on 27 January 1969. The Government of India released a commemorative postage stamp, in 1987.
