= Satsang (Deoghar) =

Philanthropic organisation

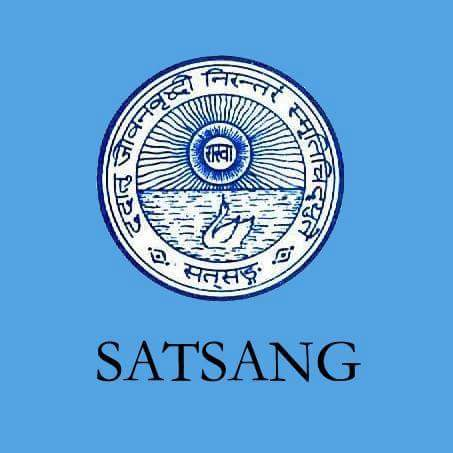
- Logo of Satsang
- Formation: 4 April 1951; 75 years ago Deoghar, India
- Founder: Sree Sree Thakur Anukulchandra
- Type: Religious organisation
- Purpose: service to mankind
- Headquarters: Satsang Ashram, Jharkhand, India
- Coordinates: 22.37°N 88.21°E
- Region served: Worldwide
- Website: www.satsang.org.in

Satsang is a philanthropic organization founded by Sree Sree Thakur Anukulchandra. It is one of the major spiritual and cultural movements inspired by Radha Soami Sant Mat , tradition in India started in the early 20th century. Satsang was originally registered in Pabna (British India) in 1925 as a public charitable institution. However, after the Independence and partition of India, it was again registered in 1951 in the Indian Union under the Societies Registration act of 1960.

Its headquarters was established as Satsang Ashram at Deoghar, Jharkhand (then Bihar) after Thakur Anukulchandra moved to Deoghar from his birthplace in the Pabna District of East Bengal (now Bangladesh) on 2 September 1946. At present Satsang has more than two thousand branches located in India, Bangladesh, Burma, Europe, Middle East, Africa and America.

== The founder ==
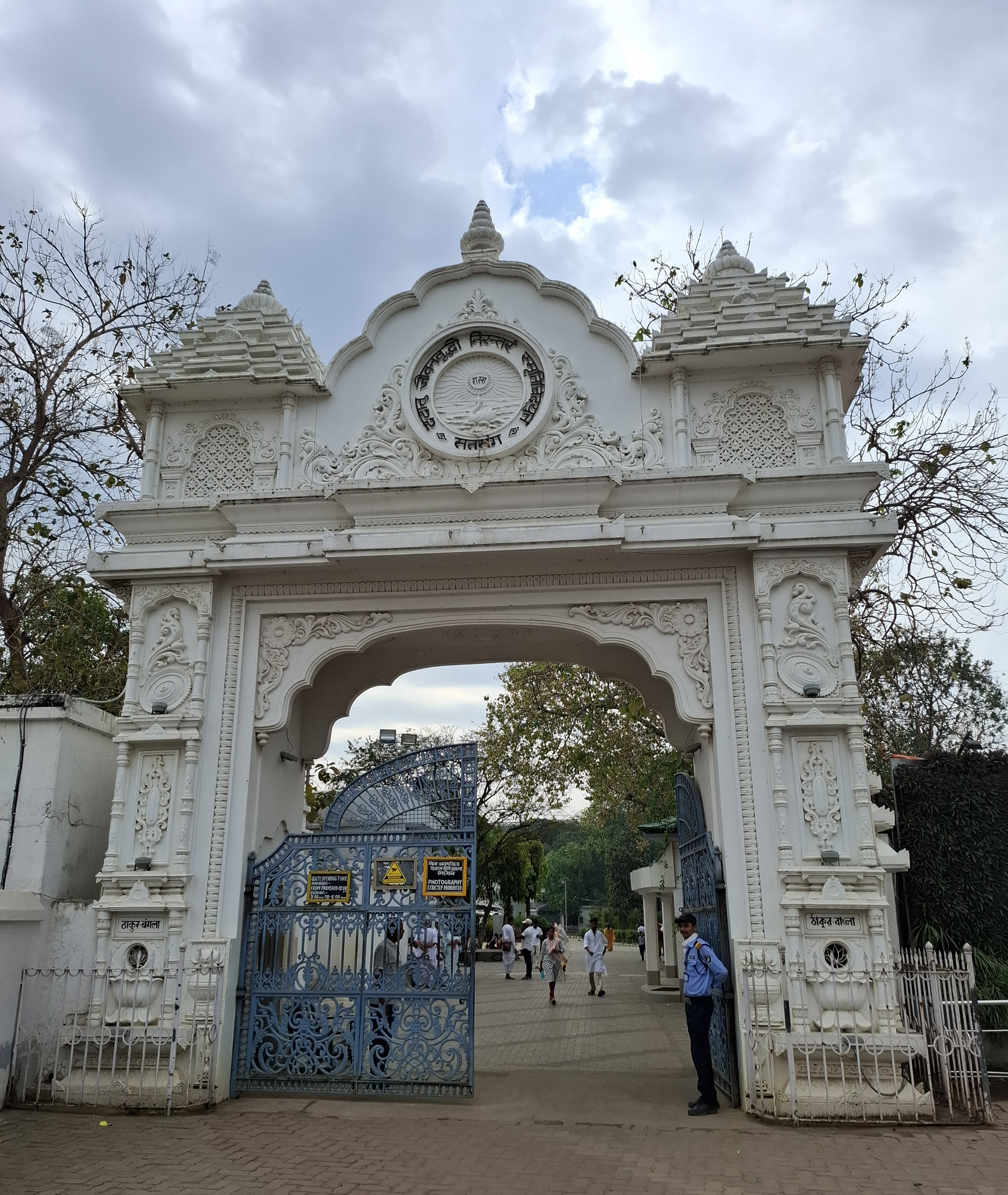
Satsang Headquarter in Deoghar

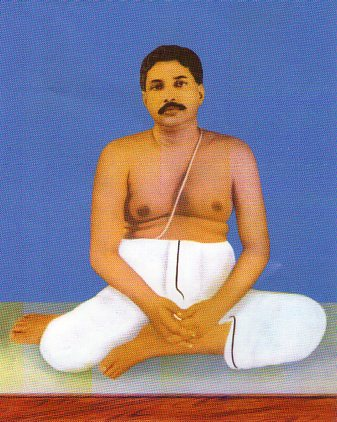
Sri Sri Thakur Anukulchandra.

Anukulchandra Chakravarty (1888–1969) a physician, a philosopher, a guru and the founder of Satsang, was born in the Himaitpur village of Pabna district of British India which is now a part of Bangladesh. Sivachandra Chakravarty and Monomohini Devi (A follower of Huzur Maharaj, Radhasoami Satsang of Dayalbagh Agra) were his father and mother respectively. As a young medical student in Calcutta, Anukulchandra started serving and treating the slum dwellers in 1911. After six years of study, he came back to Himaitpur and began to practice medicine.

In 1913, Anukulchandra was spiritually initiated by his mother, under the guidance of Param Guru Sarkar Sahib (Fourth Sant Satguru of Radhasoami Satsang Dayalbagh Agra)(through a letter). After his initiation, he along with his friends and companions started doing intense kirtan. During kirtan, he often went into a state of trance, fell on the ground unconsciously and uttered messages in that condition. His going into trance during kirtan, delivering holy messages during trance and the devotion of those around him started attracting many more people. As a number of people came to his village to visit him began to settle permanently, gradually his village home was converted into an ashram.

Anukulchandra Chakravarty's service to the people as a doctor, his speaking in tongues in a state of trance as well as his advice and guidance to his followers helped him secure a position as a religious leader. The personality, life and teachings of Thakur Anukulchandra mediates between science and spirituality, personal affirmation and self-transformation, individualism and social commitment has put him in the class of prophets or avatars of the Indian religious tradition. His devotees address him as Yuga Purushottam or the Prophet of the modern age.

== The motto and the principles ==
Satsang was established solely on the principles and ideals of Thakur Anukulchandra. It is a non-sectarian organization as revealed by the Guru himself in his hand written book Satyanusaran originally in Bengali and later translated in to many languages including English as 'The pursuit of Truth'. In this book, he writes, "Oh Mankind! If you desire to invoke your good, forget sectarian conflict. Be regardful to the past prophets. Be attached to your living Master or God and take only those who love Him as your own. Because all the past Prophets are consummated in the divine man of the present". He again writes, "Dharma never becomes many. It is always one. There is no variety of it. Views may be many- even as many as there are people. In my opinion, to speak of Hindu Dharma, Christian Dharma, Mohammedan Dharma, Buddhist Dharma etc. is wrong; rather they are so many views".

As a result, people from all faiths including Hindus, Sikhs, Christians and Muslims came to Thakur Anukulchandra and accepted him as their realized guide, Guru and living ideal, without diluting their identities. He always preached and guided people of different faiths who came to him to become a true Muslim, true Christian or a true Hindu according to their own faiths and practices. Satsang at present is one of the fastest growing spiritual lineage in the world with more than 160 million members across the globe. It accepts members from all walks of life without discrimination and distinction. The members of Satsang are called Satsangees.

In one of his verses, Thakur Anukulchandra puts forward the motto and ideals of Satsang in its entirety as below:

Satsang wants man
in the name of the One Supreme Creator
of all beings,
God, Khoda or Existence,
Whatever you call Him.
Satsang does not think in terms of
Hindu, Christian, Muslim, Buddhist;
regarding each and everyone
as a child of Him alone,
Satsang wants to make all
submissive to that One.

Satsang does not think in terms of
Pakistan, Hindustan, Russia, China, Europe or America either-
Satsang wants man, every individual of mankind—
whether Hindu, Muslim, Christian or Buddhist or whatever—
to be gathered in His Name
at the clarion call of Panchabarhi*
in pursuit, nurture and fulfilment,
in elevating offering,
in mutual compassionate co-operation
and in an uplifting, efficient and industrious go of life
so that everybody by proper work
earning their food and clothing can survive,
maintaining distinctiveness of being
and moving in the way of becoming,
so that everyone can understand
that everyone belongs to him,
so that no one can think
that he is helpless, penniless, shelter less,
so that every single person can say courageously
with active co-operative zeal of love
"I am everyone's
and everyone is mine".

Satsang wants the greatest co-operation
between states
so that there is not the least flaw
in anyone's existential becoming
and so that each and everyone
can move on freely
in this world
in one accord
with self-elevating, efficient and active,
progressive go of service,
growing in integration
that is mutually fulfilling—
being illuminated with the inspiration
that cultivates the good,
with an eye to fulfilling that Ideal man
being meaningful in that unparalleled One.
-Sree Sree Thakur Anukulchnadra (Dhriti Bidhayana, Vol-I, p394)

== Branches and centers ==
The headquarters of Satsang, known as Satsang Ashram is located in the city of Deoghar, Jharkhand, India. The establishment of the Ashram was started in 1946 after Thakur Anukulchandra moved to Deoghar. All the major activities of the organization are administered by the Ashram administrators.

Apart from the Satsang Ashram, there are more than two thousand branches of Satsang located not only in India but also Bangladesh, Burma, Europe, Middle East, Africa and America. These branches are known as Satsang Vihars and Satsang Kendras. At most of the Satsang Vihar premises, temples have been built dedicated to the Sree Sree Thakur Anukulchandra. All the spiritual, charitable, and social activities are carried out at these centers on a local scale. In India, Satsang Vihars have been set up in almost all the states and major cities.

== Activities ==
The principal workers of the organization are the disciples and followers of Thakur Anukulchandra. The activities of Satsang covers the following areas:

- Philanthropy
- Education
- Health care
- Cultural activities
- Industrial and engineering activities etc.

Satsang has its own administrative office, free community kitchen (Anandabazar), charitable hospital, school, college, publishing house, pharmaceutical laboratory, engineering and mechanical workshop, carpentry unit, garage, Goshala (cowshed) and museums etc. Most of the related institutions are established in the premises of Satsang Ashram, the headquarters of the organization. The Ashramites work at these centers for the purpose of service to their Guru.

=== Religious and spiritual activities ===
A number of functions are celebrated by Satsang throughout the year. The birth anniversaries of Thakur Anukulchandra, his wife (Sree Sree Boromaa), his eldest son (Sree Sree Borda) and the current Acharyadev (Arkadyuti Chakravarty) are being celebrated in the Satsang Ashram. Other festivals related to the life events of Thakur Anukulchandra, Ritwik conferences are also being celebrated. Lacs of devotees from around the country and abroad arrive at the Ashram to attend the celebrations. Eminent personalities usually attend various Utsavs and functions at the Satsang Ashram.

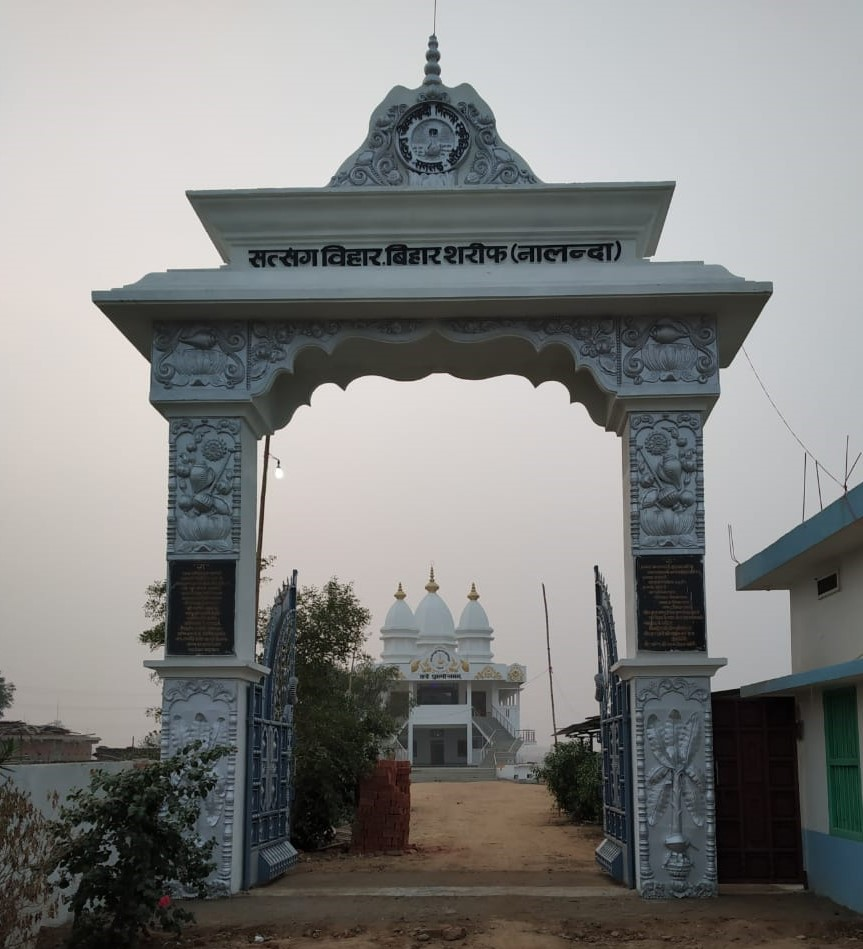
Satsang Vihar Bihar Sharif, Nalanda

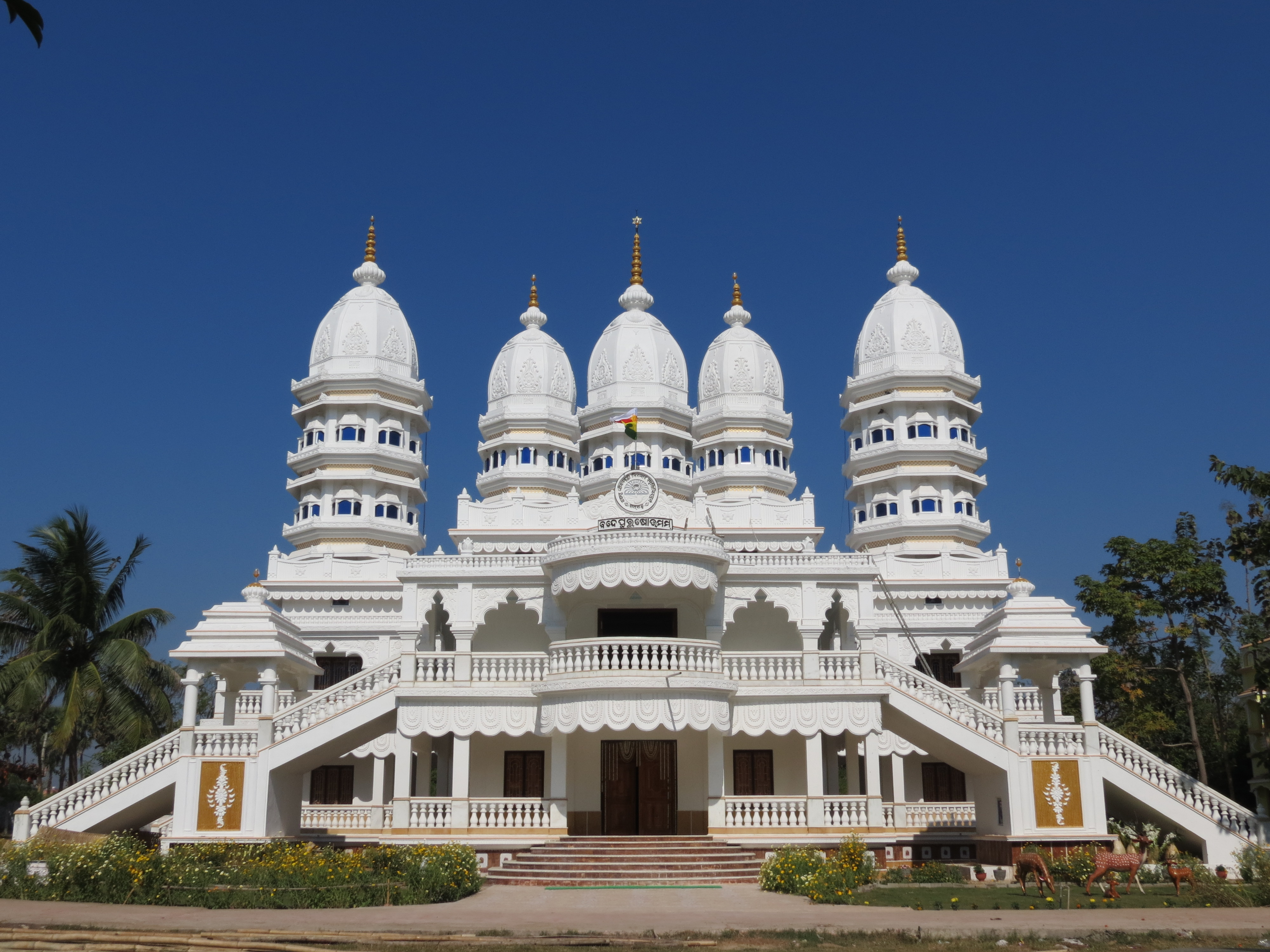
Satsang Vihar Anandapur, Odisha

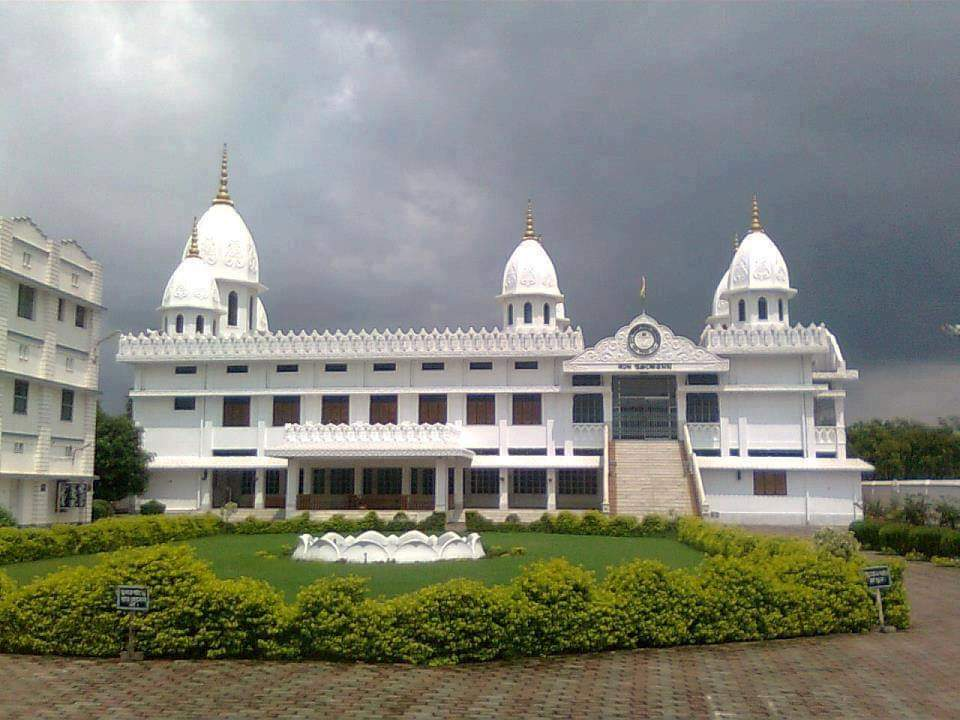
Satsang Vihar Sonamukhi, Bankura, West Bengal

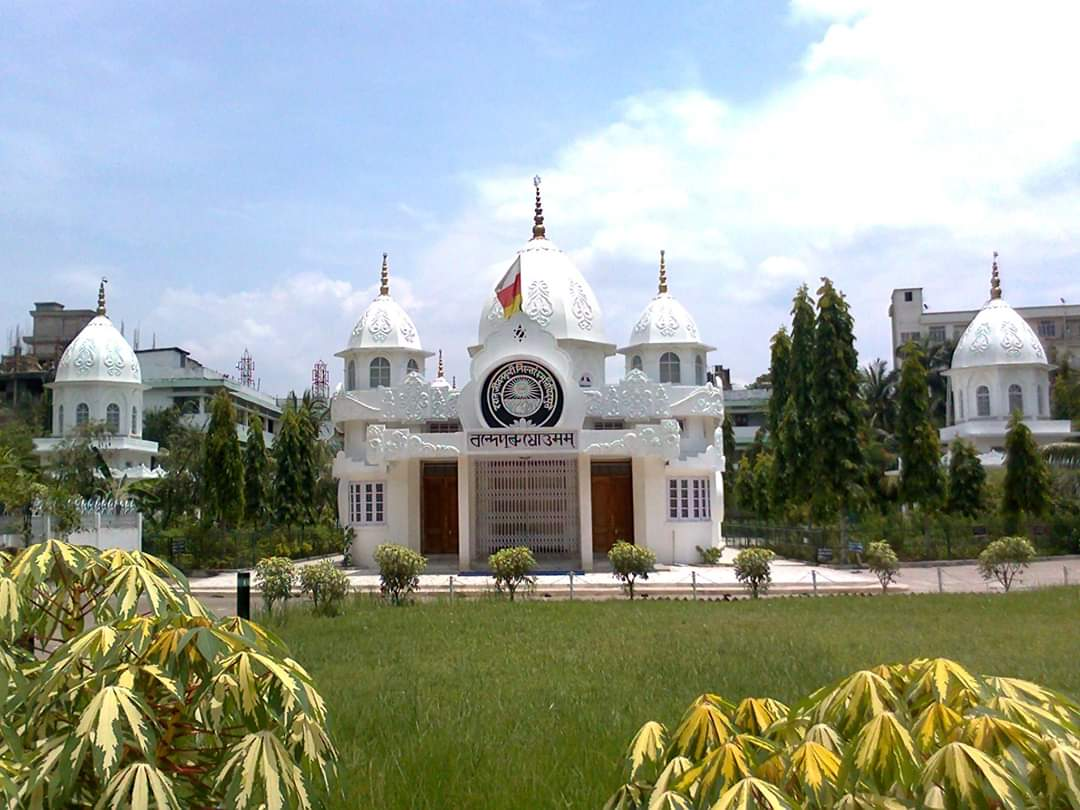
Satsang Vihar Guwahati, Assam

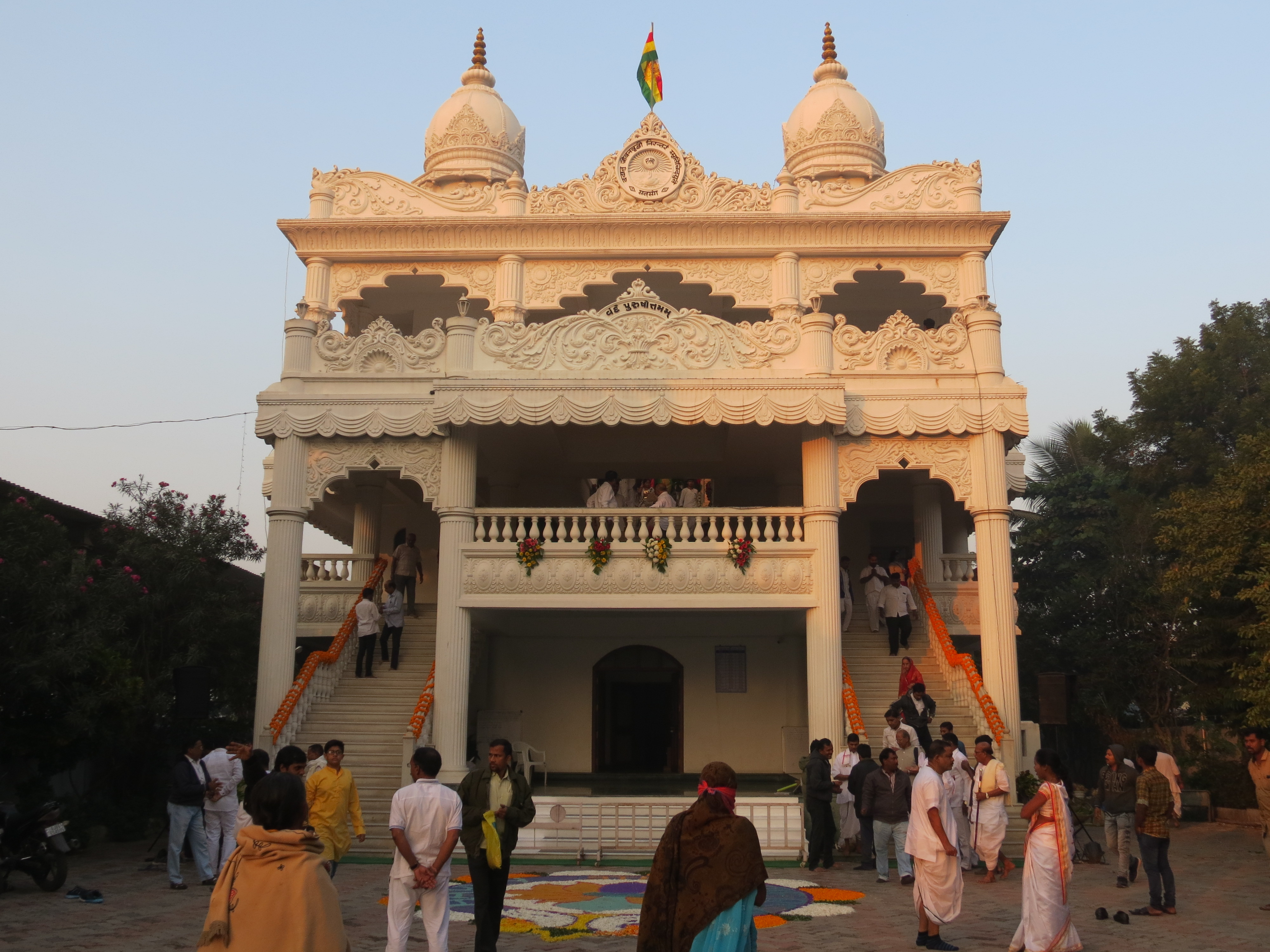
Satsang Vihar Surat, Gujarat
