= Radhasoami Satsang Dayalbagh =

Indian spiritual tradition

- Official logo of the Radha Soami Satsang Dayalbagh

Religions
- Radha Soami or Sant Mat (Non-denominational)

Website
- https://www.dayalbagh.org.in/

Radhasoami Satsang Dayalbagh also known as Ra Dha Sva Aa Mi Satsang Dayalbagh is century old spiritual tradition and the main sect of Radhasoami Mat with its Headquarter in Agra (Birth Place of Radhasoami Sant Mat) located on the banks of Yamuna River. Radhasoami Satsang was founded by the first sant satguru, Param Purush Puran Dhani Soami Ji Mahraj on Basant Panchami Day in 1861 in Agra.

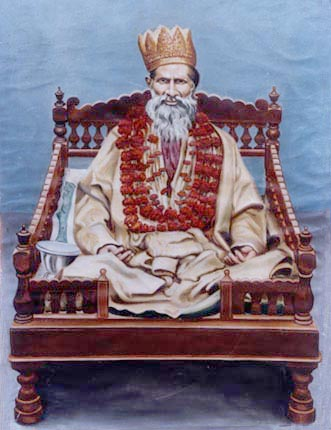
Param Purush Puran Dhani Soami Ji Maharaj, Established Satsang on Basant Panchami,1861

The permanent satsang headquarter " Dayalbagh" were established on Basant Panchami Day in 1915 by Fifth Sant Satguru Param Guru Sahab Ji Maharaj. Radhasoami Satsang Sabha is its the Chief Working Committee since 1910. The Guru lineage of the Soami Ji Maharaj is continue till date in Agra. Param Guru Huzur Satsangi Sahab is present sant satguru of the Satsang.

== Sant Satguru ==
The Lineage of Radhasoami Satsang Dayalbagh -

- Param Guru Soami Ji Maharaj (1818–1878) First Sant Satguru, 1861–1878
- Param Guru Huzur Maharaj (1829–1898) Second Sant Satguru, 1878–1898
- Param Guru Maharaj Sahab (1861–1907) Third Sant Satguru, 1898–1907
- Param Guru Sarkar Sahab (1871–1913) Fourth Sant Satguru, 1907–1913
- Param Guru Sahab Ji Maharaj (1881–1937) Fifth Sant Satguru, 1913–1937
- Param Guru Mehta Ji Maharaj (1885–1975)Sixth Sant Satguru, 1937–1975
- Param Guru Lal Sahab (1907–2002) Seventh Sant Satguru, 1975–2002
- Param Guru Satsangi Sahab (1937–Present)Eighth and Present Vaqt Sant Satguru, 2002–Present
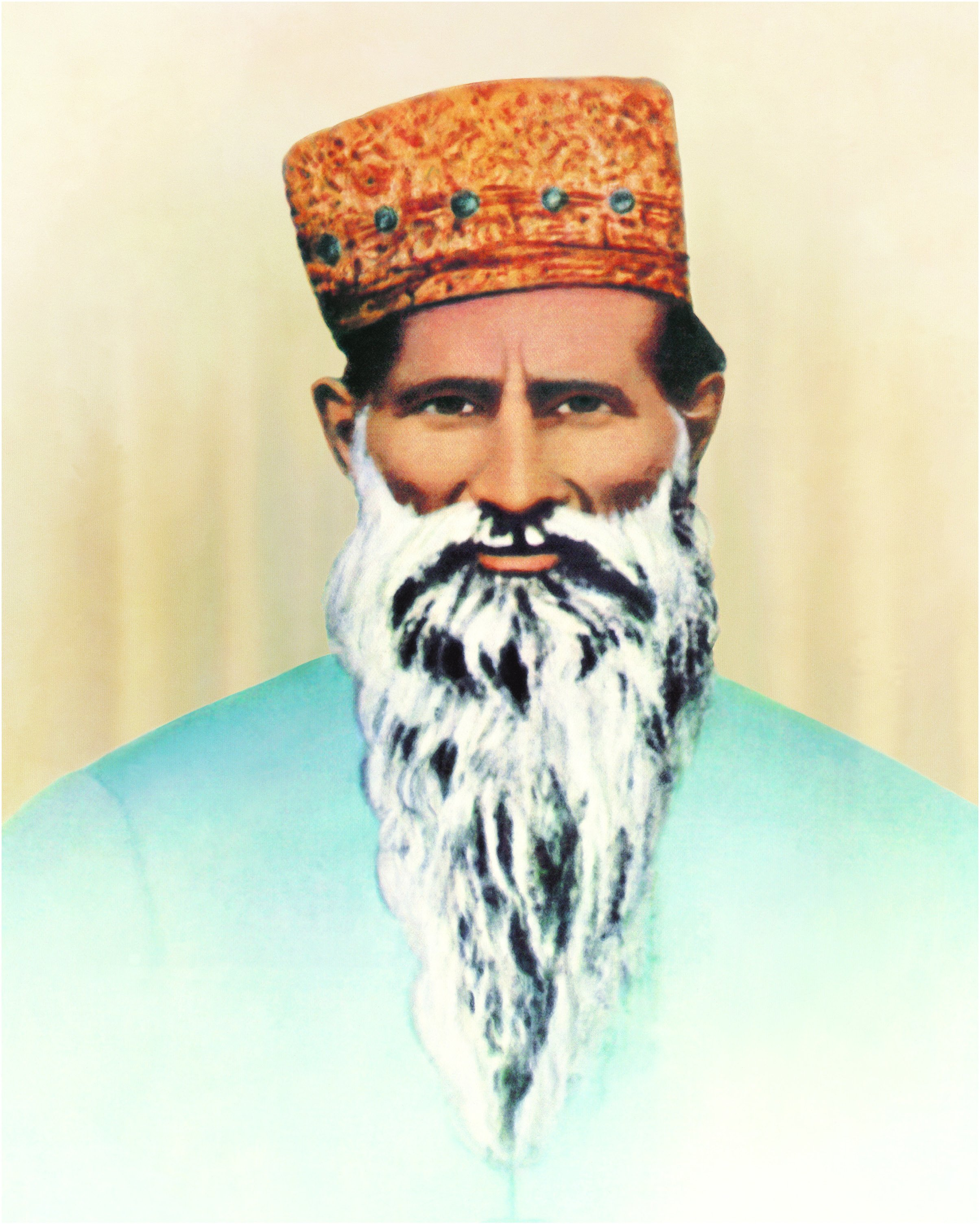
Param Guru Soami Ji Maharaj, considered as the founder of the Radhasoami movement and was the first spiritual Master of Radhasoami Satsang Dayalbagh.

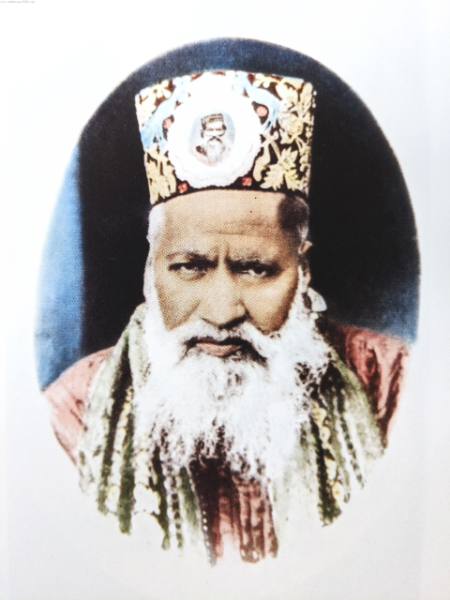
Param Guru Huzur Maharaj, next spiritual head of Radha Soami Satsang Dayalbagh. He remained in office from 1878 to 1898.

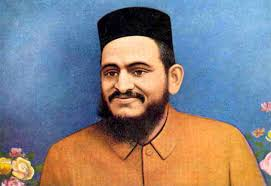
Param Guru Maharaj Sahab, the follower of Huzur Maharaj, succeeded him and became the spiritual head of Radha Soami Satsang Dayalbagh. He remained in office from 1898 to 1907.

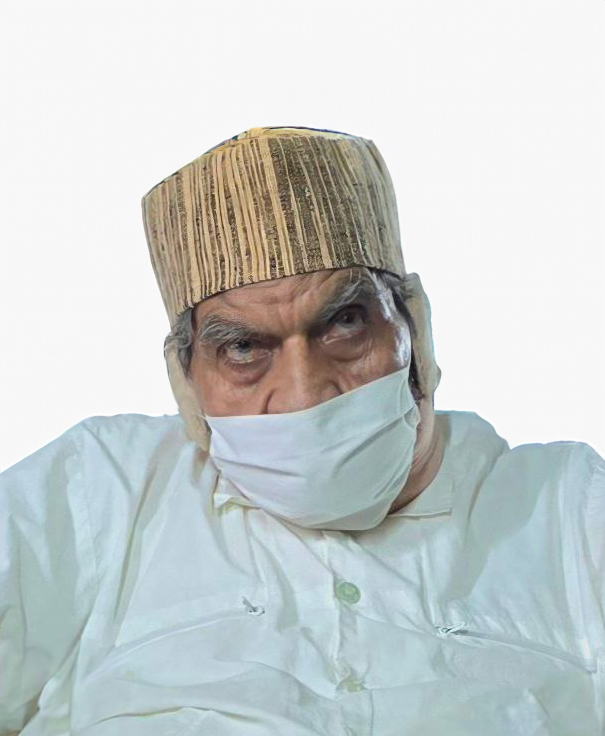
Param Guru Prof. Prem Saran Satsangi Sahab (Graceous Huzur), the successor of Huzur Lal Sahab, succeeded him as the spiritual head of Radha Soami Satsang Dayalbagh. He is functioning as Sant Satguru since 2002

== Chronology ==
- 1818: Incarnation of Radhasoami Dayal in Human form of Soami Ji Maharaj
- 1861: Radhasoami Satsang founded by Soami Ji Maharaj on Basant Panchami Day. Satsang became open to all. Satsang continued to be held at Panni Gali and Radhasoamibagh in Agra.
- 1878: Departure of Soami Ji Maharaj. Huzur Maharaj became the second sant-satguru. Satsang continued to be held at Huzur Bhavan, Pipal Mandi in Agra.
- 1898: Departure of Huzur Maharaj. Maharaj Sahab became the third sant-satguru. Satsang continued to be held in Allahabad (now Prayagraj) and Varanasi.
- 1902: Maharaj Sahab established the Central Administrative Council.
- 1907: Departure of Maharaj Sahab. Sarkar Sahab became the fourth sant-satguru. Satsang continued to be held in Gazipur, Uttar Pradesh.
- 1910: The Chief Working Committee of Satsang was founded and named Radhasoami Satsang Sabha .
- 1913: Departure of Sarkar Sahab. Sahab Ji Maharaj became the fifth sant-satguru.
- 1915: Dayalbagh was established as the permanent headquarters of the Satsang community on Basant Panchami Day. Radhasoami Satsang became popularly known as Radhasoami Satsang Dayalbagh.

== Satsang & It's Charitable Institutions ==
- Radhasoami Satsang Sabha (Central Administrative Authority)
- Saran Ashram Hospital (charitable hospital)
- Dayalbagh Educational Institute (University)
- Dayalbagh Science of Consciousness
- International Center for Agroecology(ICA)
- SPHEEHA
- Systems Society of India
- International Centre for Applied Systems Science for Sustainable Development
- The (Dayalbagh) Ra Dha Sva Aa Mi Satsang Association of Europe
- DAYALBAGH RADHASOAMI SATSANG ASSOCIATION OF AUSTRALASIA
- Dayalbagh Radhasoami Satsang Association of North America
