= Caroline Massin =

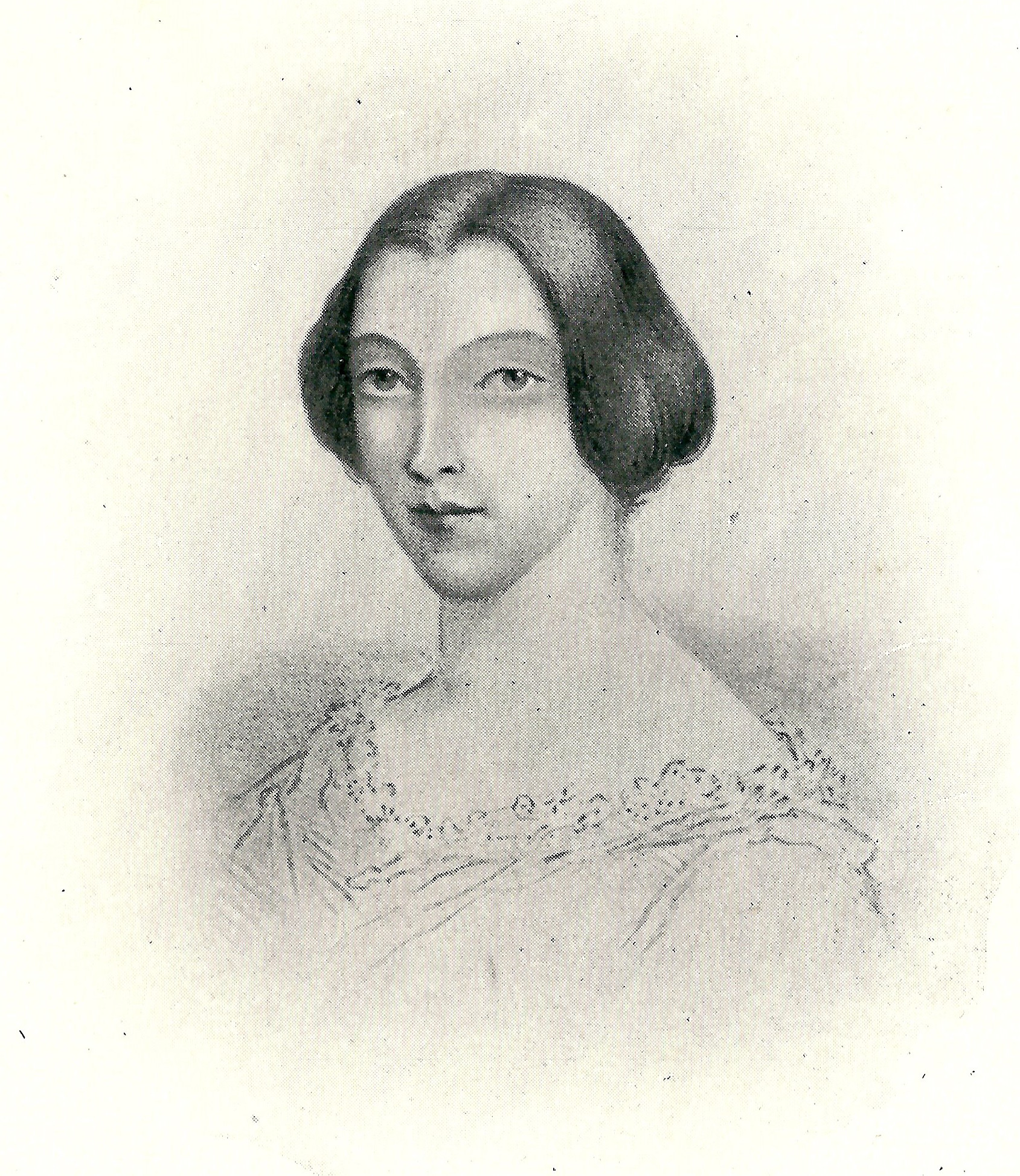
- Massin as a young woman
- Born: 2 July 1802; Châtillon-sur-Seine, Côte-d'Or, France
- Died: 27 January 1877 (aged 74); Paris, France
- Occupation: Bookseller

Caroline Massin (2 July 1802 – 27 January 1877) was a French seamstress known for her tempestuous marriage with the philosopher Auguste Comte during the most creative period of his life. Comte was mentally unstable and had jealous fantasies about his wife's infidelities. Early in the marriage he broke down and was confined to an asylum for several months. The marriage continued to be strained, with constant money worries. Although Caroline supported her husband and believed in his genius, Comte could never accept her independence. They separated after 17 years. In his last years Comte wrote an appendix to his will in which he accused Caroline of having been a prostitute. The slur was later repeated by his followers. After his death Caroline encouraged a sympathetic biographer of Comte and helped launch a magazine devoted to his philosophy of positivism.

== Early years ==
Caroline Massin was born in Châtillon-sur-Seine on 2 July 1802. Her parents were Louis Hilare Massin and Marie Anne Baudelot, provincial actors. They were not married and separated soon after she was born. She was raised in a warm and upright environment in Paris by her maternal grandmother, the wife of a tailor. In 1813 her grandfather died. Her grandmother could no longer support her and returned her to her mother. Her life in the next few years is obscure. She seems to have been given some education since her surviving letters show she wrote well. She may have worked as a laundress, seamstress or actress. She was running a bookshop or reading room in 1822 when Auguste Comte met her through a mutual friend, a young and liberal lawyer named Antoine Cerclet. (Note: As a young man Antoine Cerclet was associated with the professional revolutionary Philippe Buonarroti. Under the July Monarchy Cerclet would become a respectable senior public servant, Maître des requêtes at the Conseil d'État.)

Comte and Caroline Massin began meeting occasionally in public. In the autumn of 1823 Comte began giving Caroline mathematics lessons at her apartment, and they became intimate. Early in 1824 Caroline sold the reading room, planning to live for a time off the proceeds. In February 1824 she and Comte moved into an apartment just off the rue Saint-Honoré for which she supplied the furniture. They settled into a regular and happy routine, eating at home and retiring early. In letters written in 1824 Comte described Caroline as "very spiritual, very kind, and pretty." He loved "her good heart, her graces, her rare spirit, her kindness, her happy character and her good habits." His best friend Pierre Valat wrote that she had great charm and high intelligence, and was passionately loved by Comte. They decided to marry, and Comte wrote to ask his parents for their approval. The marriage took place on 19 February 1825. Caroline's mother attended and gave her consent. Both she and Caroline gave their occupations as washerwomen. There were four witnesses, including Antoine Cerclet.

== Married life ==
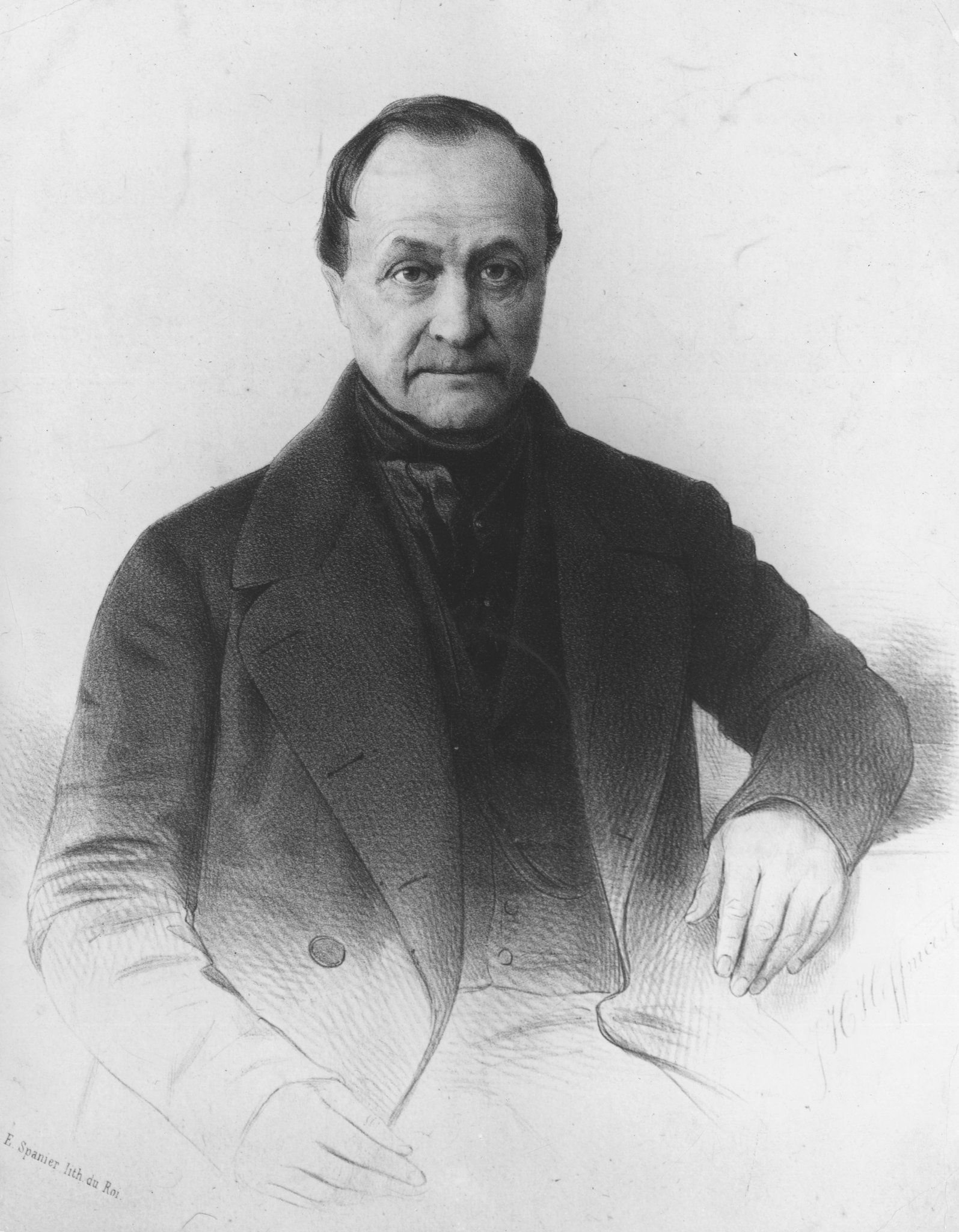
Auguste Comte

The marriage was unhappy, often violent, stressed by lack of money and with several separations, but it was during the marriage that Comte wrote his masterwork, the six volume Cours de Philosophie Positive (Course in Positive Philosophy). The couple had little money and Comte could not find work he liked, but at the end of July they managed to make a visit to Comte's parents in Montpellier. Caroline and Comte's parents did not get on. Comte suspected that Caroline was being unfaithful, possibly with Cerclet and others. They separated in March 1826, and soon after Comte had a mental breakdown.

Comte took refuge in a hotel in Saint Denis, from where he wrote to Caroline, then disappeared. She guessed that he had gone to Montmorency, one of his favorite places, and found him there trying to set fire to his room. With the help of a local doctor she calmed him down. She returned to Paris to get help from Cerclet, and he was able to find a place at the asylum run by the psychiatrist Jean-Étienne Dominique Esquirol. Cerclet, Caroline and Comte's friend the celebrated biologist Henri Blainville managed to move Comte there through a ruse. Louis Massin, Caroline's father, had appeared just before Comte's breakdown to ask her for money. She refused, and in revenge he slandered her to Comte's very respectable parents, telling them her infidelities had driven their son mad.

Comte's mother Rosalie came to Paris to help her son. The family tried to obtain an "interdiction", which would remove Comte's legal rights and place him under the care of his father. They appeared before a judge on 2 June 1826 and declared to the judge that they were the only people in Paris close to Comte, making no mention of his wife but saying he had a mistress whose depravity was the cause of his madness. The interdiction was granted. When Caroline heard of this she asked Blainville for help and he arranged to have the interdiction cancelled. Rosalie Comte stayed in Paris for six months, spending much time with Caroline, and began to feel her daughter-in-law had been maligned. She checked the register of prostitutes and found no trace of her name. She showed Caroline the letter her father Louis Massin had written, and Caroline was profoundly shocked.

On 2 December Esquirol declared that he could not cure Comte, and returned him to Caroline. He was forced to submit to a Catholic wedding that Rosalie had arranged. At first Comte was violent and unpredictable, but Caroline began to nurse him back to sanity. He was still unstable and depressive. In March 1827 Comte tried to kill himself by jumping into the Seine from a bridge, but was prevented by a passing royal guard. After his second attempt at suicide he decided he had been saved so he could undertake his life's work, the description of a positivist philosophy. Caroline supported him throughout this time. She acted as Comte's full-time secretary while he was writing his book.

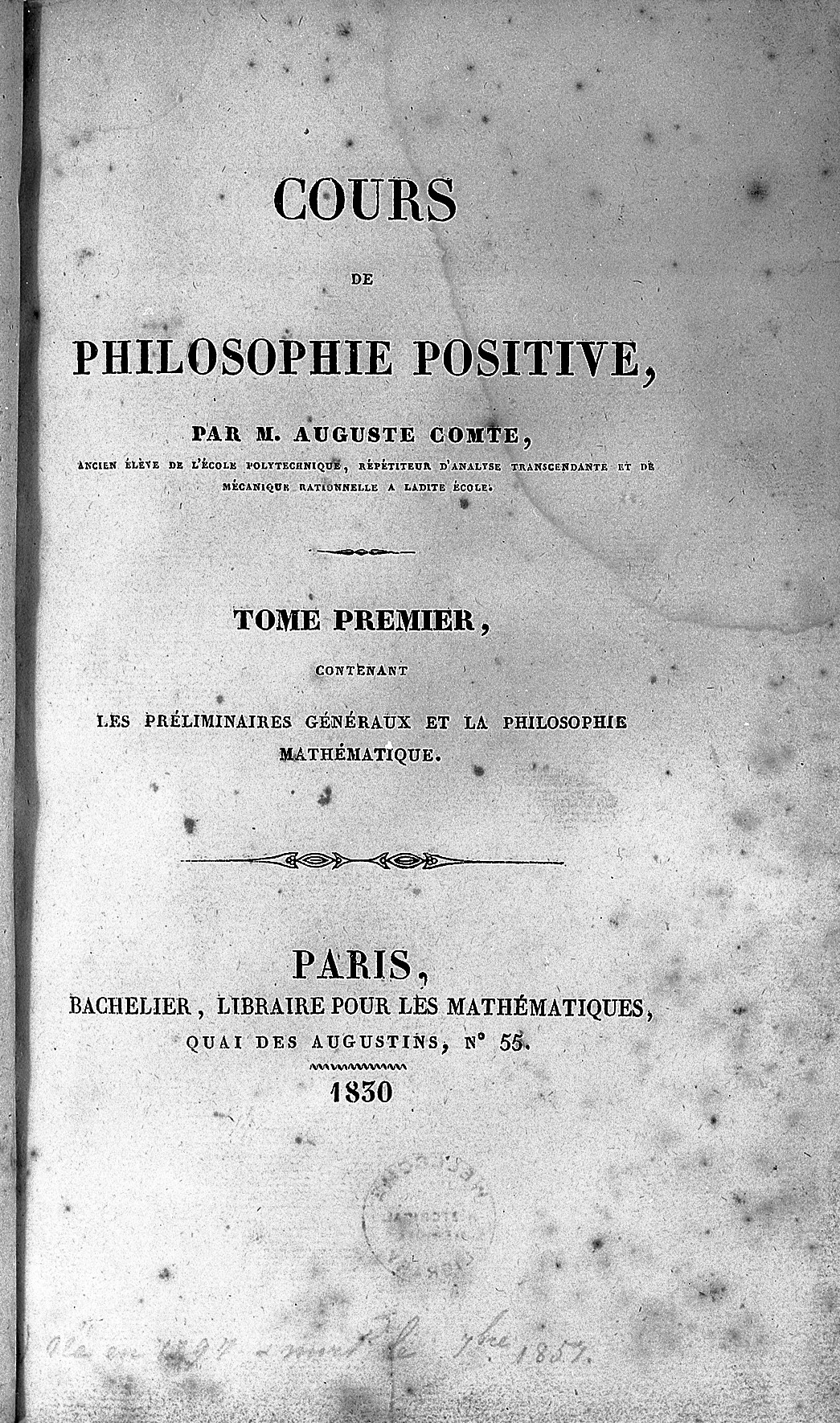
The first volume of the Cours de philosophie positive, published in 1830

Caroline fell ill with smallpox in late 1832. Comte was not helpful during her convalescence, and they lived apart from the middle of March to the end of August 1833. Caroline's mother died on 29 August 1833 and she suffered a strong emotional crisis. Comte did what he could to help her through this period. The marriage continued to be strained by lack of money, particularly in 1834. The letters exchanged between Caroline and Comte during the times they were apart show mutual affection, but also show tension. Caroline and Comte separated for a third time on 3 May 1838. She was given a financial settlement and moved to a new apartment. The break did not last, and she returned later that month.

Comte was unable to get a full-time teaching appointment, and survived through low-paid jobs like teaching mathematics at a private school and being an external examiner at the École Polytechnique. In December 1839 Caroline told Blainville she thought Comte was on the verge of another attack like that of 1826. For the last year he had treated her with coarse reproaches, harsh words and violence out of all proportion to her offenses. She did not know what to do, and feared that if he went mad again he would be lost forever.

== Final separation ==
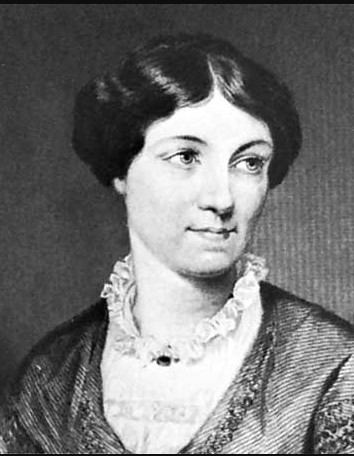
Caroline Massin later in life

At yet another crisis in the relationship, Caroline found an apartment for herself in the 9th arrondissement and moved there on 5 August 1842. This time the separation proved final. She left Comte just after the completion of his Cours de philosophie positive. Caroline recognized that the problems with the marriage were due to her insistence on equality. She wrote,

I have always been devoted to you, but I was not at all submissive. If there had been less real devotion and more submission, things would have been better between us. Many times you were basically right, but you asked me to yield in the name of your authority, and I stood up to you when I should have submitted. Really, I did not know how to be submissive, but even so, I did love you. You know that very well.... My great crime was to see in you a husband, not a master. I know very well that you are superior to me in many respects, and besides, this comparison has always seemed to me . . . most absurd. We did not do the same things.

Comte wrote to John Stuart Mill on 24 August 1842 to pour out his troubles,

Our personal friendship (...) causes me not to wait any longer to give you an important piece of personal news. A fundamental change, more favorable than unfavorable, has occurred in my household since my last letter. Madame Comte has left me voluntarily and probably irrevocably. For seventeen years I have been married, as a result of an unfortunate love to a woman of rare moral and intellectual qualities, but brought up under blameworthy principles and with a false notion of the essential function that her sex must play in the human economy. Her total lack of affection for me has never made it possible for me to overlook either her resistance to my authority or her despotic character. There have been none of the compensations of a loving disposition, the only special quality in which women are irreplaceable, and the power of which modern anarchy prevents them from appreciating as they should. Thus, my philosophical endeavors have been carried on and completed not only in the face of material difficulties, as you know, but also in the midst of more painful and absorbing disturbances, the result of an almost constant civil war of the most intimate kind, the confrontation in the home. The event which has just taken place makes me hope that from now on, even if I lack the happiness at home for which I was made but which I had to give up a long time ago, I shall at least have the sad peace of my loneliness that now completely envelops me.

== Later life ==
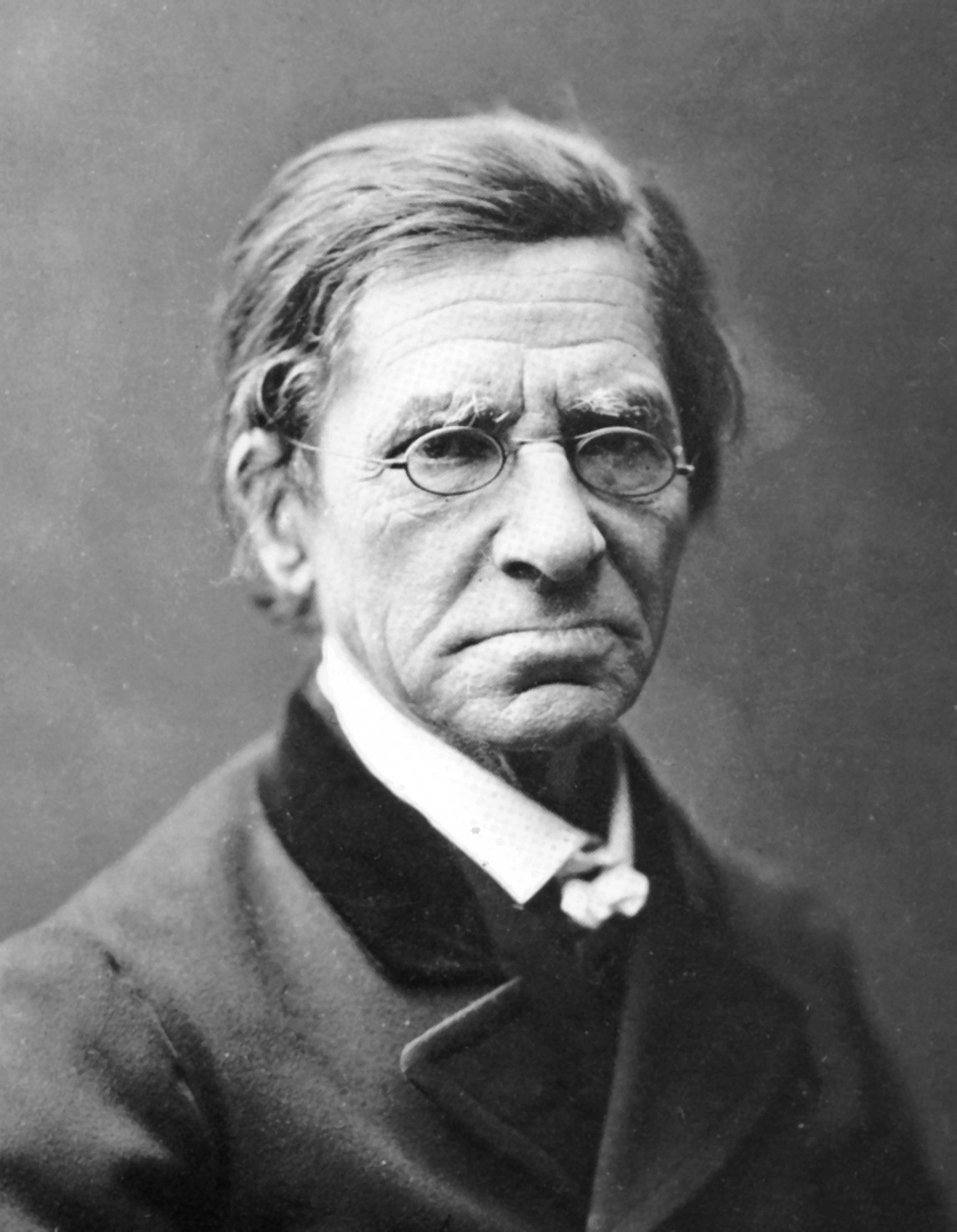
Émile Littré, who arranged support for Comte and whom Caroline encouraged to write a biography of her husband

Caroline Massin was intelligent and had some education. She was offered a job as a governess immediately after she finally separated from Comte. After Comte was dismissed from the École Polytechnique in 1844, his English collaborator John Stuart Mill gave him some immediate funds and arranged for three of his wealthy friends to provide him with a pension. Later his supporter Émile Littré arranged for a group of 73 of his French supporters to provide a stipend on which he could live comfortably. Some sources say that Caroline began an affair with Émile Littré. Certainly Comte broke with Littré due in part to jealousy of Littre's friendship with Caroline. After the break Comte began in visit his benefactors in person rather than have the funds delivered by Littré. He continued to give half his money to Caroline.

Caroline continued to correspond with Comte, and continued to help him. When the government refused to authorize him to continue teaching his course on the history of humanity in 1850, Caroline obtained an interview with Jean-Martial Bineau, the Minister of Public Works, and wrote follow-up letters that eventually resulted in renewal of the authorization. Due to the breakdown of their marriage, and because he had fallen in love with another woman, Clotilde de Vaux, Comte later tried to destroy her reputation. He wrote a "secret addition" to his will in which he insinuated that she was a prostitute. Comte blamed Caroline for causing his mental breakdown in 1826-27, which he claimed had cost him four years of lost productive time. He described her as meretricious, unworthy, heartless and ungrateful. (Note: According to Comte's "secret addition", Caroline's mother taught her that men were just "objects of exploitation", and sold her as a virgin to Antoine Cerclet. After Cerclet had left her and her grandmother had died, she was registered with the police as a prostitute. Comte visited her at her apartment on the rue Saint-Honoré for six months, when he could afford it, until Cerclet reappeared and this had to end. After selling the reading room Caroline Massin found a rich lover who promised to help her, but then abandoned her with no money. Comte agreed to let her live with him rather than go back on the streets. In July 1824 a policeman recognised Caroline when the couple were eating at a restaurant. He threatened her with arrest for skipping the compulsory bi-weekly medical check-ups. Although she persuaded the policeman not to arrest her immediately, she had to go to the police station the next day, where the chief let her off but said she could only be removed from the registry of prostitutes if she married. Comte married her out of pity. The accusation of prostitution was almost certainly false and derived from Comte's paranoia and his inability to accept the complex, shrewd and independent personality of a woman like Caroline Massin who would not submit to him.)

Caroline heard of Comte's death in September 1857 and attended the commemorative ceremony in his apartment, to the horror of his disciples. When she heard of the contents of the "secret addition" she was furious. She exercised her rights as widow of an author and owner of their common property. The marriage contract between her and Comte said she had contributed 20,000 francs to the household, and she exerted the rights to this amount in cash or property. She also had the rights to his writings, and could decide what could be published. She specifically wanted the will and the correspondence between her husband and Clotilde de Vaux suppressed. She encouraged Littré to write a biography of Comte in which he would promote his scientific positivism, but discredit the last years of his life when his mind was degenerating. She also helped establish the Revue de la Philosophie Positive, which was effective in consolidating Comte's reputation.

Caroline Masson died on 27 January 1877 in Paris 75, aged 74. The insinuations in the "secret addition" have often been repeated by Comte's biographers. Letters that may have given a more complete picture were later destroyed by his disciples. Littré is the sole contemporary biographer to have given a sympathetic view of her character.

== Publications ==
- Comte, Auguste; Massin, Caroline (1993), correspondance inédite, 1831-1851 : l'histoire de Caroline Massin, épouse d'Auguste Comte, à travers leur correspondance / texte établi par Pascaline Gentil, notes by Bruno Gentil, introduction by Mary Pickering, Paris; Budapest; Kinshasa [etc.]: l'Harmattan, p. 326

== Sources ==
- Adams, Bert N.; Sydie, R. A. (2001-01-30), Sociological Theory, Pine Forge Press, ISBN 978-0-7619-8557-0
- Baehr, Peter (2017-09-08), Founders, Classics, Canons: Modern Disputes Over the Origins and Appraisal of Sociology's Heritage, Taylor & Francis, ISBN 978-1-351-51930-4
- Gane, Mike (2013-09-13), Harmless Lovers: Gender, Theory and Personal Relationships, Taylor & Francis, ISBN 978-1-136-14500-1
- Garric, Alain, "Caroline MASSIN", geneanet (in French)
- Guillin, Vincent (2009-08-31), Auguste Comte and John Stuart Mill on Sexual Equality: Historical, Methodological and Philosophical Issues, BRILL, ISBN 978-90-474-2815-2
- Hey, Wilf (Spring 2003), "Auguste Comte: High Priest of Humanity?", Vision.org
- Peterson, David J. (1999), Revoking the Moral Order: The Ideology of Positivism and the Vienna Circle, Lexington Books, ISBN 978-0-7391-0052-3
- Pickering, Mary (1993), Auguste Comte: Volume 1: An Intellectual Biography, Cambridge University Press, ISBN 978-0-521-02574-4
- Pickering, Mary (2006), "Introduction", Correspondance inédite (1831-1851): l'histoire de Caroline Massin, épouse d'Auguste Comte à travers leur correspondance (in French), Harmattan, ISBN 978-2-296-00725-3
