= Hierarchy of the sciences =

Hierarchical categorisation of different fields of science

Hierarchy of the Sciences by Auguste Comte

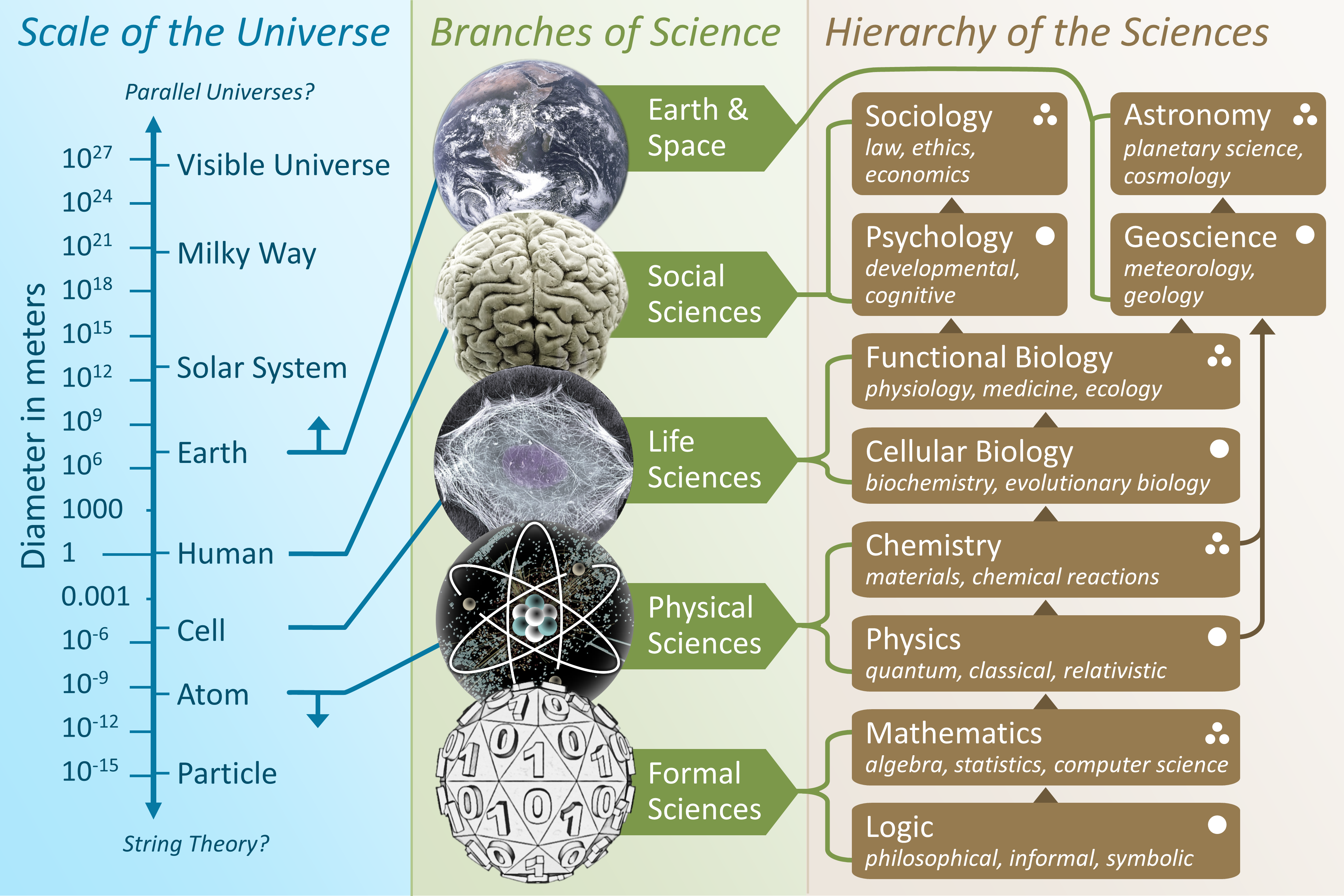
The scale of the Universe mapped to branches of science and showing how one system is built atop the next through the hierarchy of the sciences

The hierarchy of the sciences is a theory formulated by Auguste Comte in his Course of Positive Philosophy about 1835. This theory states that science develops over time beginning with the simplest and most general scientific discipline, astronomy, which is the first to reach the "positive stage" (one of three in Comte's law of three stages). As one moves up the "hierarchy", this theory further states that sciences become more complex and less general, and that they will reach the positive stage later. Disciplines further up the hierarchy are said to depend more on the developments of their predecessors; the highest discipline on the hierarchy are the social sciences. According to this theory, there are higher levels of consensus and faster rates of advancement in physics and other natural sciences than there are in the social sciences.

== Predecessors ==
Naturalist Lorenz Oken in his 1809 Lehrbuch der Naturphilosophie dedicated to Friedrich Schilling, classifies sciences as part of a whole (Ganz) that he divides in the mathesis (universal mathematical principles of nature) and ontology (later addressed as astronomy and the study of its sub-components). In ontology, can be subdivided in natural "kingdoms", first of minerals (mineralogy, geology) and second of biology (life forms as organic and pneumatic) sub-sectioned as phytology, physiology, zoology and psychology, with social and human-historical issues left untouched. Physics and chemistry are not addressed directly.

Philosopher Georg Wilhelm Friedrich Hegel in his 1830 Encyclopaedia of the Philosophical Sciences in Basic Outline, he classifies sciences by three levels, sciences of logic, sciences of nature and sciences of spirit. The sciences of nature are ordered as

1. mathematics
2. inorganic physics (as mechanics, elementary physics, and the physics of singularities)
3. organic physics (geological, vegetal and animal natures, with the last one carrying implications for psychology).

Hegel grouped both living and nonliving things under physics rather than chemistry. What we now call biology was treated as a branch of "organic physics." This meant that biology and psychology overlapped, especially in questions about the relationship between the brain and the mind, although Hegel did not discuss physiology.

Comte knew both about Oken and Hegel's work.

== Comte list ==
In Comte's work the sciences appear in the following order:

6. Mathematics, later termed logic
7. Astronomy
8. Physics
9. Chemistry
10. Physiology, also to be called biology
11. Social physics, or sociology as coined by Comte later

Comte's classification places sociology as the highest science, built on the more established sciences. His order begins with mathematics and progresses through astronomy, physics, chemistry, and biology to sociology, following increasing complexity. He believed the six fundamental sciences form a logical hierarchy, with each depending on the previous ones. Comte excluded psychology as metaphysical and focused on sociology as the scientific study of society.

== Evidence ==
Research has shown that, after controlling for the number of hypotheses being tested, positive results are 2.3 times more likely in the social sciences than in the physical sciences. It has also been found that the degree of scientific consensus is highest in the physical sciences, lowest in the social sciences, and intermediate in the biological sciences. Dean Simonton argues that a composite measure of the scientific status of disciplines ranks psychology much closer to biology than to sociology.

== Criticism ==
Pierre-Gilles de Gennes, Nobel laureate in Physics for his works on polymer physics and soft matter, criticized Comte's positivism in 1994, pointing it as the source of content for chemistry and other practical scientists among French scientists.

== See also ==
- Unity of science
