= Isidore Finance =

Isidore Finance (7 February 1848, Sainte-Croix-aux-Mines – 16 October 1918), Paris was a French house painter and decorator and syndicalist.

He was involved with the Cercle des prolétaires positivistes and contributed to Le Positivisme au Congrès Ouvrier with Fabien Magnin and Emile Laporte

At the Socialist Workers' Congress (1879) in Marseille Finance, he represented the building painters of Paris and urged "tough-fisted and hardheaded workingmen ... to demand a wage that is not simply the equivalent to the product of their labours, but sufficient to keep women and the aged at home."

== Works ==
- Discours sur los sooiétés coopératives 1877

== Sources ==
- "Finance, Isidore (1848-1918)", BnF Catalogue général (in French), Bibliothèque nationale de France
- Frader, Laura Levine; Rose, Sonya O. (1996), Gender and Class in Modern Europe, Cornell University Press, ISBN 0-8014-8146-5
