= Cercle des prolétaires positivistes =

The Cercle des prolétaires positivistes (Circle of Positivist Proletarians) was an organisation of working class positivists who advocated revolution were affiliated to the First International, i.e. the International Workingmen's Association (IWA). The Parisian Circle sent Gabriel Mollin as their delegate to the Basle Congress of the IWA. Subsequently, referred to as the 'Society of Positivist Proletarians', they applied for admission to the IWA. The General Council replied they must alter the constitution as regards their understanding of capital and join as proletarians rather than as positivists.

The Cercle was founded by Fabien Magnin.

The Cercle attended the Socialist Workers' Congress (1879) represented by Isidore Finance, who made a significant contribution to the proceedings.

== Notable members ==
- Fabien Magnin
- Gabriel Mollin
- Isidore Finance
- Auguste Keufer
