= Mollin =

Mollin is a surname. Notable people with the surname include:

- Bart Mollin (born 1981), Belgian alpine skier, competitor in the 2010 Winter Olympics
- Englebert Mollin known as Bart Mollin (1904–1945), Belgian wrestler, competitor in the 1924 Summer Olympics
- Fred Mollin, American record producer and composer
- Gabriel Mollin (1835–1912) French revolutionary
- Henri Mollin (1867–1958), French Army captain involved in the 1904 Affair of the Cards
- Henri Mollin (born 1958), Belgian alpine skier, competitor in the 1980 Winter Olympics and 1984 Winter Olympics
- Lucie Maria Mollin (1894–1971), wife of German General Erwin Rommel
- Maurice Mollin (1924–2003), Belgian racing cyclist
- Piet Mollin (born 1901), Belgian wrestler, competitor in the 1928 Summer Olympics
