= A General View of Positivism =

1844 book by Auguste Comte

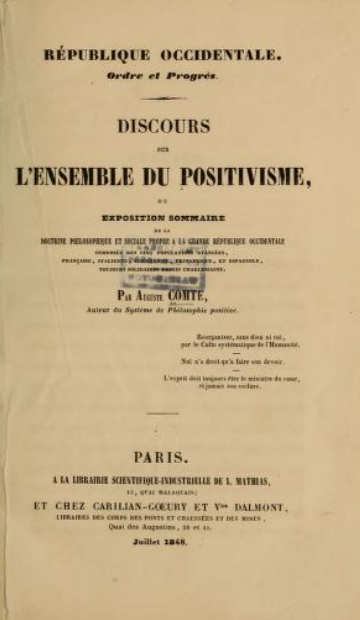
- Author: Auguste Comte
- Original title: Discours sur l'ensemble du positivisme
- Language: French
- Subject: Positivism
- Publication date: 1848
- English publication date: 1865
- Dewey Decimal: 146
- LC Class: B2228.E5

A General View of Positivism (French: Discours sur l'ensemble du positivisme) is an 1848 book by the French philosopher Auguste Comte, first published in English in 1865. A founding text in the development of positivism and the discipline of sociology, the work provides a revised and full account of the theory Comte presented earlier in his multi-part The Course in Positive Philosophy (1830–1842). Comte outlines the epistemological view of positivism, provides an account of the manner by which sociology should be performed, and describes his law of three stages.

== See also ==
- Religion of humanity
- Sociological positivism
