= Fabien Magnin =

Fabien Magnin (1810, Isère – 1884) was President of the Positivist Society.

Magnin was a carpenter. He became a positivist in 1840, becoming the first proletarian convert. Auguste Comte, the founder of positivism, appointed him to be President of the Positivist Society after his death. Magnin filled this role from 1857 to 1880, when he resigned. Magnin also spread workers positivism (le positivisme ouvrier). In 1863 he founded the Cercle des prolétaires positivistes which affiliated to the First International.

== Works ==
- (1861) Lettre sur la grève des ouvriers du bâtiment à Londres (Letter on the London builders' strike of 1859) Paris: Chez Dunod
