= Strategic positivism =

Strategic positivism is an approach that recognizes the limitations and potential of positivist methods, using them strategically for emancipatory goals. It draws on both classical and newer quantitative tools and builds infrastructure around epistemology, methodology, and political engagement.
