= French Workers Congress (1876) =

French Workers Congress Congrès ouvrier de France
- 1st

Type
- Type: Workers' congress

History
- Founded: October 2, 1876
- Disbanded: October 10, 1876
- Succeeded by: Lyon Workers Congress (1878)
- Seats: 360 delegates

Meeting place
- Salle des Écoles, Rue d'Arras, Paris

The French Workers Congress (Congrès ouvrier de France) was held in Paris from 2–10 October 1876. It was the first national labor congress in France following the suppression of the Paris Commune in 1871, and the first in a series of workers' congresses that would lead to the formation of organized socialist parties in France.

== Background ==
The brutal suppression of the Paris Commune in May 1871 devastated the French labor movement. Thousands of workers and militants were killed, imprisoned, or exiled, leaving the movement leaderless and demoralized for several years. Those who had been involved in politics under the Empire or had fought in the Commune were dead, exiled, or in hiding.

The impetus for the congress came from workers' delegations sent to international expositions. A French workers' delegation to the Philadelphia World's Fair in 1876 observed that American workers enjoyed greater freedom to organize and defend their interests through trade unions. Upon their return, the radical newspaper La Tribune proposed convening a workers' congress. Parisian trade unions embraced the idea and formed an organizing committee comprising citizens André, Chabert, A. Corsin, Delion, Deville, Eliézer, Gauttard, Guérin, Guillon, and Vernet.

Bourgeois republicans, fearing that the Republic might be overthrown by a monarchist conspiracy, supported the workers' organizing efforts as a means of building a popular base for the republican regime. Adolphe Crémieux, a former colleague of Léon Gambetta in the Government of National Defence, provided funding for provincial delegates to travel to Paris.

== Congress proceedings ==
The congress opened on 2 October 1876 in the Salle des Écoles on the Rue d'Arras in Paris. Approximately 360 delegates attended, representing 94 workers' organizations and two regional unions from Lyon and Bordeaux, claiming to speak for 1,100,000 wage workers.

The delegates addressed several key issues including trade union freedoms (chambres syndicales), reform of the prud'hommes labor courts, professional apprenticeship and training, female labor, and workers' representation in parliament. The congress also called for the eight-hour day, the abolition of night work in factories, and equal wages for women.

== Ideology ==
The congress was characterized by its cooperative and mutualist orientation, reflecting Proudhonist ideas rather than revolutionary socialism. The organizing committee explicitly rejected political ideologies and asserted the movement's independence from the state, declaring that "this congress be exclusively working class" and excluding non-workers from participation.

Paul Lafargue, Karl Marx's son-in-law, later characterized the congress as "exclusively a congress of co-operators" and criticized its "reactionary character" for returning to the small-shopkeeper utopias of Proudhon rather than advancing the movement initiated by the International Workingmen's Association. The delegates believed that cooperation would "radically resolve the social question" and saw it as the ultimate goal of the trade union movement.

Despite these limitations, socialist journalist Jules Guesde recognized the congress's importance, writing in Les Droits de l'Homme that "it was the first time that the proletariat was given the opportunity to make its voice heard."

== Legacy ==
The 1876 congress marked the revival of the French labor movement after its post-Commune devastation and established a pattern of national workers' congresses. It was followed by congresses in Lyon (1878) and Marseille (1879). At the Marseille congress, the movement broke decisively with the cooperative tradition, adopted collectivism, and founded the Federation of the Socialist Workers of France (Fédération des travailleurs socialistes de France), marking what the Guesdist journal L'Égalité proclaimed as "a new epoch" in French labor history.

== See also ==
- Socialist Workers' Congress (1879)
- French Section of the Workers' International
- French Workers' Party
