= Gabriel Mollin =

French revolutionary

Gabriel Mollin (September 15, 1835, Bourges – October 18, 1912) was a French revolutionary who successively advocated communism, positivism and anarchism.

He was by trade a metal gilder. He was a member of the Cercle des prolétaires positivistes and served as their delegate to the Basle Congress of the International Workingmen's Association (i.e. the First International) held in 1869.

He was married in 1873 and his wife had a child. In 1875 he was detained in the Sainte-Anne Hospital Centre after being diagnosed as suffering from mental derangement brought about by alcoholism. He left the asylum on 22 January 1876, accusing his psychiatrist and fellow positivist Jean-François Eugène Robinet of having him locked up so that his wife would leave and take away his son.
