= Socialist Workers' Congress (1879) =

Third Socialist Workers' Congress of France
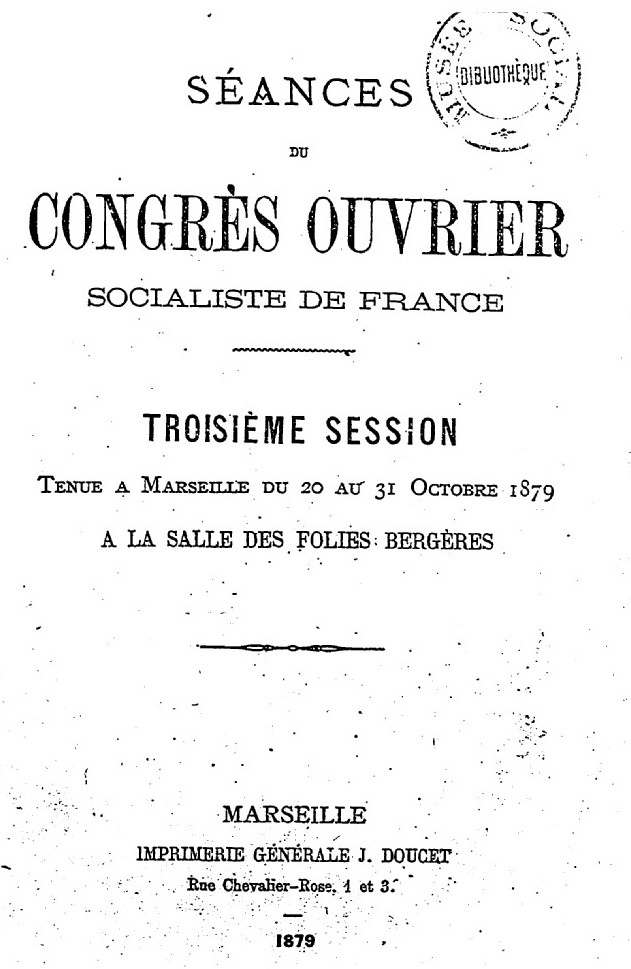
- Native name: Troisième Congrès ouvrier socialiste de France
- Date: 20–31 October 1879
- Venue: Salle des Folies-Bergères
- Location: Marseille, France
- Type: Political conference
- Participants: Trade union delegates and socialist leaders

The Third Socialist Workers' Congress of France was held in Marseille, France, in 1879. At this congress the socialist leaders rejected both cooperation and anarchism, both of which would allow the existing regime to continue, and adopted a program based on collectivism. The congress also adopted a motion that women should have equal rights to men, but several delegates felt that essentially woman's place was in the home. The congress has been called a triumph of Guesdism and the birthplace of French Marxist socialism, but both claims are open to question. The attendees soon split into rival groups with disparate beliefs.

== Location ==
The Third Socialist Workers' Congress was held in Marseille on 20–31 October 1879. It was held in the Salle des Folies-Bergères. (Note: Block 12 in the Rue de la République, Marseille, was built in 1866 by the architects Hilaire Curtil and Eric Buyron to house a casino, and later became the Folies Bergères music hall. After being rented to the Third National Workers Congress in 1879, in 1883 it was transformed into the Palace of Industry. In 1988 it became a multi-level indoor parking garage. The staircase has survived.) The Marseilles Congress followed the Congress of Lyon of 1878, and was the most important socialist congress in France before 1889 in terms of attendance, resolutions and its effect on the socialist party's constitution. The congress was followed by the 1880 Congress of Le Havre.

== Collectivism ==
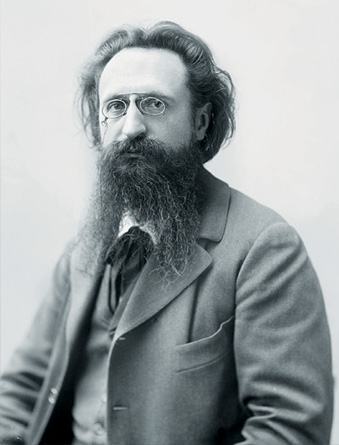
Jules Guesde could not attend in person, but his motion was adopted.

Jules Guesde was a former anarchist who had converted to Marxism in 1876. Guesde was sick and bedridden in Paris at the time of the congress, but was represented by two jewelry workers, Jean Lombard of Marseille and Eugène Fournière of Paris. A motion composed by Guesde was moved by the delegates from Paris and carried by a large majority. It was:

Property is the one social question. Seeing that the present system of property is opposed to those equal rights that will condition the society of the future; that it is unjust and inhuman that some should produce everything and others nothing, and that it is precisely the latter who have all the wealth, all the enjoyment, and all the privilege; seeing that this state of affairs will not be put an end to by the good-will of those whose whole interest lies in its continuance; the Congress adopts as its end and aim the collective ownership of the soil, the subsoil, the instruments of labour, raw materials, and would render them for ever inalienable from that society to which they ought to return.

The congress adopted a Marxist program and supported collectivism by 73 votes to 27. The collectivists rejected efforts to found cooperatives as being petty bourgeois and covert capitalism. The delegates were also opposed to cooperation and to anarchism, both of which left the status quo undisturbed, and declared themselves in favor of political action. The congress has been described as a triumph of Guesdism, but in fact was a triumph of collectivism, which Guesde's opponents Paul Brousse and Benoît Malon also supported.

== Foundation of the Socialist Party ==
The suppression of the Paris Commune in 1871 was a severe blow to socialism in France, and for several years afterwards workers were reluctant to get involved in politics. At the congresses of Paris (1876), Lyon (1878) and Marseille (1879) only working men could speak and vote, and discussion of politics was banned. However Guesde wanted to organize a political party. He claimed that unlike conventional parties the new party would serve the interests of the workers rather than the ambitions of the party leaders. The congress decided that the proletariat should separate itself from all the bourgeois parties and form a new party. At first the party represented artisans such as hatters and shoemakers, but not weavers, miners or foundry workers. The new party had to compete for the attention of the workers with the Blanquists, the Anarchists, after 1881 with the Possiblists, and after 1890 with the Allemanists.

Although the launch of the Parti Ouvrier (Party of Labour) by the 1879 congress has been treated by socialist and communist historians as the date when Marxist socialism was born in France, the new "party" was a loosely defined movement dominated by anti-political anarchists and anti-socialist radicals, with few members with recognizably Marxist views. It was only between the congress and the 1882 split that Guesde and Lafargue developed hardline Marxist positions. The party suffered from internal disagreements from the start. Anarchists such as Jean Grave disliked political involvement of any type, while Brousse was suspicious of Guesde's Marxist authoritarianism and thought the nationalization program would lead to a socialist dictatorship. (Note: There is disagreement among the sources about the sequence of events. Robert Gildea writes that the French Workers' Party (POF: Parti Ouvrier Français) was launched at the 1879 congress, and that Brousse won a majority against the Guesdists at the 1882 party conference and founded the Federation of the Socialist Workers of France (FTSF: Fédération des travailleurs socialistes de France). Julian Wright states that the split was formalized at the 1882 congress, which was controlled by Malon, when the Guesidists left to set up their separate group. Rudolf Rocker writes that the Fédération des Travailleurs came into being from the 1879 congress, controlled by the collectivists. The movement split at the Congress of Saint Étienne in 1883 with Guesde's followers forming the Parti Ouvrier Français supported by the Fédération Nationale des Syndicats and Brousse's followers forming the Parti Ouvrier Révolutionaire Socialiste Français supported by the Fédération des Bourse du Travail de France. The Allemanists later broke away from the Broussists. Other groups were the Blanquists of the Central Revolutionary Committee (CRC: Comité Révolutionaire Central) and Malon's Independent Socialists.)

== Women's rights ==
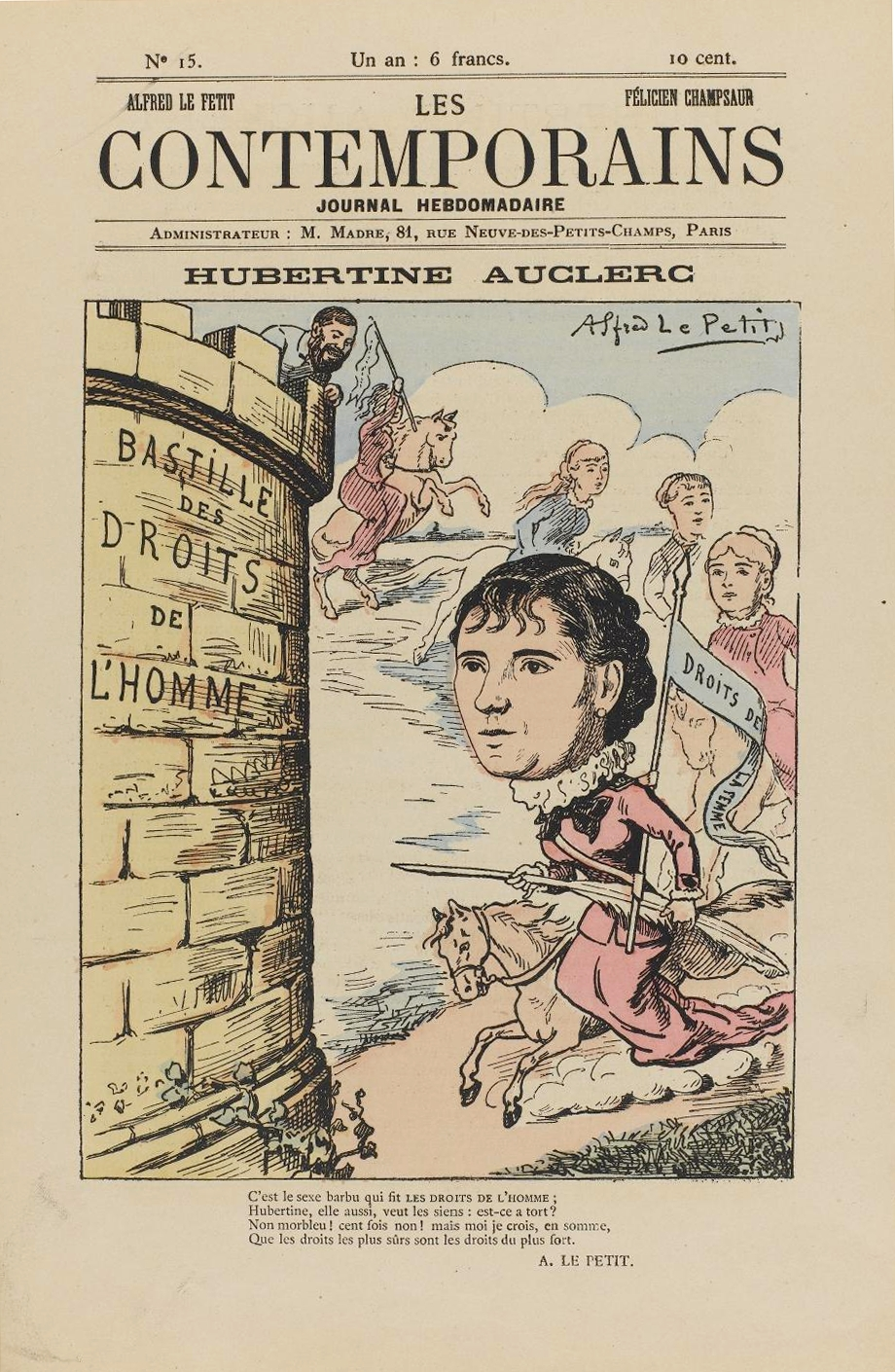
Hubertine Auclerc attacking the fortress of Men's Rights, by Alfred Le Petit from Les Contemporains (1881)

Some of the delegates defended the concept of the family wage, and argued against women's wage labour. One delegate said "woman's place is in the home, where so many daily concerns call her, and not in a factory or workshop ... The young girl should never learn any trade except those which, later, when she has become a wife and a mother, she can carry out in the home." Isidore Finance, who represented the building painters of Paris, urged "tough-fisted and hardheaded workingmen ... to demand a wage that is not simply the equivalent to the product of their labours, but sufficient to keep women and the aged at home."

Hubertine Auclert made passionate pleas for women's rights, but argued that they needed economic independence due to their "natural" motherhood. Auclert was on a special committee to consider the equality of women, and was given an hour to speak to the congress on this subject. After her speech she was invited to head a committee to prepare a statement on women's rights. This statement, which said women should have the same social, legal, political and working rights as men was approved by the congress.

== See also ==
- French Workers Congress (1876)
- Lyon Workers Congress (1878)

== Sources ==
- Bury, J.P.T. (2003-09-02), France, 1814-1940, Routledge, ISBN 978-1-134-37517-2
- Fortescue, William (2017-07-05), The Third Republic in France, 1870-1940: Conflicts and Continuities, Taylor & Francis, ISBN 978-1-351-54000-1
- Frader, Laura Levine; Rose, Sonya O. (1996), Gender and Class in Modern Europe, Cornell University Press, ISBN 0-8014-8146-5
- Frader, Laura Levine (2008-03-07), Breadwinners and Citizens: Gender in the Making of the French Social Model, Duke University Press, ISBN 978-0-8223-8881-4
- Gildea, Robert (2014-07-15), France 1870-1914, Routledge, ISBN 978-1-317-88721-8
- "Ilot 12 de la rue de la République", Inventaire général du Patrimoine culturel Région Provence-Alpes-Côte d'Azur (in French), Ministère de la Culture
- Lafargue, Paul (September 1897), "Socialism in France 1874-1896", Nineteenth Century, translated by Aveling
- Mayeur, Jean-Marie; Rebirioux, Madeleine (1987), The Third Republic from Its Origins to the Great War, 1871-1914, Cambridge University Press, ISBN 978-0-521-35857-6
- Monthoux, Pierre Guillet de (1993), The Moral Philosophy of Management: From Quesnay to Keynes, M.E. Sharpe, ISBN 978-1-56324-377-6
- Rocker, Rudolf (2004), Anarcho-Syndicalism: Theory and Practice, AK Press, ISBN 978-1-902593-92-0
- Stuart, Robert (2002-05-02), Marxism at Work: Ideology, Class and French Socialism During the Third Republic, Cambridge University Press, ISBN 978-0-521-89305-3
- Walsh, Margaret (2017-03-02), Working Out Gender: Perspectives from Labour History, Taylor & Francis, ISBN 978-1-351-87097-9
- Willard, Claude (1991), Jules Guesde: l'apôtre et la loi (in French), Editions de l'Atelier, ISBN 978-2-7082-2889-4
- Wright, Julian (2017-06-29), Socialism and the Experience of Time: Idealism and the Present in Modern France, OUP Oxford, ISBN 978-0-19-252466-9
