= Auguste Comte =

French philosopher and sociologist (1798–1857)

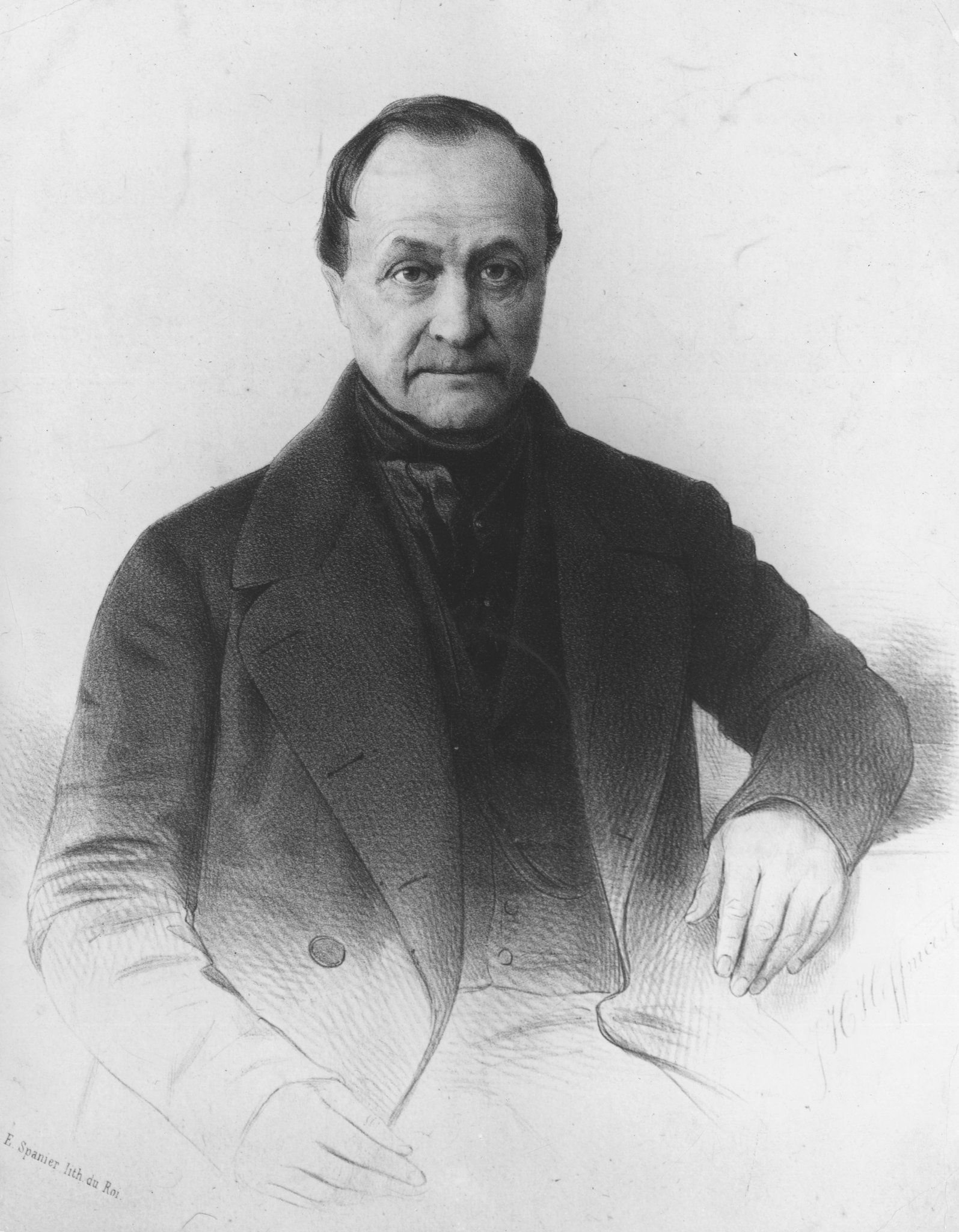
- Comte in 1849
- Born: Isidore Marie Auguste François Xavier Comte; 19 January 1798; Montpellier, French First Republic
- Died: 5 September 1857 (aged 59); Paris, Second French Empire
- Spouse: Caroline Massin (m. 1825; div. 1842)

Education
- Education: University of Montpellier; École Polytechnique
- Academic advisor: Henri de Saint-Simon

Philosophical work
- Era: 19th-century philosophy
- Region: Western philosophy: French philosophy
- School: Positivism
- Institutions: École Polytechnique
- Notable students: Charles Renouvier
- Notable ideas: Altruism; Encyclopedic law Hierarchy of the sciences Law of three stages Positivist calendar Religion of Humanity; Sociological positivism

Isidore Auguste Marie François Xavier Comte (/kɒ̃t/; French: [oɡyst(ə) kɔ̃t]; 19 January 1798 – 5 September 1857) was a French philosopher and writer who formulated the doctrine of positivism. He is often regarded as the first philosopher of science in the modern sense of the term. Comte's ideas were fundamental to the development of sociology, as he coined the term and treated the discipline as the crowning achievement of the sciences.

Influenced by Henri de Saint-Simon, Comte's work attempted to remedy the social disorder caused by the French Revolution, which he believed indicated an imminent transition to a new form of society. He sought to establish a new social doctrine based on science, which he labeled positivism. He had a major impact on 19th-century thought, influencing the work of social thinkers such as John Stuart Mill and George Eliot. His concept of Sociology and social evolutionism set the tone for early social theorists and anthropologists such as Harriet Martineau and Herbert Spencer, evolving into modern academic sociology presented by Émile Durkheim as practical and objective social research.

Comte's social theories culminated in his "Religion of Humanity", which presaged the development of non-theistic religious humanist and secular humanist organizations in the 19th century. He may also have coined the word altruism.

== Life ==
Auguste Comte was born in Montpellier, Hérault, on 19 January 1798, at the time under the rule of the newly founded French First Republic. After attending the Lycée Joffre and then the University of Montpellier, Comte was admitted to École Polytechnique in Paris. The École Polytechnique was notable for its adherence to the French ideals of republicanism and progress. The École closed in 1816 for reorganization, and Comte continued his studies at the medical school at Montpellier. When the École Polytechnique reopened, he did not request readmission.

Following his return to Montpellier, Comte soon came to see unbridgeable differences with his Catholic and monarchist family and set off again for Paris, earning money by small jobs. Comte had abandoned Catholicism under the influence of his first teacher and Protestant pastor Daniel Encontre.

In August 1817 he found an apartment at 36 Rue Bonaparte in Paris's 6th arrondissement (where he lived until 1822). Later that year he became a student and secretary to Henri de Saint-Simon, who brought Comte into contact with intellectual society and greatly influenced his thought therefrom. During that time, Comte published his first essays in the various publications headed by Saint-Simon, L'Industrie, Le Politique, and L'Organisateur (Charles Dunoyer and Charles Comte's Le Censeur Européen), although he would not publish under his own name until 1819's "La séparation générale entre les opinions et les désirs" ("The general separation of opinions and desires").

In 1824, Comte left Saint-Simon, again because of unbridgeable differences. Comte published a Plan de travaux scientifiques nécessaires pour réorganiser la société (1822) (Plan of scientific studies necessary for the reorganization of society). But he failed to get an academic post. His day-to-day life depended on sponsors and financial help from friends. Debates rage as to how much Comte appropriated the work of Saint-Simon.

Comte married Caroline Massin in 1825. In 1826, he was taken to a mental health hospital, but left without being cured – only stabilized by French alienist Jean-Étienne Dominique Esquirol – so that he could work again on his plan (he would later attempt suicide in 1827 by jumping off the Pont des Arts). In the time between this and their divorce in 1842, he published the six volumes of his Cours.

Comte developed a close friendship with John Stuart Mill. In 1844, he fell deeply in love with the Catholic Clotilde de Vaux, although because she was not divorced from her first husband, their love was never consummated. After her death in 1846, this love became quasi-religious, and Comte, working closely with Mill (who was refining his own such system) developed a new "Religion of Humanity". John Kells Ingram, an adherent of Comte, visited him in Paris in 1855.

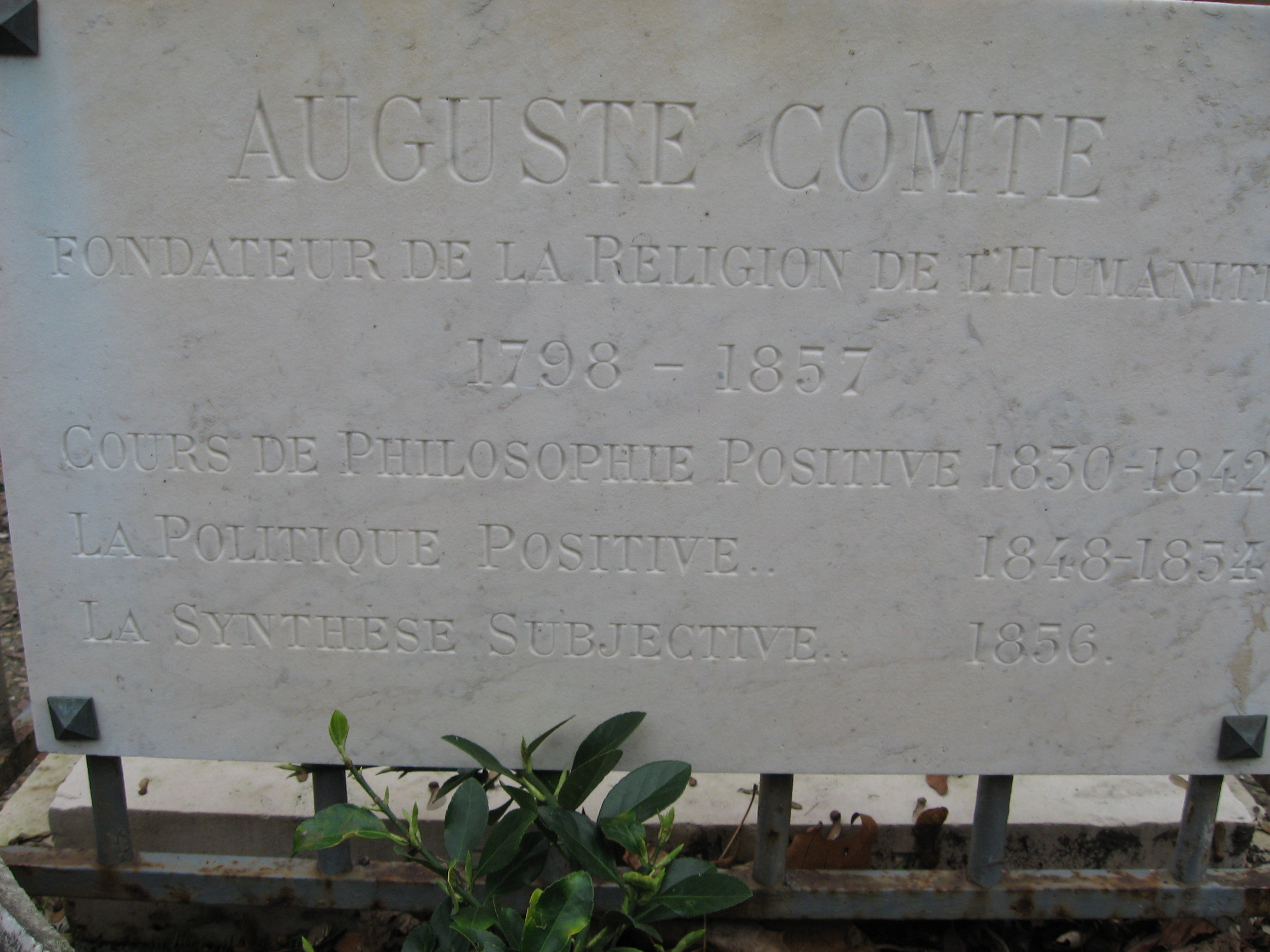
Tomb of Auguste Comte

He published four volumes of Système de politique positive (1851–1854). His final work, the first volume of La Synthèse Subjective ("The Subjective Synthesis"), was published in 1856. Comte died in Paris on 5 September 1857 from stomach cancer and was buried in the famous Père Lachaise Cemetery, surrounded by cenotaphs in memory of his mother, Rosalie Boyer, and of Clotilde de Vaux. His apartment from 1841 to 1857 is now conserved as the Maison d'Auguste Comte and is located at 10 rue Monsieur-le-Prince, in Paris' 6th arrondissement.

== Work ==
=== Comte's positivism ===
Comte first described the epistemological perspective of positivism in The Course in Positive Philosophy, a series of texts published between 1830 and 1842. These texts were followed by the 1848 work, A General View of Positivism (published in English in 1865). The first 3 volumes of the Course dealt chiefly with the physical sciences already in existence (mathematics, astronomy, physics, chemistry, biology), whereas the latter two emphasized the inevitable coming of social science. Observing the circular dependence of theory and observation in science, and classifying the sciences in this way, Comte may be regarded as the first philosopher of science in the modern sense of the term. Comte was also the first to distinguish natural philosophy from science explicitly. For him, the physical sciences had necessarily to arrive first, before humanity could adequately channel its efforts into the most challenging and complex "Queen science" of human society itself. His work View of Positivism would therefore set out to define, in more detail, the empirical goals of the sociological method.

Comte offered an account of social evolution, proposing that society undergoes three phases in its quest for the truth according to a general law of three stages.

Comte's stages were (1) the theological stage, (2) the metaphysical stage, and (3) the positive stage.

1. The Theological stage was seen from the perspective of 19th century France as preceding the Age of Enlightenment, in which man's place in society and society's restrictions upon man were referenced to God. Man blindly believed in whatever he was taught by his ancestors. He believed in supernatural power. Fetishism played a significant role during this time.
2. By the "Metaphysical" stage, Comte referred not to the Metaphysics of Aristotle or other ancient Greek philosophers. Rather, the idea was rooted in the problems of French society subsequent to the French Revolution of 1789. This Metaphysical stage involved the justification of universal rights as being on a vaunted higher plane than the authority of any human ruler to countermand, although said rights were not referenced to the sacred beyond mere metaphor. This stage is known as the stage of the investigation, because people started reasoning and questioning, although no solid evidence was laid. The stage of the investigation was the beginning of a world that questioned authority and religion.
3. In the Scientific stage, which came into being after the failure of the revolution and of Napoleon, people could find solutions to social problems and bring them into force despite the proclamations of human rights or prophecy of the will of God. Science started to answer questions in full stretch. In this regard, he was similar to Karl Marx and Jeremy Bentham. For its time, this idea of a Scientific stage was considered up-to-date, although, from a later standpoint, it is too derivative of classical physics and academic history.

Comte's law of three stages was one of the first theories of social evolutionism.

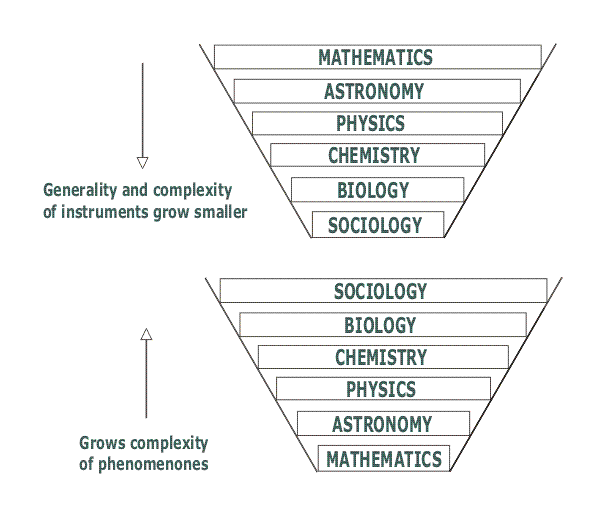
Comte's Theory of Science – According to him whole of sciences consists of theoretical and applied knowledge. Theoretical knowledge divides into general fields as physics or biology, which are an object of his research and detailed such as botany, zoology, or mineralogy. Main fields mathematics, astronomy, physics, chemistry, biology, and sociology it is possible to order according to a decrescent range of research and complicatedness of theoretical tools what is connected with the growing complexity of investigated phenomena. Following sciences are based on previous, for example, to methodically capture chemistry, we must imply acquaintance of physics, because all chemical phenomena are more complicated than physical phenomena, are also from them dependent and themselves do not have on them an influence. Similarly, sciences classified as earlier, are older and more advanced from these which are presented as later.

He once wrote: 'It is evident, the Solar System is badly designed'.

The other universal law he called the "encyclopedic law". By combining these laws, Comte developed a systematic and hierarchical classification of all sciences, including inorganic physics (astronomy, earth science and chemistry) and organic physics (biology and, for the first time, physique sociale, later renamed Sociologie). Independently from Emmanuel Joseph Sieyès's introduction of the term in 1780, Comte re-invented "sociologie", and introduced the term as a neologism, in 1838. Comte had earlier used the term "social physics", but that term had been appropriated by others, notably by Adolphe Quetelet.

The most important thing to determine was the natural order in which the sciences stand – not how they can be made to stand, but how they must stand, irrespective of the wishes of anyone...This Comte accomplished by taking as the criterion of the position of each the degree of what he called "positivity", which is simply the degree to which the phenomena can be exactly determined. This, as may be readily seen, is also a measure of their relative complexity, since the exactness of a science is in inverse proportion to its complexity. The degree of exactness or positivity is, moreover, that to which it can be subjected to mathematical demonstration, and therefore mathematics, which is not itself a concrete science, is the general gauge by which the position of every science is to be determined. Generalizing thus, Comte found that there were five great groups of phenomena of equal classificatory value but of successively decreasing positivity. To these, he gave the names: astronomy, physics, chemistry, biology, and sociology.

— Lester F. Ward, The Outlines of Sociology (1898)

This idea of a special science (not the humanities, not metaphysics) for the social was prominent in the 19th century and not unique to Comte. It has recently been discovered that the term "sociology" (as a term considered coined by Comte) had already been introduced in 1780, albeit with a different meaning, by the French essayist Emmanuel Joseph Sieyès (1748–1836). The ambitious (or many would say 'grandiose') ways that Comte conceived of this special science of the social, however, was unique. Comte saw this new science, sociology, as the last and greatest of all sciences, one which would include all other sciences and integrate and relate their findings into a cohesive whole. It has to be pointed out, however, that he noted a seventh science, one even greater than sociology. Namely, Comte considered "Anthropology, or true science of Man [to be] the last gradation in the Grand Hierarchy of Abstract Science."

The motto Ordem e Progresso ("Order and Progress") in the flag of Brazil is inspired by Auguste Comte's motto of positivism: L'amour pour principe et l'ordre pour base; le progrès pour but ("Love as a principle and order as the basis; Progress as the goal"). Several of those involved in the military coup d'état that deposed the Empire of Brazil and proclaimed Brazil to be a republic were followers of the ideas of Comte.

Comte's explanation of the Positive philosophy introduced the important relationship between theory, practice, and human understanding of the world. On page 27 of the 1855 printing of Harriet Martineau's translation of The Positive Philosophy of Auguste Comte, we see his observation that, "If it is true that every theory must be based upon observed facts, it is equally true that facts can not be observed without the guidance of some theories. Without such guidance, our facts would be desultory and fruitless; we could not retain them: for the most part, we could not even perceive them."

Comte's emphasis on the interconnectedness of social elements was a forerunner of modern functionalism. Nevertheless, as with many others of Comte's time, certain elements of his work are now viewed as eccentric and unscientific, and his grand vision of sociology as the centerpiece of all the sciences has not come to fruition.

His emphasis on a quantitative, mathematical basis for decision-making remains with us today. It is a foundation of the modern notion of Positivism, modern quantitative statistical analysis, and business decision-making. His description of the continuing cyclical relationship between theory and practice is seen in modern business systems of Total Quality Management (TQM) and Continuous Quality Improvement where advocates describe a continuous cycle of theory and practice through the four-part cycle of Plan-Do-Check-Act (PDCA, the Shewhart cycle). Despite his advocacy of quantitative analysis, Comte saw a limit in its ability to help explain social phenomena.

The early sociology of Herbert Spencer came about broadly as a reaction to Comte; writing after various developments in evolutionary biology, Spencer attempted to reformulate the discipline in what we might now describe as socially Darwinistic terms.

Comte's fame today owes in part to Émile Littré, who founded The Positivist Review in 1867.

Auguste Comte did not create the idea of Sociology, the study of society, patterns of social relationships, social interaction, and culture, but instead, he expanded it greatly. Positivism, the principle of conducting sociology through empiricism and the scientific method, was the primary way that Comte studied sociology. He split sociology into two different areas of study. One, social statics, how society holds itself together, and two, social dynamics, the study of the causes of societal changes. He saw these areas as parts of the same system. Comte compared society and sociology to the human body and anatomy. "Comte ascribed the functions of connection and boundaries to the social structures of language, religion, and division of labor." Through language, everybody in society, both past, and present, can communicate with each other. Religion unites society under a common belief system and functions in harmony under a system. Finally, the division of labor allows everyone in society to depend upon each other.

=== The utopian project ===
Comte is often disregarded when talking about utopia. However, he made many contributions to utopian literature and influenced the modern-day debate. Some intellectuals allude to the fact that the utopian system of modern life "served as a catalyst for various world-making activities during the nineteenth and early twentieth centuries" (Willson, M. 2019). In this utopian project, Comte introduces three major concepts: altruism, sociocracy, and the religion of Humanity. In the 19th century, Comte coined altruism as "a theory of conduct that regards the good of others as the end of moral action." (Britannica, T, 2013). Furthermore, Comte explains sociocracy as the governance by people who know each other, friends, or allies. After the French revolution, Comte was looking for a rational basis for government, after developing the Positivism philosophy he developed sociocracy to the "scientific method" of the government.

=== The religion of humanity ===
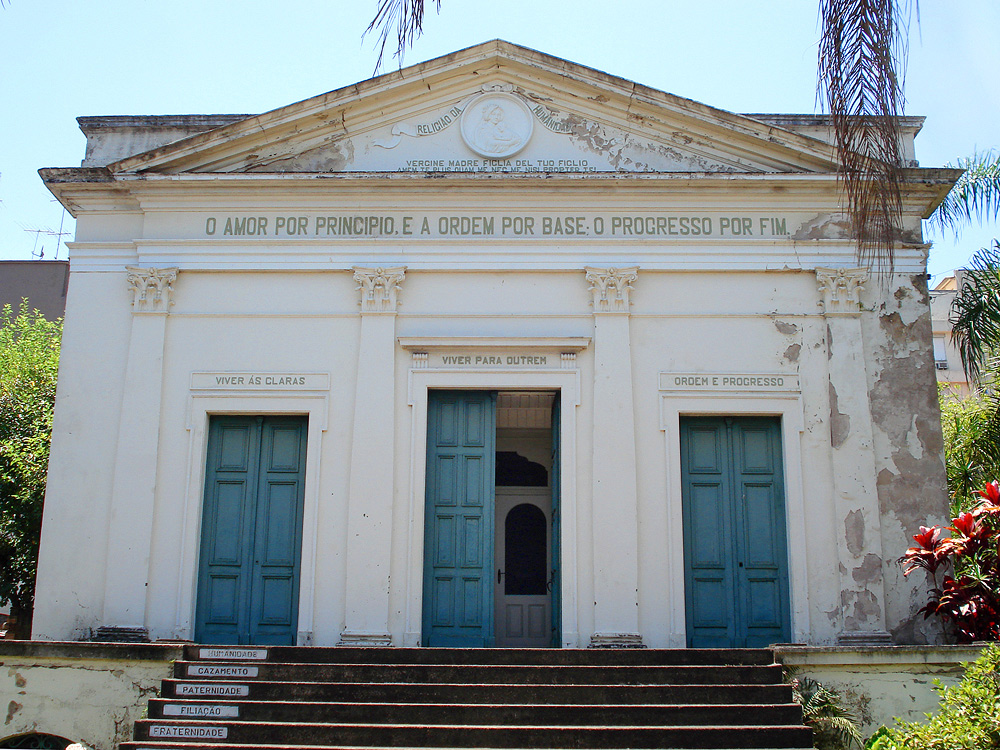
Positivist temple in Porto Alegre

In later years, Comte developed the Religion of Humanity for positivist societies to fulfil the cohesive function once held by traditional worship. In 1849, he proposed a calendar reform called the 'positivist calendar'. For close associate John Stuart Mill, it was possible to distinguish between a "good Comte" (the author of the Course in Positive Philosophy) and a "bad Comte" (the author of the secular-religious system). The system was unsuccessful but met with the publication of Darwin's On the Origin of Species (1859) to influence the proliferation of various Secular Humanist organizations in the 19th century, especially through the work of secularists such as George Holyoake and Richard Congreve. Although Comte's English followers, including George Eliot and Harriet Martineau, for the most part rejected the full gloomy panoply of his system, they liked the idea of a religion of humanity and his injunction to "vivre pour autrui" ("live for others"), from which comes the word "altruism".

=== Law of three stages ===
Comte was agitated by the fact that no one had synthesized physics, chemistry, and biology into a coherent system of ideas, so he began an attempt to reasonably deduce facts about the social world from the use of the sciences. Through his studies, he concluded that the growth of the human mind progresses in stages, and so must societies. He claimed the history of society could be divided into three different stages: theological, metaphysical, and positive. The Law of three Stages, an evolutionary theory, describes how the history of societies is split into three sections due to new thoughts on philosophy. Comte believed that evolution was the growth of the human mind, splitting into stages and evolving through these stages. Comte concluded that society acts similarly to the mind.

The law is this: that each of our leading conceptions – each branch of our knowledge – passes successively through three different theoretical conditions: the Theological, or fictitious; the Metaphysical, or abstract; and the Scientific, or positive.

— A. Comte

The Law of Three Stages is the evolution of society in which the stages have already occurred or are currently developing. The reason why there are newly developed stages after a certain time period is that the system "has lost its power" and is preventing the progression of civilization, causing complicated situations in society. (Lenzer 1975, pg 10) The only way to escape the situation is for people within the civilized nations to turn towards an "organic" new social system. Comte refers to kings to show the complications of re-establishment in society. Kings feel the need to reorganize their kingdom, but many fail to succeed because they do not consider that the progress of civilization needs reform, not perceiving that there is nothing more perfect than inserting a new, more harmonious system. Kings fail to see the effectiveness of abandoning old systems because they do not understand the nature of the present crisis. But in order to progress, there need to be the necessary consequences that come with it, which is caused by a "series of modifications, independent of the human will, to which all classes of society contributed, and of which kings themselves have often been the first agents and most eager promoters". The people themselves have the ability to produce a new system. This pattern is shown through the theological stage, metaphysical stage, and positive stage, which make up The Law of Three Stages. The theological stage happened before the 1300s, in which all societies lived a life that was completely theocentric. The metaphysical stage was when the society seeks universal rights and freedom. With the third and final stage, the positive stage, Comte takes a stand on the question, "how should the relations among philosophy of science, history of science, and sociology of science be seen." He says that sociology and history are not mutually exclusive, but that history is the method of sociology, thus he calls sociology the "final science". This positive stage was to solve social problems and forcing these social problems to be fixed without care for "the will of God" or "human rights". Comte finds that these stages can be seen across different societies across all of history.

==== Theological stage ====
The first stage, the theological stage, relies on supernatural or religious explanations of the phenomena of human behavior because "the human mind, in its search for the primary and final causes of phenomena, explains the apparent anomalies in the universe as interventions of supernatural agents". The Theological Stage is the "necessary starting point of human intelligence" when humans turn to supernatural agents as the cause of all phenomena. In this stage, humans focus on discovering absolute knowledge. Comte disapproved of this stage because it turned to simple explanation humans created in their minds that all phenomena were caused by supernatural agents, rather than human reason and experience. Comte refers to Bacon's philosophy that "there can be no real knowledge except that which rests upon observed facts", but he observes that the primitive mind could not have thought that way because it would have only created a vicious circle between observations and theories. "For if, on the one hand, every positive theory must necessarily be founded upon observations, it is, on the other hand, no less true that, in order to observe, our mind has need of some theory or other". Because the human mind could not have thought in that way in the origin of human knowledge, Comte claims that humans would have been "incapable of remembering facts", and would not have escaped the circle if it were not for theological conceptions, which were less complicated explanations to human life. Although Comte disliked this stage, he explains that theology was necessary at the beginning of the developing primitive mind.

The first theological state is the necessary starting point of human intelligence. The human mind primarily focuses its attention on the "inner nature of beings and to the first and final causes of all phenomena it observes." (Ferre 2) This means that the mind is looking for the cause and effect of an action that will govern the social world. Therefore, it "represents these phenomena as being produced by a direct and continuous action of more or less numerous supernatural agents, whose arbitrary interventions explain all the apparent anomalies of the universe." (Ferre 2)

This primary subset of the theological state is known as fetishism, where the phenomena must be caused and created by a theological supernatural being such as God, making humans view every event in the universe as a direct will from these supernatural agents. Some people believed in souls or spirits that possessed inanimate objects and practiced Animism. These natural spiritual beings who possessed souls and may exist apart from the material bodies were capable of interacting with humans, therefore requiring sacrifices and worship to please the agents.

With all these new reasons behind phenomena, numerous fetishisms occur, needing several gods to continue to explain events. People begin to believe that every object or event has a unique god attached to it. This belief is called polytheism. The mind "substituted the providential action of a single being for the varied play of numerous independent gods which have been imagined by the primitive mind."

These gods often took on both human and animal resemblance. In Egypt, there were multiple gods with animal body parts such as Ra, who had the head of a hawk and had sun associations with the Egyptians. The polytheistic Greeks had several gods such as Poseidon who controlled the sea and Demeter who was the goddess of fertility. However, with all these new gods governing the phenomena of society, the brain can get confused with the numerous gods it needs to remember.

The human mind eliminates this problem by believing in a sub-stage called monotheism. Rather than having multiple gods, there is simply one all-knowing and omnipotent God who is the center of power controlling the world. This creates harmony with the universe because everything is under one ruler. This leaves no confusion of how to act or who is the superior ruler out of the several gods seen in polytheism. The theological state functions well as the first state of the mind when making a belief about an event because it creates a temporary placeholder for the cause of the action which can later be replaced. By allowing the brain to think of the reason behind phenomena, the polytheistic gods are fillers that can be replaced by monotheistic gods.

The theological stage shows how the primitive mind views supernatural phenomena and how it defines and sorts the causes. "The earliest progress of the human mind could only have been produced by the theological method, the only method which can develop spontaneously. It alone has the important property of offering us a provisional theory,… which immediately groups the first facts, with its help, by cultivating our capacity for observation, we were able to prepare the age of a wholly positive philosophy." (Comte 149)

Comte believed the theological stage was necessary because of the foundational belief that man's earliest philosophy of explanation is the act of connecting phenomena around him to his own actions; that man may "apply the study of external nature to his own". This first stage is necessary to remove mankind from the "vicious circle in which it was confined by the two necessities of observing first, in order to form conceptions, and of forming theories first, in order to observe". Additionally, the theological stage is able to organize society by directing "the first social organization, as it first forms a system of common opinions, and by forming such a system". Though, according to Comte, it could not last, this stage was able to establish an intellectual unity that made an impressive political system. The theological state was also necessary for human progress on account that it creates a class in a society dedicated to "speculative activity". It is in this way that Comte sees the theological stage continue to exist into the Enlightenment. Comte momentarily admires the theological stage for its remarkable ability to enact this activity amidst a time when it was argued to be impractical. It is to this stage that the human mind owes "the first effectual separation between theory and practice, which could take place in no other manner" other than through the institution provided by the theological stage.

The Theological Stage is the stage that was seen primarily among the civilizations in the distant past. Having been used before the 1300s, this is a very basic view of the world with little to no involvement in the world of science, and a world of illusions and delusions, as Freud would put it. To seek the nature of all beings, mankind puts its focus on sentiments, feelings, and emotions. This turned mankind towards theology and the creation of gods to answer all their questions.

The Theological Stage is broken into three sections:

1. Fetishism is the philosophy in which mankind puts the power of a god into an inanimate object. Every object could hold this power of a god, so it started to confuse those who believed in Fetishism and created multiple gods.
2. Polytheism is, in basic terms, the belief in an order of multiple gods who rule over the universe. Within polytheism, each god is assigned a specific thing in which they are the god of. Examples of this would be the Greek god, Zeus, the god of the sky/lightning, or Ra, the sun god, in Egyptian mythology. A group of priests was often assigned to these gods to offer sacrifices and receive blessings from those gods, but once again, because of the innumerable number of gods, it got confusing, so civilization turned to Monotheism.
3. Monotheism is the belief in one, all-powerful God who rules over every aspect of the universe. The removal of an emotional and imaginational aspects of both Fetishism and Polytheism resulted in intellectual awakening. This removal allowed for the Enlightenment to occur as well as the expansion of the scientific world. With the Enlightenment came many famous philosophers who brought about a great change in the world. This is the reason why "Monotheism is the climax of the theological stage of thinking."

==== Metaphysical or abstract stage ====
The second stage, the metaphysical stage, is merely a modification of the first because a supernatural cause is replaced by an "abstract entity"; it is meant to be a transitional stage, where there is the belief that abstract forces control the behavior of human beings. Because it is a transitional stage between the theological stage and the positive stage, Comte deemed it the least important of the three stages and was only necessary because the human mind cannot make the jump from the theological to the positive stage on its own.

The metaphysical stage is the transitional stage. Because "Theology and physics are so profoundly incompatible", and their "conceptions are so radically opposed in character", human intelligence must have a gradual transition. Other than this, Comte says that there is no other use for this stage. Although it is the least important stage, it is necessary because humans could not handle the significant change in thought from theological to positivity. The metaphysical stage is just a slight modification of the previous stage when people believed in the abstract forces rather than the supernatural. The mind begins to notice the facts themselves, caused by the emptiness of the metaphysical agents through "over subtle qualification that all right-minded persons considered them to be only the abstract names of the phenomena in question". The mind becomes familiar with concepts, wanting to seek more, and therefore is prepared to move into the positive stage.

Comte explains the theological and positive stages first and only then returns to explain the metaphysical stage. His rationale in this decision is that "any intermediate state can be judged only after a precise analysis of two extremes". Only upon arrival to the rational positive state can the metaphysical state be analyzed, serving only a purpose of aiding in the transition from the theological to a positive state. Furthermore, this state "reconciles, for a time, the radical opposition of the other two, adapting itself to the gradual decline of the one and the preparatory rise of the other". Therefore, the transition between the two states is almost unperceivable. Unlike its predecessor and successor, the metaphysical state does not have a strong intellectual foundation nor social power for a political organization. Rather it simply serves to guide man until the transition from imaginative theological state to rational positive state is complete.

==== Positive stage ====
The last stage – the positive stage – is when the mind stops searching for the cause of phenomena and realizes that laws exist to govern human behavior and that this stage can be explained rationally with the use of reason and observation, both of which are used to study the social world. This stage relies on science, rational thought, and empirical laws. Comte believed that this study of sociology he created was "the science that [came] after all the others; and as the final science, it must assume the task of coordinating the development of the whole of knowledge" because it organized all of human behavior.

The final, most evolved stage is the positivist stage, the stage when humans give up on discovering absolute truth, and turn towards discovering, through reasoning and observation, actual laws of phenomena. Humans realize that laws exist and that the world can be rationally explained through science, rational thought, laws, and observation.

Comte was a positivist, believing in the natural rather than the supernatural, and so he claimed that his time period, the 1800s, was in the positivist stage. He believed that within this stage, there is a hierarchy of sciences: mathematics, astronomy, terrestrial physics, chemistry, and physiology. Mathematics, the "science that relates to the measurement of magnitudes", is the most perfect science of all, and is applied to the most important laws of the universe. Astronomy is the most simple science and is the first "to be subjected to positive theories". Physics is less satisfactory than astronomy, because it is more complex, having less pure and systemized theories. Physics, as well as chemistry, are the "general laws of the inorganic world", and are harder to distinguish. Physiology completes the system of natural sciences and is the most important of all sciences because it is the "only solid basis of the social reorganization that must terminate the crisis in which the most civilized nations have found themselves". This stage will fix the problems in current nations, allowing progression and peace.

It is through observation that humanity is able to gather knowledge. The only way within society to gather evidence and build upon what we do not already know to strengthen society is to observe and experience our situational surroundings. "In the positive state, the mind stops looking for causes of phenomena, and limits itself strictly to laws governing them; likewise, absolute notions are replaced by relative ones," The imperfection of humanity is not a result of the way we think, rather our perspective that guides the way we think.

Comte expresses the idea that we have to open our eyes to different ideas and ways to evaluate our surroundings such as focusing outside of the simple facts and abstract ideas but instead dive into the supernatural. This does not make mean that what is around us is not critical to look out for as our observations are critical assets to our thinking. The things that are "lost" or knowledge that is in the past are still relevant to recent knowledge. It is what is before our time that guides why things are the way they are today. We would always be relying on our own facts and would never hypothesize to reveal the supernatural if we do not observe.

Observing strives to further our thinking processes. According to Comte, "'The dead govern the living,' which is likely a reference to the cumulative nature of positivism and the fact that our current world is shaped by the actions and discoveries of those who came before us". As this is true, the observations only relevant to humanity and not abstractly related to humanity are distinct and seen situationally. The situation leads to human observation as a reflection of the tension in society can be reviewed, overall helping to enhance knowledge development.

Upon our observation skills, our thinking shifts. As thinkers and observers, we switch from trying to identify truth and turn toward the rationality and reason nature brings, giving us the ability to observe. This distinct switch takes on the transition from the abstract to the supernatural.

"Comte's classification of the sciences was based upon the hypothesis that the sciences had developed from the understanding of simple and abstract principles to the understanding of complex and concrete phenomena." Instead of taking what we believe to be true we turn it around to use the phenomena of science and the observation of natural law to justify what we believe to be true within society. The condensing and formulation of human knowledge is what Comte drives us toward to ultimately build the strongest society possible. If scientists do not take the chance to research why a certain animal species is going extinct and their facts researched by those in the past are no longer true of the present, how is the data supposed to grow? How are we to gain more knowledge?

These facts of life are valuable, but it is beyond these facts that Comte gestures us to look to. Instead of the culmination of facts with little sufficiency, knowledge altogether takes on its role in the realm of science. In connection to science, Comte relates to science in two specific fields to rebuild the construction of human knowledge. As science is broad, Comte reveals this scientific classification for the sake of thinking and the future organization of society. "Comte divided sociology into two main fields, or branches: social statistics, or the study of the forces that hold society together; and social dynamics, or the study of the causes of social change". In doing this, society is reconstructed. By reconstructing human thinking and observation, societal operation alters. The attention is drawn to science, hypothesis', natural law, and supernatural ideas, allows sociology to be divided into these two categories.

By combining the simple facts from the abstract to the supernatural and switching our thinking towards hypothetical observation, the sciences culminate in order to formulate sociology and this new societal division. "Every social system… aims definitively at directing all special forces towards a general result, for the exercise of a general and combined activity is the essence of the society". Social phenomena Comte believed can be transferred into laws and that systemization could become the prime guide to sociology so that all can maintain knowledge to continue building a strong intellectual society.

To continue building a strong intellectual society, Comte believed the building or reformation requires intricate steps to achieve success. First, the new society must be created after the old society is destroyed because "without…destruction no adequate conception could be formed of what must be done". Essentially a new society cannot be formed if it is constantly hindered by the ghost of its past. On the same terms, there will be no room for progress if the new society continues to compare itself to the old society. If humanity does not destroy the old society, the old society will destroy humanity.

Or on the other hand, if one destroys the old society, "without ever replacing it, the people march onwards towards total anarchy". If the society is continuously chipped away without being replaced with new ideal societal structures, then society will fall deeper back into its old faults. The burdens will grow deep and entangle the platforms for the new society, thus prohibiting progress, and ultimately fulfilling the cursed seesaw of remodeling and destroying society. Hence, according to Comte, to design a successful new society, one must keep the balance of reconstruction and deconstruction.

== Other views ==
Auguste Comte is well known for writing in his book The Positive Philosophy that people would never learn the chemical composition of the stars. This has been called a very poor prediction regarding human limits in science. In thirty years people were beginning to learn the composition of stars through spectroscopy.

=== Counter Revolutionary Influences ===
Comte was also influenced by counter-revolutionary critics of the French Revolution, including Joseph de Maistre. with whom he shared the concerns that "moral anarchy" was both a "scourge" of the nineteenth century and came from the lack of a unifying doctrine, although Comte rejected Maistre's Catholicism and royalism. Scholars have noted that Comte secularised some themes associated with Maistre, particularly the idea that social cohesion depends on shared beliefs and institutions rather than individual reason alone.

He was also interested in similar authors such as Bonald and Lamennais.

=== Islam ===
In his earlier works, Comte criticized Islam (then often referred to as “Mohammedanism”) as a less rational or progressive religion compared to Western monotheistic traditions. However — especially in his later texts such as System of Positive Polity — Comte reassessed his position. He came to view Islam and Islamic civilization more favorably, praising what he regarded as the religion’s doctrinal simplicity, communal rituals, and civilizational history — factors he believed made Islam especially suited to transition toward the “positive religion” he envisioned. Comte even proposed borrowing certain symbolic and ritual-organizational elements from Islam (for example, a fixed direction for worship, akin to the qibla) for the global “religion of humanity.” His confidant Pierre Laffitte even named Comte's apartment "our Kaaba." He acknowledged that his earlier judgments reflected the prejudices of his time (particularly anti-Islamic biases common in Catholic/Enlightenment milieus) and admitted to having been mistaken, especially in his System of Positive Polity. This evolution influenced later positivist thinkers and helped explain why certain Muslim intellectuals and movements — especially in the late 19th and early 20th centuries — found positivism compatible with Islamic identity.

== Honours and awards ==
Chevalier of the Order of Legion of Honour (1842)

== Bibliography ==
- A general view of positivism [Discours sur l'ensemble du positivisme, 1848] London, 1856
- Bridges, J.H. (tr.); A General View of Positivism; Trubner and Co., 1865 (reissued by Cambridge University Press, 2009; ISBN 978-1-108-00064-2)
- Cours de Philosophie Positive; Bachelier, Paris, 1835. In six parts; transcriptions at Project Gutenberg and scans at Projet Gallica
- Comte, Auguste. The Catechism of Positive Religion. Translated by Congreve, Richard. London: John Chapman. ISBN 978-1-108-00087-1 – via Internet Archive.
- with Gertrud Lenzer. Auguste Comte and Positivism the Essential Writings. Transaction Publishers, 1998.
- Martineau, H. (tr.); The Positive Philosophy of Auguste Comte; 2 volumes; Chapman, 1853 (reissued by Cambridge University Press, 2009; ISBN 978-1-108-00118-2) (but note that Cambridge University Press said "Martineau's abridged and more easily digestible version of Comte's work was intended to be readily accessible to a wide general readership, particularly those she felt to be morally and intellectually adrift", so this is not really Comte's own writings)
- Jones, H.S. (ed.); Comte: Early Political Writings; Cambridge University Press, 1998; ISBN 978-0-521-46923-4
- System of Positive Polity; various publishers
- with Ferré Frederick. Introduction to Positive Philosophy. Hackett Pub. Co., 1988.
- with H. S. Jones. Early Political Writings. Cambridge University Press, 2003.

== Sources ==
- Pickering, Mary (1993). Auguste Comte: An Intellectual Biography. Vol. 1. Cambridge: Cambridge University Press. ISBN 052143405X.
- Pickering, Mary (2009a). Auguste Comte: An Intellectual Biography. Vol. 2. Cambridge: Cambridge University Press.
- Pickering, Mary (2009b). Auguste Comte: An Intellectual Biography. Vol. 3. Cambridge: Cambridge University Press.
