= Course of Positive Philosophy =

Book by Auguste Comte

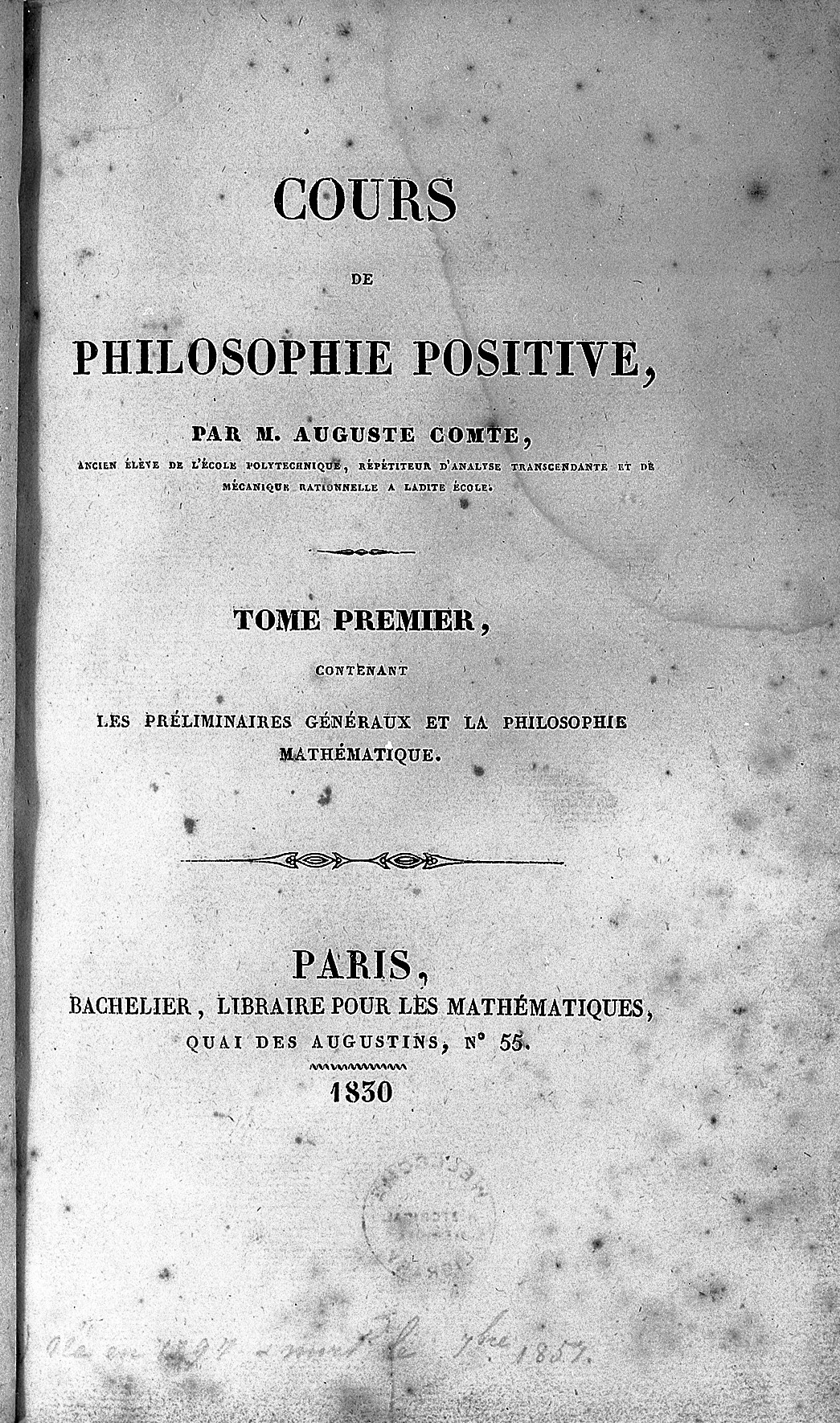
- Author: Auguste Comte
- Original title: Cours de Philosophie Positive
- Genre: sociology
- Publication date: 1830-1842

The Course of Positive Philosophy (Cours de Philosophie Positive) was a series of texts written by the French philosopher of science and founding sociologist, Auguste Comte, between 1830 and 1842. Within the work he unveiled the epistemological perspective of positivism. The works were translated into English by Harriet Martineau and condensed to form The Positive Philosophy of Auguste Comte (1853). It has been described as a foundational text for the discipline of sociology. It introduces topics like the hierarchy of the sciences and the law of three stages.

== Content ==
The first three volumes of the Course dealt chiefly with the physical sciences already in existence (mathematics, astronomy, physics, chemistry, biology), whereas the latter two emphasised the inevitable coming of social science. It is in observing the circular dependence of theory and observation in science, and classifying the sciences in this way, that Comte may be regarded as the first philosopher of science in the modern sense of the term. According to his hierarchy of the sciences, the physical sciences, which were 'simple', had necessarily to arrive first, before humanity could adequately channel its efforts into the most challenging and complex "queen science" of human society itself. Comte believed that social harmony is possible only when there is intellectual harmony, which is in turn possible only when all social sciences have entered the phase of positivism, with sociology being the last to arrive. Then everybody should be taught modern science so that they can internalize the new scientific values in their lives. His A General View of Positivism (published in English in 1865) would therefore set out to define, in more detail, the empirical goals of sociology.
