= Positivism =

Empiricist philosophical theory

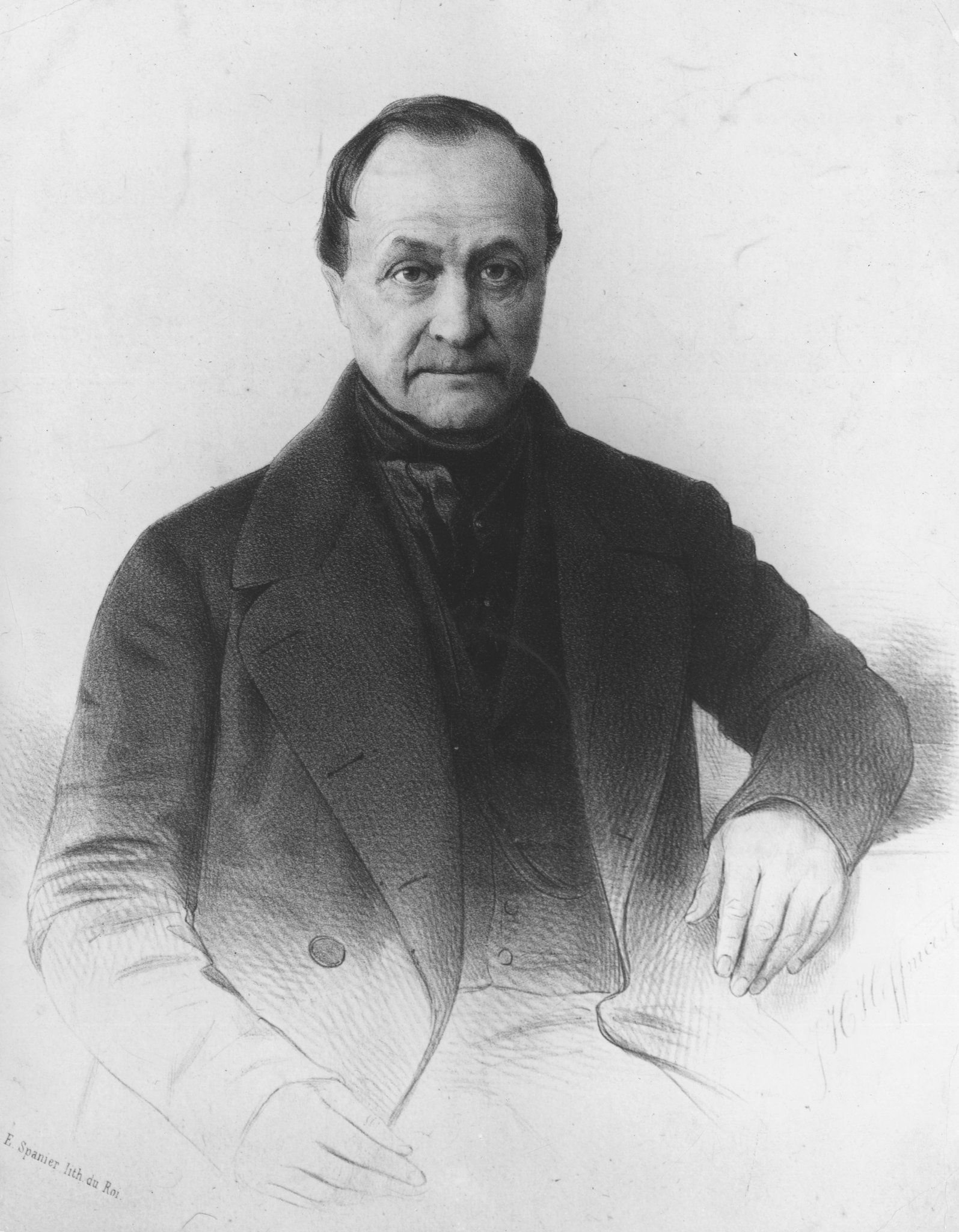
Auguste Comte, the founder of modern positivism

Positivism is a philosophical school that holds that all genuine knowledge is either true by definition or positive—the latter meaning a posteriori facts derived by reason and logic from sensory experience. Other ways of knowing, such as intuition, introspection, or religious faith, are rejected or considered meaningless.

Although the positivist approach has been a recurrent theme in the history of Western thought, modern positivism was first articulated in the early 19th century by Auguste Comte. His school of sociological positivism holds that society, like the physical world, operates according to scientific laws. After Comte, positivist schools arose in logic, psychology, economics, historiography, and other fields of thought. Generally, positivists attempted to introduce scientific methods to their respective fields. Since the turn of the 20th century, positivism, although still popular, has declined under criticism within the social sciences by antipositivists and critical theorists, among others, for its alleged scientism, reductionism, overgeneralizations, and methodological limitations. Positivism also exerted a substantial influence on Kardecism.

== Etymology ==
The English noun positivism in this meaning was imported in the 19th century from the French word positivisme, derived from positif in its philosophical sense of 'imposed on the mind by experience'. The corresponding adjective (Latin: positivus) has been used in a similar sense to discuss law (positive law compared to natural law) since the time of Chaucer.

== Background ==
Kieran Egan argues that positivism can be traced to the philosophy side of what Plato described as the quarrel between philosophy and poetry, later reformulated by Wilhelm Dilthey as a quarrel between the natural sciences (German: Naturwissenschaften) and the human sciences (Geisteswissenschaften).

In the early nineteenth century, massive advances in the natural sciences encouraged philosophers to apply scientific methods to other fields. Thinkers such as Henri de Saint-Simon, Pierre-Simon Laplace and Auguste Comte believed that the scientific method, the circular dependence of theory and observation, must replace metaphysics in the history of thought.

== Positivism in the social sciences ==
=== Comte's positivism ===
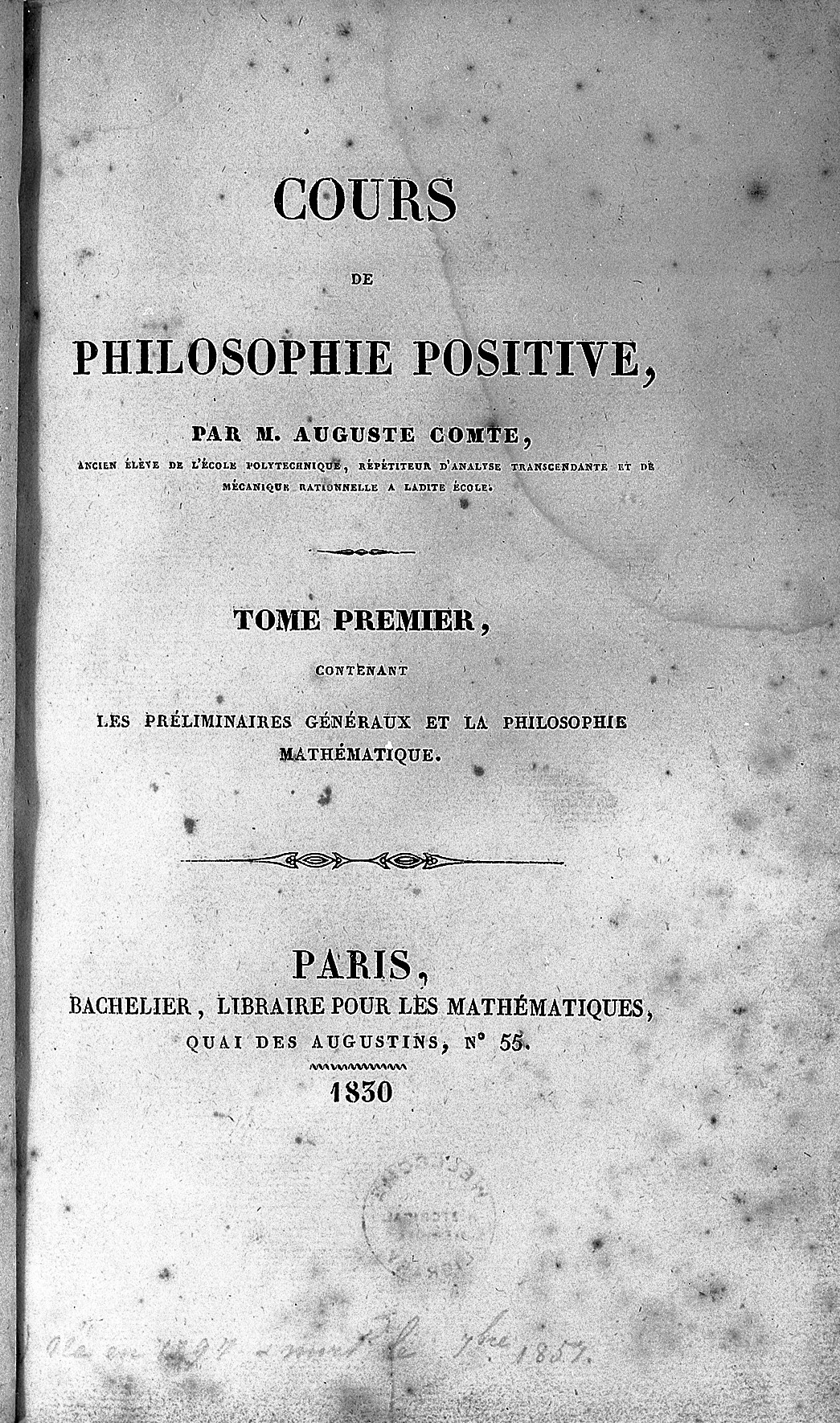
Comte first laid out his theory of positivism in The Course in Positive Philosophy.

Auguste Comte (1798–1857) first described the epistemological perspective of positivism in The Course in Positive Philosophy, a series of texts published between 1830 and 1842. These texts were followed in 1844 by A General View of Positivism (published in French 1848, English in 1865). The first three volumes of the Course dealt chiefly with the physical sciences already in existence (mathematics, astronomy, physics, chemistry, biology), whereas the latter two emphasized the inevitable coming of social science. Observing the circular dependence of theory and observation in science, and classifying the sciences in this way, Comte may be regarded as the first philosopher of science in the modern sense of the term. For him, the physical sciences had necessarily to arrive first, before humanity could adequately channel its efforts into the most challenging and complex "Queen science" of human society itself. His View of Positivism therefore set out to define the empirical goals of sociological method:

The most important thing to determine was the natural order in which the sciences stand—not how they can be made to stand, but how they must stand, irrespective of the wishes of any one. ... This Comte accomplished by taking as the criterion of the position of each the degree of what he called "positivity," which is simply the degree to which the phenomena can be exactly determined. This, as may be readily seen, is also a measure of their relative complexity, since the exactness of a science is in inverse proportion to its complexity. The degree of exactness or positivity is, moreover, that to which it can be subjected to mathematical demonstration, and therefore mathematics, which is not itself a concrete science, is the general gauge by which the position of every science is to be determined. Generalizing thus, Comte found that there were five great groups of phenomena of equal classificatory value but of successively decreasing positivity. To these he gave the names astronomy, physics, chemistry, biology, and sociology.

— Lester F. Ward, The Outlines of Sociology (1898),

Comte offered an account of social evolution, proposing that society undergoes three phases in its quest for the truth according to a general "law of three stages". Comte intended to develop a secular-scientific ideology in the wake of European secularisation.

Comte's stages were (1) the theological, (2) the metaphysical, and (3) the positive. The theological phase of man was based on whole-hearted belief in all things with reference to God. God, Comte says, had reigned supreme over human existence pre-Enlightenment. Humanity's place in society was governed by its association with the divine presences and with the church. The theological phase deals with humankind's accepting the doctrines of the church (or place of worship) rather than relying on its rational powers to explore basic questions about existence. It dealt with the restrictions put in place by the religious organization at the time and the total acceptance of any "fact" adduced for society to believe.

Comte describes the metaphysical phase of humanity as the time since the Enlightenment, a time steeped in logical rationalism, to the time right after the French Revolution. This second phase states that the universal rights of humanity are most important. The central idea is that humanity is invested with certain rights that must be respected. In this phase, democracies and dictators rose and fell in attempts to maintain the innate rights of humanity.

The final stage of the trilogy of Comte's universal law is the scientific, or positive, stage. The central idea of this phase is that individual rights are more important than the rule of any one person. Comte stated that the idea of humanity's ability to govern itself makes this stage inherently different from the rest. There is no higher power governing the masses and the intrigue of any one person can achieve anything based on that individual's free will. The third principle is most important in the positive stage. Comte calls these three phases the universal rule in relation to society and its development. Neither the second nor the third phase can be reached without the completion and understanding of the preceding stage. All stages must be completed in progress.

Comte believed that the appreciation of the past and the ability to build on it towards the future was key in transitioning from the theological and metaphysical phases. The idea of progress was central to Comte's new science, sociology. Sociology would "lead to the historical consideration of every science" because "the history of one science, including pure political history, would make no sense unless it was attached to the study of the general progress of all of humanity". As Comte would say: "from science comes prediction; from prediction comes action". It is a philosophy of human intellectual development that culminated in science. The irony of this series of phases is that though Comte attempted to prove that human development has to go through these three stages, it seems that the positivist stage is far from becoming a realization. This is due to two truths: The positivist phase requires having a complete understanding of the universe and world around us and requires that society should never know if it is in this positivist phase. Anthony Giddens argues that since humanity constantly uses science to discover and research new things, humanity never progresses beyond the second metaphysical phase.

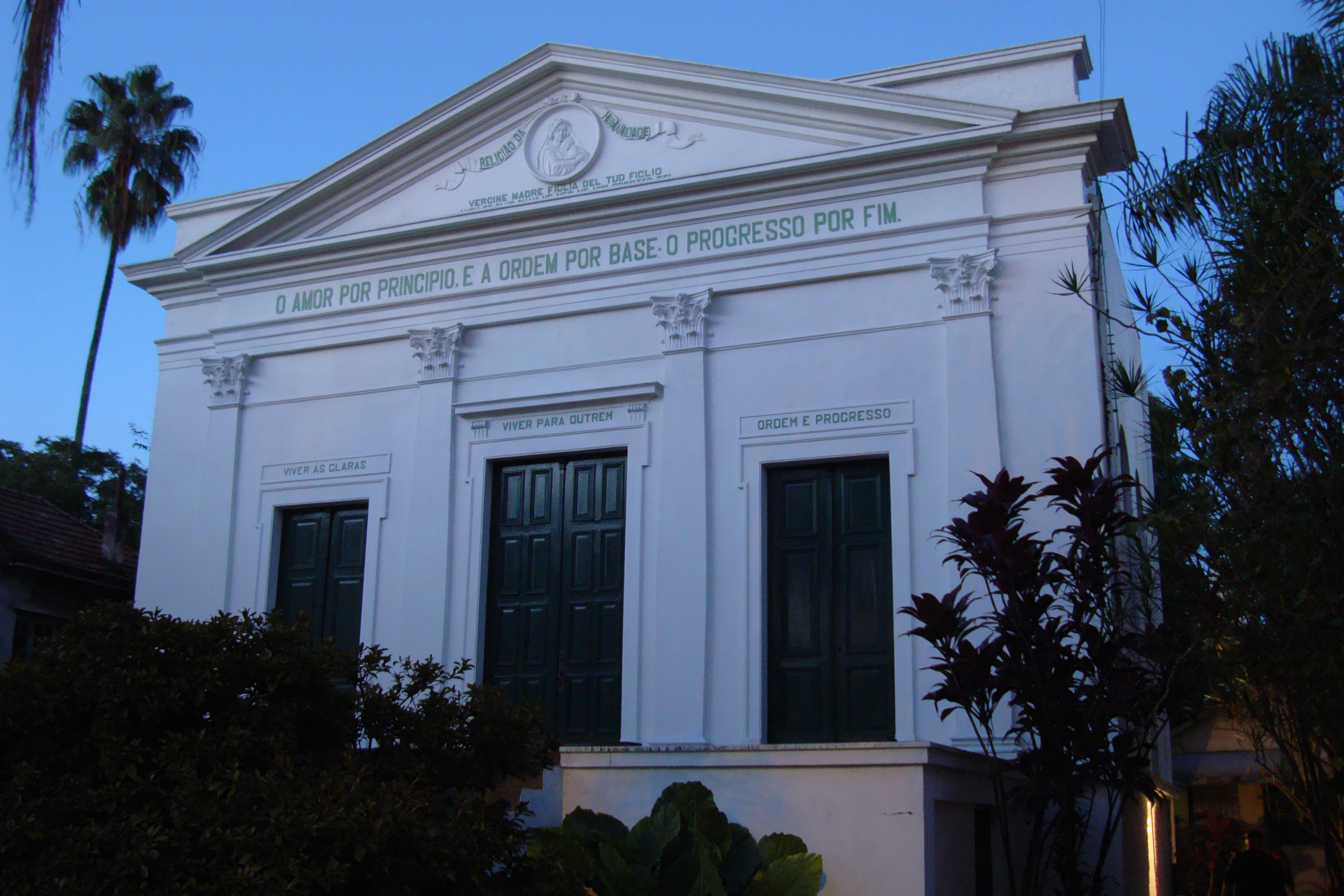
Positivist temple in Porto Alegre, Brazil

Comte's fame today owes in part to Emile Littré, who founded The Positivist Review in 1867. As an approach to the philosophy of history, positivism was appropriated by historians such as Hippolyte Taine. Many of Comte's writings were translated into English by the Whig writer, Harriet Martineau, regarded by some as the first female sociologist. Debates continue to rage as to how much Comte appropriated from the work of his mentor, Saint-Simon. He was nevertheless influential: Brazilian thinkers turned to Comte's ideas about training a scientific elite in order to flourish in the industrialization process. Brazil's national motto, Ordem e Progresso ("Order and Progress") was taken from the positivism motto, "Love as principle, order as the basis, progress as the goal", which was also influential in Poland.

In later life, Comte developed a 'religion of humanity' for positivist societies in order to fulfil the cohesive function once held by traditional worship. In 1849, he proposed a calendar reform called the 'positivist calendar'. For close associate John Stuart Mill, it was possible to distinguish between a "good Comte" (the author of the Course in Positive Philosophy) and a "bad Comte" (the author of the secular-religious system). The system was unsuccessful but met with the publication of Darwin's On the Origin of Species to influence the proliferation of various secular humanist organizations in the 19th century, especially through the work of secularists such as George Holyoake and Richard Congreve. Although Comte's English followers, including George Eliot and Harriet Martineau, for the most part rejected the full gloomy panoply of his system, they liked the idea of a religion of humanity and his injunction to "vivre pour autrui" ("live for others", from which comes the word "altruism").

The early sociology of Herbert Spencer came about broadly as a reaction to Comte; writing after various developments in evolutionary biology, Spencer attempted (in vain) to reformulate the discipline in what we might now describe as socially Darwinistic terms.

=== Early followers of Comte ===
Within a few years, other scientific and philosophical thinkers began creating their own definitions for positivism. These included Émile Zola, Emile Hennequin, Wilhelm Scherer, and Dimitri Pisarev. Fabien Magnin was the first working-class adherent to Comte's ideas, and became the leader of a movement known as "Proletarian Positivism". Comte appointed Magnin as his successor as president of the Positive Society in the event of Comte's death. Magnin filled this role from 1857 to 1880, when he resigned. Magnin was in touch with the English positivists Richard Congreve and Edward Spencer Beesly. He established the Cercle des prolétaires positivistes in 1863 which was affiliated to the First International. Eugène Sémérie was a psychiatrist who was also involved in the Positivist movement, setting up a positivist club in Paris after the foundation of the French Third Republic in 1870. He wrote: "Positivism is not only a philosophical doctrine, it is also a political party which claims to reconcile order—the necessary basis for all social activity—with Progress, which is its goal."

=== Durkheim's positivism ===
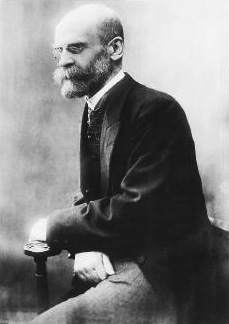
Émile Durkheim

The modern academic discipline of sociology began with the work of Émile Durkheim (1858–1917). While Durkheim rejected much of the details of Comte's philosophy, he retained and refined its method, maintaining that the social sciences are a logical continuation of the natural ones into the realm of human activity, and insisting that they may retain the same objectivity, rationalism, and approach to causality. Durkheim set up the first European department of sociology at the University of Bordeaux in 1895, publishing his Rules of the Sociological Method (1895). In this text he argued: "[o]ur main goal is to extend scientific rationalism to human conduct... What has been called our positivism is but a consequence of this rationalism."

Durkheim's seminal monograph, Suicide (1897), a case study of suicide rates amongst Catholic and Protestant populations, distinguished sociological analysis from psychology or philosophy. By carefully examining suicide statistics in different police districts, he attempted to demonstrate that Catholic communities have a lower suicide rate than Protestants, something he attributed to social (as opposed to individual or psychological) causes. He developed the notion of objective sui generis "social facts" to delineate a unique empirical object for the science of sociology to study. Through such studies, he posited, sociology would be able to determine whether a given society is 'healthy' or 'pathological', and seek social reform to negate organic breakdown or "social anomie". Durkheim described sociology as the "science of institutions, their genesis and their functioning".

David Ashley and David M. Orenstein have alleged, in a textbook published by Pearson Education, that accounts of Durkheim's positivism are possibly exaggerated and oversimplified; Comte was the only major sociological thinker to postulate that the social realm may be subject to scientific analysis in exactly the same way as natural science, whereas Durkheim saw a far greater need for a distinctly sociological scientific methodology. His lifework was fundamental in the establishment of practical social research as we know it today—techniques which continue beyond sociology and form the methodological basis of other social sciences, such as political science, as well of market research and other fields.

=== Historical positivism ===
In historiography, historical or documentary positivism is the belief that historians should pursue the objective truth of the past by allowing historical sources to "speak for themselves", without additional interpretation. In the words of the French historian Fustel de Coulanges, as a positivist, "It is not I who am speaking, but history itself". The heavy emphasis placed by historical positivists on documentary sources led to the development of methods of source criticism, which seek to expunge bias and uncover original sources in their pristine state.

The origin of the historical positivist school is particularly associated with the 19th-century German historian Leopold von Ranke, who argued that the historian should seek to describe historical truth "wie es eigentlich gewesen ist" ("as it actually was")—though subsequent historians of the concept, such as Georg Iggers, have argued that its development owed more to Ranke's followers than Ranke himself.

Historical positivism was critiqued in the 20th century by historians and philosophers of history from various schools of thought, including Ernst Kantorowicz in Weimar Germany—who argued that "positivism ... faces the danger of becoming Romantic when it maintains that it is possible to find the Blue Flower of truth without preconceptions"—and Raymond Aron and Michel Foucault in postwar France, who both posited that interpretations are always ultimately multiple and there is no final objective truth to recover. In his posthumously published 1946 The Idea of History, the English historian R. G. Collingwood criticized historical positivism for conflating scientific facts with historical facts, which are always inferred and cannot be confirmed by repetition, and argued that its focus on the "collection of facts" had given historians "unprecedented mastery over small-scale problems", but "unprecedented weakness in dealing with large-scale problems".

Historicist arguments against positivist approaches in historiography include that history differs from sciences like physics and ethology in subject matter and method; that much of what history studies is nonquantifiable, and therefore to quantify is to lose in precision; and that experimental methods and mathematical models do not generally apply to history, so that it is not possible to formulate general (quasi-absolute) laws in history.

=== Other subfields ===
In psychology the positivist movement was influential in the development of operationalism. The 1927 philosophy of science book The Logic of Modern Physics in particular, which was originally intended for physicists, coined the term operational definition, which went on to dominate psychological method for the whole century.

In economics, practicing researchers tend to emulate the methodological assumptions of classical positivism, but only in a de facto fashion: the majority of economists do not explicitly concern themselves with matters of epistemology. Economic thinker Friedrich Hayek (see "Law, Legislation and Liberty") rejected positivism in the social sciences as hopelessly limited in comparison to evolved and divided knowledge. For example, much (positivist) legislation falls short in contrast to pre-literate or incompletely defined common or evolved law.

In jurisprudence, "legal positivism" essentially refers to the rejection of natural law; thus its common meaning with philosophical positivism is somewhat attenuated and in recent generations generally emphasizes the authority of human political structures as opposed to a "scientific" view of law.

== Logical positivism ==
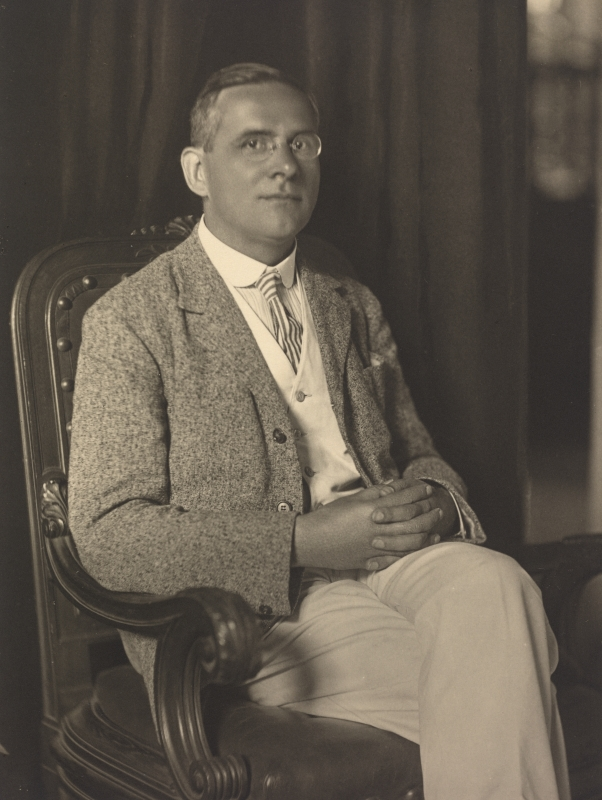
Moritz Schlick, the founding father of logical positivism and the Vienna Circle

Logical positivism (later and more accurately called logical empiricism) is a school of philosophy that combines empiricism, the idea that observational evidence is indispensable for knowledge of the world, with a version of rationalism, the idea that our knowledge includes a component that is not derived from observation.

Logical positivism grew from the discussions of a group called the "First Vienna Circle", which gathered at the Café Central before World War I. After the war Hans Hahn, a member of that early group, helped bring Moritz Schlick to Vienna. Schlick's Vienna Circle, along with Hans Reichenbach's Berlin Circle, propagated the new doctrines more widely in the 1920s and early 1930s.

It was Otto Neurath's advocacy that made the movement self-conscious and more widely known. A 1929 pamphlet written by Neurath, Hahn, and Rudolf Carnap summarized the doctrines of the Vienna Circle at that time. These included the opposition to all metaphysics, especially ontology and synthetic a priori propositions; the rejection of metaphysics not as wrong but as meaningless (i.e., not empirically verifiable); a criterion of meaning based on Ludwig Wittgenstein's early work (which he himself later set out to refute); the idea that all knowledge should be codifiable in a single standard language of science; and above all the project of "rational reconstruction," in which ordinary-language concepts were gradually to be replaced by more precise equivalents in that standard language. However, the project is widely considered to have failed.

After moving to the United States, Carnap proposed a replacement for the earlier doctrines in his Logical Syntax of Language. This change of direction, and the somewhat differing beliefs of Reichenbach and others, led to a consensus that the English name for the shared doctrinal platform, in its American exile from the late 1930s, should be "logical empiricism." While the logical positivist movement is now considered dead, it has continued to influence philosophical development.

== Criticism ==
Historically, positivism has been criticized for its reductionism, i.e., for contending that all "processes are reducible to physiological, physical or chemical events," "social processes are reducible to relationships between and actions of individuals," and that "biological organisms are reducible to physical systems."

The consideration that laws in physics may not be absolute but relative, and, if so, this might be even more true of social sciences, was stated, in different terms, by G. B. Vico in 1725. Vico, in contrast to the positivist movement, asserted the superiority of the science of the human mind (the humanities, in other words), on the grounds that natural sciences tell us nothing about the inward aspects of things.

Wilhelm Dilthey fought strenuously against the assumption that only explanations derived from science are valid. He reprised Vico's argument that scientific explanations do not reach the inner nature of phenomena and it is humanistic knowledge that gives us insight into thoughts, feelings and desires. Dilthey was in part influenced by the historism of Leopold von Ranke (1795–1886).

The contesting views over positivism are reflected both in older debates (see the Positivism dispute) and current ones over the proper role of science in the public sphere. Public sociology—especially as described by Michael Burawoy—argues that sociologists should use empirical evidence to display the problems of society so they might be changed.

=== Antipositivism ===
At the turn of the 20th century, the first wave of German sociologists formally introduced methodological antipositivism, proposing that research should concentrate on human cultural norms, values, symbols, and social processes viewed from a subjective perspective. Max Weber, one such thinker, argued that while sociology may be loosely described as a 'science' because it is able to identify causal relationships (especially among ideal types), sociologists should seek relationships that are not as "ahistorical, invariant, or generalizable" as those pursued by natural scientists. Weber regarded sociology as the study of social action, using critical analysis and verstehen techniques. The sociologists Georg Simmel, Ferdinand Tönnies, George Herbert Mead, and Charles Cooley were also influential in the development of sociological antipositivism, whilst neo-Kantian philosophy, hermeneutics, and phenomenology facilitated the movement in general.

=== Critical rationalism and postpositivism ===
In the mid-twentieth century, several important philosophers and philosophers of science began to critique the foundations of logical positivism. In his 1934 work The Logic of Scientific Discovery, Karl Popper argued against verificationism. A statement such as "all swans are white" cannot actually be empirically verified, because it is impossible to know empirically whether all swans have been observed. Instead, Popper argued that at best an observation can falsify a statement (for example, observing a black swan would prove that not all swans are white). Popper also held that scientific theories talk about how the world really is (not about phenomena or observations experienced by scientists), and critiqued the Vienna Circle in his Conjectures and Refutations. W. V. O. Quine and Pierre Duhem went even further. The Duhem–Quine thesis states that it is impossible to experimentally test a scientific hypothesis in isolation, because an empirical test of the hypothesis requires one or more background assumptions (also called auxiliary assumptions or auxiliary hypotheses); thus, unambiguous scientific falsifications are also impossible. Thomas Kuhn, in his 1962 book The Structure of Scientific Revolutions, put forward his theory of paradigm shifts. He argued that it is not simply individual theories but whole worldviews that must occasionally shift in response to evidence.

Together, these ideas led to the development of critical rationalism and postpositivism. Postpositivism is not a rejection of the scientific method, but rather a reformation of positivism to meet these critiques. It reintroduces the basic assumptions of positivism: the possibility and desirability of objective truth, and the use of experimental methodology. Postpositivism of this type is described in social science guides to research methods. Postpositivists argue that theories, hypotheses, background knowledge and values of the researcher can influence what is observed. Postpositivists pursue objectivity by recognizing the possible effects of biases. While positivists emphasize quantitative methods, postpositivists consider both quantitative and qualitative methods to be valid approaches.

In the early 1960s, the positivism dispute arose between the critical theorists (see below) and the critical rationalists over the correct solution to the value judgment dispute (Werturteilsstreit). While both sides accepted that sociology cannot avoid a value judgement that inevitably influences subsequent conclusions, the critical theorists accused the critical rationalists of being positivists; specifically, of asserting that empirical questions can be severed from their metaphysical heritage and refusing to ask questions that cannot be answered with scientific methods. This contributed to what Karl Popper termed the "Popper Legend", a misconception among critics and admirers of Popper that he was, or identified himself as, a positivist.

=== Critical theory ===
Although Karl Marx's theory of historical materialism drew upon positivism, the Marxist tradition would also go on to influence the development of antipositivist critical theory. Critical theorist Jürgen Habermas critiqued pure instrumental rationality (in its relation to the cultural "rationalisation" of the modern West) as a form of scientism, or science "as ideology". He argued that positivism may be espoused by "technocrats" who believe in the inevitability of social progress through science and technology. New movements, such as critical realism, have emerged in order to reconcile postpositivist aims with various so-called 'postmodern' perspectives on the social acquisition of knowledge.

Max Horkheimer criticized the classic formulation of positivism on two grounds. First, he claimed that it falsely represented human social action. The first criticism argued that positivism systematically failed to appreciate the extent to which the so-called social facts it yielded did not exist 'out there', in the objective world, but were themselves a product of socially and historically mediated human consciousness. Positivism ignored the role of the 'observer' in the constitution of social reality and thereby failed to consider the historical and social conditions affecting the representation of social ideas. Positivism falsely represented the object of study by reifying social reality as existing objectively and independently of the labour that actually produced those conditions. Secondly, he argued, representation of social reality produced by positivism was inherently and artificially conservative, helping to support the status quo, rather than challenging it. This character may also explain the popularity of positivism in certain political circles. Horkheimer argued, in contrast, that critical theory possessed a reflexive element lacking in the positivistic traditional theory.

Some scholars today hold the beliefs critiqued in Horkheimer's work, but since the time of his writing critiques of positivism, especially from philosophy of science, have led to the development of postpositivism. This philosophy greatly relaxes the epistemological commitments of logical positivism and no longer claims a separation between the knower and the known. Rather than dismissing the scientific project outright, postpositivists seek to transform and amend it, though the exact extent of their affinity for science varies vastly. For example, some postpositivists accept the critique that observation is always value-laden, but argue that the best values to adopt for sociological observation are those of science: skepticism, rigor, and modesty. Just as some critical theorists see their position as a moral commitment to egalitarian values, these postpositivists see their methods as driven by a moral commitment to these scientific values. Such scholars may see themselves as either positivists or antipositivists.

=== Other criticisms ===
During the later twentieth century, positivism began to fall out of favor with scientists as well. Later in his career, German theoretical physicist Werner Heisenberg, Nobel laureate for his pioneering work in quantum mechanics, distanced himself from positivism:

The positivists have a simple solution: the world must be divided into that which we can say clearly and the rest, which we had better pass over in silence. But can any one conceive of a more pointless philosophy, seeing that what we can say clearly amounts to next to nothing? If we omitted all that is unclear we would probably be left with completely uninteresting and trivial tautologies.

In the early 1970s, urbanists of the quantitative school like David Harvey started to question the positivist approach itself, saying that the arsenal of scientific theories and methods developed so far in their camp were "incapable of saying anything of depth and profundity" on the real problems of contemporary cities.

According to the Catholic Encyclopedia, Positivism has also come under fire on religious and philosophical grounds, whose proponents state that truth begins in sense experience, but does not end there. Positivism fails to prove that there are not abstract ideas, laws, and principles, beyond particular observable facts and relationships and necessary principles, or that we cannot know them. Nor does it prove that material and corporeal things constitute the whole order of existing beings, and that our knowledge is limited to them. According to positivism, our abstract concepts or general ideas are mere collective representations of the experimental order—for example; the idea of "man" is a kind of blended image of all the men observed in our experience. This runs contrary to a Platonic or Christian ideal, where an idea can be abstracted from any concrete determination, and may be applied identically to an indefinite number of objects of the same class. From the idea's perspective, Platonism is more precise. Defining an idea as a sum of collective images is imprecise and more or less confused, and becomes more so as the collection represented increases. An idea defined explicitly always remains clear.

Other new movements, such as critical realism, have emerged in opposition to positivism. Critical realism seeks to reconcile the overarching aims of social science with postmodern critiques. Experientialism, which arose with second generation cognitive science, asserts that knowledge begins and ends with experience itself. In other words, it rejects the positivist assertion that a portion of human knowledge is a priori.

== Positivism today ==
Echoes of the "positivist" and "antipositivist" debate persist today, though this conflict is hard to define. Authors writing in different epistemological perspectives do not phrase their disagreements in the same terms and rarely actually speak directly to each other. To complicate the issues further, few practising scholars explicitly state their epistemological commitments, and their epistemological position thus has to be guessed from other sources such as choice of methodology or theory. However, no perfect correspondence between these categories exists, and many scholars critiqued as "positivists" are actually postpositivists. One scholar has described this debate in terms of the social construction of the "other", with each side defining the other by what it is not rather than what it is, and then proceeding to attribute far greater homogeneity to their opponents than actually exists. Thus, it is better to understand this not as a debate but as two different arguments: the "antipositivist" articulation of a social meta-theory which includes a philosophical critique of scientism, and "positivist" development of a scientific research methodology for sociology with accompanying critiques of the reliability and validity of work that they see as violating such standards. Strategic positivism aims to bridge these two arguments.

=== Social sciences ===
While most social scientists today are not explicit about their epistemological commitments, articles in top American sociology and political science journals generally follow a positivist logic of argument. It can be thus argued that "natural science and social science [research articles] can therefore be regarded with a good deal of confidence as members of the same genre".

In contemporary social science, strong accounts of positivism have long since fallen out of favour. Practitioners of positivism today acknowledge in far greater detail observer bias and structural limitations. Modern positivists generally eschew metaphysical concerns in favour of methodological debates concerning clarity, replicability, reliability and validity. This positivism is generally equated with "quantitative research" and thus carries no explicit theoretical or philosophical commitments. The institutionalization of this kind of sociology is often credited to Paul Lazarsfeld, who pioneered large-scale survey studies and developed statistical techniques for analyzing them. This approach lends itself to what Robert K. Merton called middle-range theory: abstract statements that generalize from segregated hypotheses and empirical regularities rather than starting with an abstract idea of a social whole.

In the original Comtean usage, the term "positivism" roughly meant the use of scientific methods to uncover the laws according to which both physical and human events occur, while "sociology" was the overarching science that would synthesize all such knowledge for the betterment of society. "Positivism is a way of understanding based on science"; people don't rely on the faith in God but instead on the science behind humanity. "Antipositivism" formally dates back to the start of the twentieth century, and is based on the belief that natural and human sciences are ontologically and epistemologically distinct. Neither of these terms is used any longer in this sense. There are no fewer than twelve distinct epistemologies that are referred to as positivism. Many of these approaches do not self-identify as "positivist", some because they themselves arose in opposition to older forms of positivism, and some because the label has over time become a term of abuse by being mistakenly linked with a theoretical empiricism. The extent of antipositivist criticism has also become broad, with many philosophies broadly rejecting the scientifically based social epistemology and other ones only seeking to amend it to reflect 20th century developments in the philosophy of science. However, positivism (understood as the use of scientific methods for studying society) remains the dominant approach to both the research and the theory construction in contemporary sociology, especially in the United States.

The majority of articles published in leading American sociology and political science journals today are positivist (at least to the extent of being quantitative rather than qualitative). This popularity may be because research utilizing positivist quantitative methodologies holds a greater prestige in the social sciences than qualitative work; quantitative work is easier to justify, as data can be manipulated to answer any question. Such research is generally perceived as being more scientific and more trustworthy, and thus has a greater impact on policy and public opinion (though such judgments are frequently contested by scholars doing non-positivist work).

=== Natural sciences ===
The key features of positivism as of the 1950s, as defined in the "received view", are:

1. A focus on science as a product, a linguistic or numerical set of statements;
2. A concern with axiomatization, that is, with demonstrating the logical structure and coherence of these statements;
3. An insistence on at least some of these statements being testable; that is, amenable to being verified, confirmed, or shown to be false by the empirical observation of reality. Statements that would, by their nature, be regarded as untestable included the teleological; thus positivism rejects much of classical metaphysics.
4. The belief that science is markedly cumulative;
5. The belief that science is predominantly transcultural;
6. The belief that science rests on specific results that are dissociated from the personality and social position of the investigator;
7. The belief that science contains theories or research traditions that are largely commensurable;
8. The belief that science sometimes incorporates new ideas that are discontinuous from old ones;
9. The belief that science involves the idea of the unity of science, that there is, underlying the various scientific disciplines, basically one science about one real world.
10. The belief that science is nature and nature is science; and out of this duality, all theories and postulates are created, interpreted, evolve, and are applied.

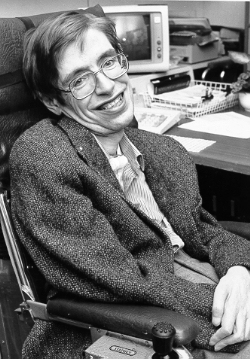
Stephen Hawking

Stephen Hawking was a recent high-profile advocate of positivism in the physical sciences. In The Universe in a Nutshell (p. 31) he wrote:

Any sound scientific theory, whether of time or of any other concept, should in my opinion be based on the most workable philosophy of science: the positivist approach put forward by Karl Popper and others. According to this way of thinking, a scientific theory is a mathematical model that describes and codifies the observations we make. A good theory will describe a large range of phenomena on the basis of a few simple postulates and will make definite predictions that can be tested. ... If one takes the positivist position, as I do, one cannot say what time actually is. All one can do is describe what has been found to be a very good mathematical model for time and say what predictions it makes.

== See also ==
- Cliodynamics
- Científico
- Charvaka
- Determinism
- Gödel's incompleteness theorems
- London Positivist Society
- Nature versus nurture
- Physics envy
- Scientific politics
- Sociological naturalism
- The New Paul and Virginia
- Vladimir Solovyov
