= London Positivist Society =

Former political circle based in London

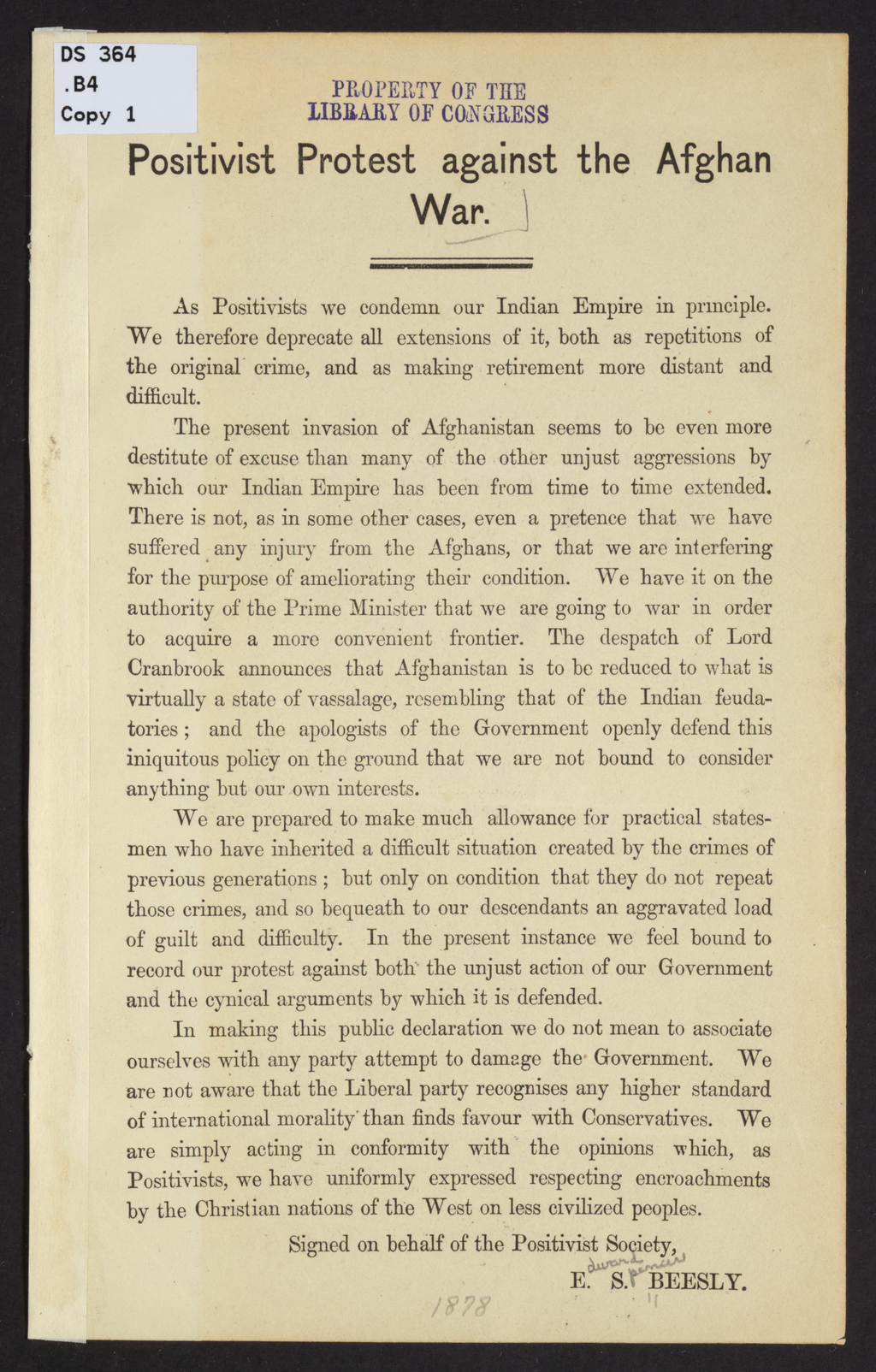
Positivist Protest against the Afghan War 1878

The London Positivist Society was an atheistic philosophical, humanist, and political circle that met in London, England, between May 1867 and 1974. The conditions of membership originally included "emancipation from theology and metaphysics and the acceptance of Comte's views on science and society". The Society's members occupied themselves in applying the ideas of the philosophical school of Comtean positivism to current affairs of the day, including the movement for home rule in Ireland, the Second Boer War (which the Society opposed), the strikes of London trade unionists (which the society defended), Egyptian Independence (which the society supported), the Indian independence movement (which the Society supported) and defence of the Paris Commune. Among their writings was the 1896 pamphlet Positivist Comments on Public Affairs. The Society also supported the founding of the Sociological Society of London. In 1934, it was renamed the English Positivist Committee.

== History ==
The society was founded by Richard Congreve (1818–1899) in 1867 as a philosophical and political body. By 1870, the group under Congreve was based at Chapel Street Hall in London. The barrister Frederic Harrison, who had met Congreve at Wadham College, Oxford, was a founding member, but he found it difficult to adhere to Congreve's rigid Comtism. In 1878 the group suffered a schism. That summer, Congreve dissolved the Society, for he wished to make sure everyone involved in the group advocated Auguste Comte's Religion of Humanity. He had founded the 'Church of Humanity' in January 1859 and was dissatisfied with the reluctance of the society to support his cause. In 1878, the Society's members published a range of attacks on one another, including Congreve's Circular Addressed to all my Coreligionists, to all the Disciples of Auguste Comte; E.S. Beesly's Remarks on Dr Congreve's Circular; and John Henry Bridges' Appeal to English Positivists. Beesly, Bridges, Harrison, and Vernon Lushington, among others, carried on as the London Positivist Society, expanding the group's membership to 93 members by 1891. In 1881, London Positivist Society boasted a new home at Fleur-de-lis Court, off Fetter Lane, Fleet Street, London. It was called Newton Hall after Sir Isaac Newton, who had first acquired it for the Royal Society Museum. Newton Hall became a popular Positivist center distinct from Congreve's Chapel Street Hall 'Church of Humanity' for the years to come. In 1883, the Newton Hall group formed a choir for positivist ceremonies, and they appointed Henry Holmes to compose a cantata of George Eliot's poem, 'The Choir Invisible' for these purposes.

Those who were elected members included, at one time or another, the barrister Frederic Harrison; the historian E. S. Beesly; the physicians Evan Buchanan Baxter and John Henry Bridges. Others affiliated to the group in some way included the sociologists Charles Booth, Patrick Geddes, Victor Branford, and Sybella Gurney; Henry Tompkins (1870–1954); Donald Fincham (1916–1969); George Henry Lewes (1817–1878); Frederick William Walsh (1879–1923), who had been paralysed in an industrial accident but whose mind remained sharp; Paul Juste Decours; and Benjamin Fossett Lock (honorary secretary of the Society 1880–1886), who resigned in 1886 over the Irish home rule debate.

In 1934 the London Positivist Society merged with the English Positivist Committee, taking the latter's name.

The Society's presidents included

- Edward Spencer Beesly
- Shapland Hugh Swinny (1857–1923), Society president 1901–1923; Swinny was a personal friend of several Indian nationalists, including Bal Gangadhar Tilak.

In 1878, the organization published a manifesto protesting the Second Anglo-Afghan War. Edward Spenser Beesly signed the manifesto, which was one page long, and believed that attacking the Afghans was unjust.

== Sources ==
- Beesly, E.S. 1878. Remarks on Dr Congreve's Circular. London: N.A.
- Bridges, J.H. 1878. Appeal to English Positivists. London: N.A.
- Catalogue of the papers of the London Positivist Society at the Archives Division of the London School of Economics.
- Dixon, Thomas. 2008. The Invention of Altruism. Oxford: Oxford University Press.
- Forbes, Geraldine. 1975. Positivism in Bengal. Calcutta: Minerva.
- Forbes, Geraldine. 2018. "Striking a Chord: The Reception of Comte's Positivism in Colonial India." In The Worlds of Positivism, edited by Johannes Feichtinger, Franz L. Fillafer and Jan Surman, 31–52. London: Palgrave Macmillan.
- Forbes, Geraldine Handcock. 2003. "The English Positivists and India." In Essays on Indian Renaissance, edited by Raj Kumar, 151–63. New Delhi: Discovery.
- Harrison, Royden. 1959. "E.S. Beesly and Karl Marx, I–III." International Review of Social History 4 (1):22–58.
- Harrison, Royden. 1965. Before the Socialists. London: Routledge.
- Harrison, Royden. 1967. "Professor Beesly and the Working-class Movement." In Essays in Labour History, edited by Asa Briggs and John Saville, 205–41. New York: Palgrave Macmillan.
- Harrison, Royden, ed. 1971. The English Defence of the Commune, 1871. London: Merlin.
- Liveing, Susan. 1926. A Nineteenth-Century Teacher: John Henry Bridges. London: Paul.
- London Positivist Society / English Positivist Committee
- McGee, John Edwin. 1931. A Crusade for Humanity: the History of Organized Positivism in England. London: Watts.
- A detailed biography of Swinny and Victorian positivist history Nationalism and anti-theology in Ireland at the start of the twentieth century
- Vogeler, Martha S. 1978. "Frederic Harrison and the Religion of Humanity." The Ethical Record 83 (10):3–6. Vogeler, Martha S. 1984. Frederic Harrison: the Vocations of a Positivist. Oxford: Clarendon. Wright, T.R. 1986. The Religion of Humanity: the Impact of Comtean Positivism on Victorian Britain. Cambridge: Cambridge University Press.
