= Shapland Hugh Swinny =

- Born: 30 December 1857; Dublin, Ireland
- Died: 31 August 1923; London
- Occupation: Economist

Shapland Hugh Swinny (30 January 1857, Dublin – 31 August 1923, London) was an Irish economist and Comtean positivist.

Shapland Hugh Swinny was born in Dublin in 1857, the son of Captain Shapland Swiny. He was educated at St John's College, Cambridge, graduating B.A. in 1880 and M.A. in 1884.

He joined the London Positivist Society immediately after graduating from Cambridge and succeeded Edward Spencer Beesly as President of the London Positivist Society (1901–1923). He also was editor of the Positivist Review .

He was the Chairman of the Council of the Sociological Society from 1907 to 1909.

He was a co-founder of the Church of Humanity, together with Philip Thomas.

Swinny was a personal friend of several Indian nationalists, including Bal Gangadhar Tilak.

Shapland Hugh Swinny died in 1923.

== Works ==
- 1890 – The history of Ireland: Three lectures, given in Newton Hall -, London 1890
- Edward Spencer Beesly & Shapland Hugh Swinny – The Positivist Review, Volumes 13–14 -, BiblioBazaar, 2010, ISBN 978-1-149-10708-9
- Frederic Harrison & Shapland Hugh Swinny & Francis Sydney Marvin – The New Calendar of Great Men: Biographies of the 559 Worthies of All Ages And Nations in the Positivist Calendar of Auguste Comte
