= Charles-François-Maximilien Marie =

French mathematician (1819–1891)

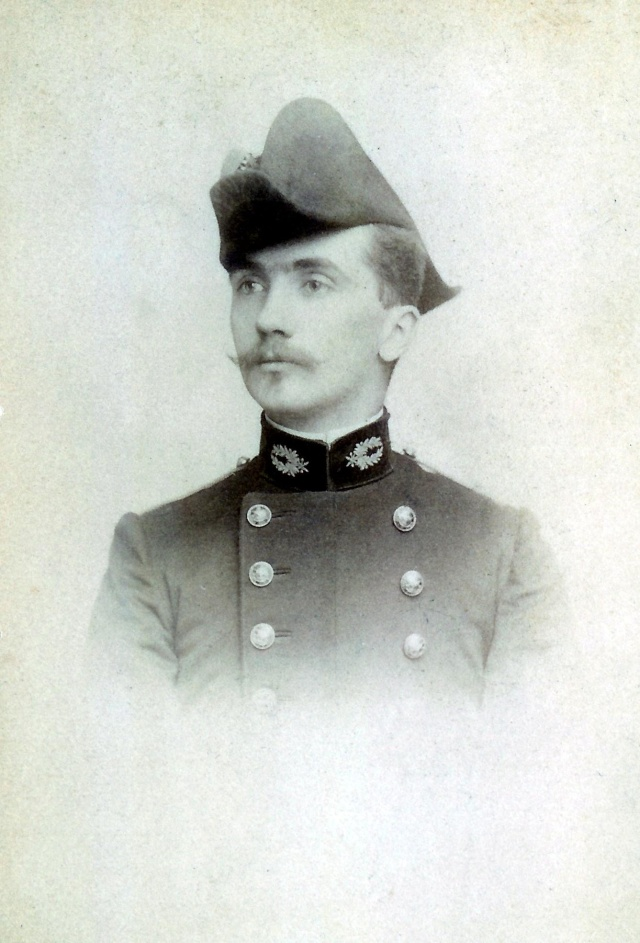
- Born: 1 January 1819; Paris, France
- Died: 27 April 1891 (aged 72); Boulevard Saint-Germain, Paris, France
- Citizenship: French
- Education: École Polytechnique
- Known for: History of the Mathematics
- Scientific career
- Fields: Mathematics
- Doctoral advisor: Auguste Comte

Charles-François-Maximilien Marie (1819–1891) was a French mathematician, historian of mathematics. He was the author of History of the Mathematics and Theory of the variable imaginary functions (1874), relating to the imaginary unit.

== Biography ==
Maximilien Marie was born in Paris on 1 January 1819. He was the son of Simon Marie (1775–1855) an infantry captain in Napoleon's Grande Armée from a modest background, and Henriette Josephine de Ficquelmont (1780–1843), poor, but from the nobility of Lorraine.

The financial situation of his father, retired Captain Marie, was dire for a household with a wife and three children: Clotilde (born in 1815), Maximilian (born in 1819) and Leon (born in 1820) therefore, his father was given an office of tax collector in Méru in Oise To help him.

Maximilian spent his childhood in Méru with his older sister Mary and his younger brother Leon.

He graduated from the École Polytechnique in 1838 and went on to attend the École d'application de l'artillerie et du génie in Metz as an officer student in artillery. While an officer in training in Metz, he discovered a key element of solid mechanics as he found out how solid matters are moving.

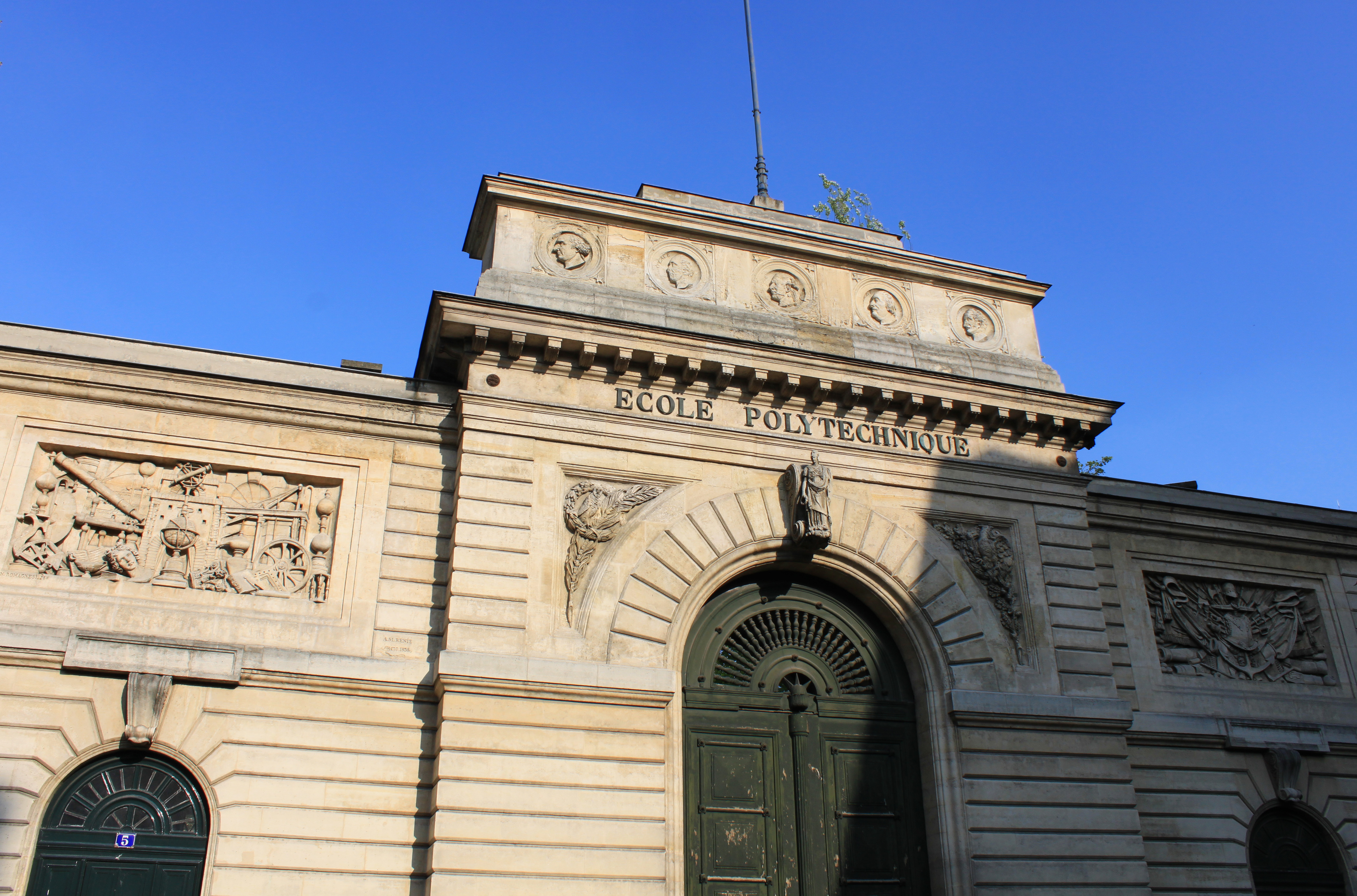
Ecole Polytechnique's historic entrance

In 1841, he was made a lieutenant-major, but, more attracted by the field of mathematics, he chose to resign from the army and move back to Paris. Close to the positivist movements, Ficquelmont began to spend time with his former professor philosopher Auguste Comte, who soon became his mentor. In 1844, Maximilien Marie introduced him to his sister Clotilde de Vaux. Comte fell passionately in love with her, a feeling that she did not reciprocate, and the one-sided affair ended when Clotilde suddenly died of tuberculosis a year later. Following Clotilde's death in 1846, Maximilien Marie and Comte grow apart while Comte dedicated himself to reorganising his previous philosophical system into a new positivist secular religion inspired by Clotilde's moral values: the Positivist Church or Religion of Humanity.

In 1862, backed by the famous mathematicians Joseph Liouville and General Jean-Victor Poncelet, Maximilien Marie was appointed professor of Mechanics at the École Polytechnique. In 1875, he was appointed head of admissions . Besides his academic achievements at the Polytechnique, he wrote the book Théorie des fonctions de variables imaginaires relating to the Imaginary unit.

Growing old, he entered politics during the Third Republic and became mayor of Châtillon. In 1890, he retired from the Polytechnique and died a year later.

== Honors ==
Maximilien Marie was made chevalier (1876) and officer (12 juillet 1880), of the Légion d’honneur.

== Works ==
He published a 12-volume encyclopedia, History of the Mathematics, which was divided into two parts: Théorie des fonctions de variables imaginaires (tomes I à III, Gauthier-Villars, 1874–1876, 3 vol.) and Histoire des sciences mathématiques et physiques (tomes I à XII, Gauthier-Villars, 1883–1888, 12 vol.)

== Family ==
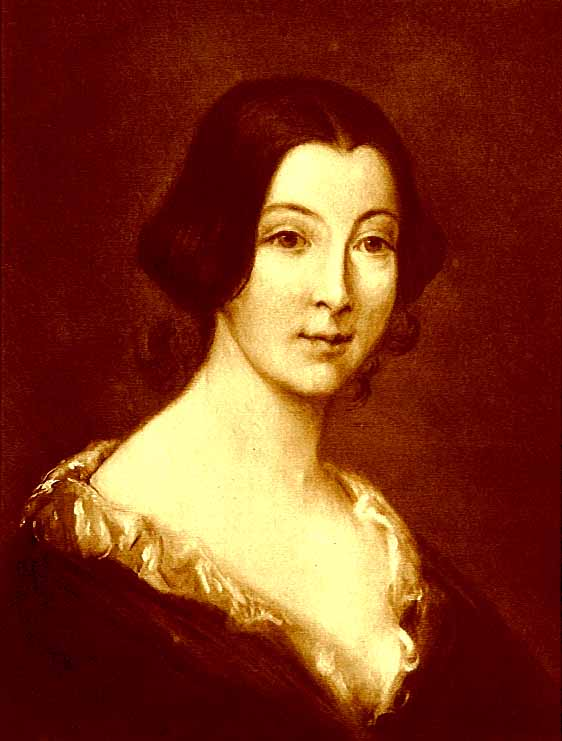
Maximilien's sister, Clotilde de Vaux

He had one elder sister, the famous positivist muse Clotilde de Vaux, and one younger brother, Léonard Marie (1820–1860), chevalier of the Légion d'honneur, who was also a military officer trained at the École Polytechnique and who died without issue at the Battle of Palikao.

On 20 January 1844, at twenty-five years old, he married in Macon (Saône-et-Loire), Felicity Philiberte Aniel, who was just fifteen years old, with whom he had a son, Charles-Paul-Augustin-Maximilien-Léon(1845–1886), chevalier of the Légion d'honneur, who graduated from the École Polytechnique to become a French military officer and died during the Franco-Chinese War.

== Bibliography ==
- Charles de Rouvre, L'amoureuse histoire d'Auguste comte et de Clotilde de Vaux, Calmann-Lévy, 1920.
