= Charles John Crompton =

English judge

- Born: 12 June 1797; Derby
- Died: 30 October 1865 (aged 68)
- Spouse: Caroline Fletcher (m. 1832)
- Children: Charles Crompton (1833–1890); Mary Crompton (1834–1873); Henry Crompton (1836–1904); Caroline Anna Croom Robertson (1838–1892); Emily Crompton (1840–1899); Albert Crompton (1844–1908); Edward Crompton (1845–1915)
- Parent(s): Peter Crompton; Mary Crompton

Sir Charles John Crompton (12 June 1797 – 30 October 1865) was an English justice of the Queen's Bench.

== Life ==
Crompton was born in Derby; he was the third son of Dr. Peter Crompton, and his second cousin Mary, daughter of John Crompton of Chorley Hall, Lancashire. Peter was a member of the Derby Philosophical Society and his father was a banker there.

Crompton, having graduated with distinction at Trinity College, Dublin, was entered at the Inner Temple in 1817, after a short time spent in a Liverpool solicitor's office and, being called to the bar in 1821, went the northern circuit.

Without having taken silk, he was raised to the bench in February 1852 by Lord Truro, and knighted. He proved an excellent judge, especially in banco, and was the author of many decisions still quoted.

A strong Liberal in politics, like his father, he stood for parliament at Preston in 1832, and Newport (Isle of Wight) in 1847, but in both cases unsuccessfully.

== Family ==
He married Caroline Fletcher, fourth daughter of Thomas Fletcher, a Liverpool merchant, in 1832, and left four sons and three daughters:

- Charles Crompton MA QC MP (1833–1890), married Florence Elizabeth Gaskell, daughter of Elizabeth Gaskell.
- Mary Crompton (1834–1873), married Rev John Llewellyn Davies MA DD (1826–1918), among their children were

- Charles Llewelyn Davies MA CBE (1860–1927)
- Margaret Caroline Llewelyn Davies (1861–1944), general secretary of the Co-operative Women's Guild from 1899 until 1921.
- Arthur Llewelyn Davies (1863–1907) who married Sylvia du Maurier, their sons, the Llewelyn Davies boys, inspired the story of Peter Pan.
- Maurice Llewelyn Davies (1864–1939) who married Mary Eulelia Roberts (1863–1902)
- Harry Llewelyn Davies (1866–1923) who married Agnes Ralston McIndoe (1877–1963)
- Crompton Llewelyn Davies MA (1868–1935) who married Mary Elizabeth 'Moya' O'Connor (1881–1943), daughter of James O'Connor and an associate of Michael Collins.

- Professor Richard Llewelyn-Davies, Baron Llewelyn-Davies (1912–1981) who married Annie Patricia Parry, Baroness Llewelyn-Davies (1915–1997)

- Theodore Llewelyn Davies MA (1870–1905)

- Henry Crompton (1836–1904) who married Lucy Henrietta Romilly (1848–1923), the daughter of John Romilly, 1st Baron Romilly and Caroline Charlotte Otter (1809–1855)

- Paul Crompton (1871–1915), director of The Booths Steam Ship Company, who married Gladys Mary Salis-Schwabe (1878–1915), the daughter of George Salis-Schwabe. Paul, Gladys, their six children and governess all drowned in the Sinking of the RMS Lusitania
- David Henry Crompton (1873–1946) who married Lillian MacDonald Sheridan (1888–1970), and left three daughters and a son:

- Bontë Romilly Crompton (1914–2002) who married Lt Col Gustavo Durán Martínez (1906–1969), their three daughters are Cheli Durán Ryan, an author; Lucy Durán, ethnomusicologist; and Jane Duran, poet.
- Catherine MacDonald 'Bobs' Crompton (1816–1978) who married Henry David L G Walston JP CVO Baron Walston (1912–1991). Catherine was the mistress of Graham Greene.
- David Crompton (1918–?)
- Dr Belinda Booth Crompton (1920– ), a child psychiatrist, who married Michael Whitney Straight (1916–2004), they divorced in 1969.

- Rosamund May Sale (1882–1997) who married Jean Auguste Yves Tinayre (1891–1972), known as Yves Tinayre, a noted baritone singer and the son of the French artist and film-maker Louis Tinayre.

- Caroline Anna Crompton (1838–1892) who married Professor George Croom Robertson
- Emily Crompton (1840–1899) who married Professor Edward Spencer Beesly (1931–1915), and left four sons

- Gerald Beesly (1871–1953) who married Helen Chamberlain (1872–1922), a grand-daughter of Joseph Chamberlain

- Helen Beesly (1905– )
- Richard Beesly (1907–1965)
- Marian Beesly (1909– )
- Patrick Beesly (1913–1986)

- Oliver Beesly (1872–?)
- Alfred Beesly (1873–1960)
- Dr Lewis Beesly FRCS (1877–?), co-author of 'A Manual of Surgical Anatomy'

- Albert Crompton (1844–1908), manager of the Ocean Steam Ship Company, who married Elinor Elizabeth Aikin (1849–1885), granddaughter of Charles Rochemont Aikin
- Edward Crompton (1845–1915) who married Agnes Mary Berry (1846–1900), and left a son and three daughters.
