= Caroline Croom Robertson =

British suffragist and college administrator (1838–1892)

- Born: 1838; Liverpool
- Died: 29 May 1892 (aged 53–54); Kensington Park Gardens
- Occupation: National Society for Women's Suffrage
- Known for: secretary and later bursar of Girton College, Cambridge
- Spouse: Prof. George Croom Robertson

Caroline Anna Croom Robertson, born Caroline Anna Crompton (1838 – 29 May 1892) was a British suffragist and college administrator. She was the secretary and later bursar of Girton College, Cambridge - the first university college in England to admit women.

== Life ==
Robertson was born in Liverpool in 1838 as the fourth daughter of Justice Charles Crompton. She was named Caroline after her mother. Her large family included Mary who married the theologian John Llewelyn Davies, a member of the family of the women's education activist Emily Davies and the positivist Henry Crompton.

In 1872 she married George Croom Robertson who became her husband and partner. He was the Grote professor of mind and logic at University College, London. He was a collaborator with Alexander Bain and their friend John Stuart Mill. They were both involved in social work and they were members of the National Society for Women's Suffrage. Her mother had been active in working for improving the provision of education for women and this was a cause which she shared. She and her husband supported this cause in arguing that women should be students on courses at University College.

She understood money and finance so she applied for the position of secretary of Girton College when it was created in 1877. Girton was the first university college in England to admit women. The job was to assist Emily Davies who had co-founded the college. She became invaluable in this role so that when she tried to resign in 1881, she was encouraged to stay on as bursar. She had wanted to resign because of her health so the new role of bursar was created just for her. She was paid £70 p.a. and in exchange she was placed in charge of most of the finances and the college seal. This degree of responsibility was usually only given to men at that time.

Robertson died in Kensington Park Gardens in London in 1892. One thousand pounds was left to the New Hospital for Women to create the "Caroline Croom Robertson" bed. She was buried in the same churchyard as her father and later that year her husband joined her.
