= Henry Crompton =

English court clerk and barrister

- Born: 27 August 1836; Liverpool
- Died: March 15, 1904 (aged 67)
- Spouse: Lucy Henrietta Romilly (m. 1870)
- Children: 2
- Parent(s): Charles John Crompton; Caroline Fletcher

Henry Crompton (27 August 1836 – 15 March 1904) was an English court clerk and barrister, known as an advocate of positivism and trade unions.

== Life ==
Born in Liverpool on 27 August 1836, he was the second of five sons of Charles John Crompton and his wife Caroline Fletcher; the eldest son was Charles Crompton (1833–1890). Educated at University College school, London, at a private school in Bonn, and at Trinity College, Cambridge, where he graduated B.A. in 1858, he went on to study medicine at St Mary's Hospital, Paddington.

In 1858 Crompton was appointed clerk of assize on the Chester and North Wales circuit, a post which he held for 43 years. He was called to the bar at the Inner Temple on 6 June 1863. He died on 15 March 1904 at Churt near Farnham, Surrey, and is buried there.

== Works ==
=== Positivism ===
During a long illness (1858–9), Crompton read Auguste Comte's Philosophie Positive in Harriet Martineau's edition, and became a positivist. He met Edward Spencer Beesly in 1864, and took an active part in the positivist movement. In his later life he was chief assistant to Richard Congreve at the Church of Humanity, Chapel Street, becoming its leader after Congreve's death in 1899. There he gave addresses on religion, philosophy, history, and public affairs: some were published as pamphlets.

=== Other works ===
- Industrial Conciliation (1876). Crompton was at the time referee to the board of arbitration and conciliation for the Nottingham lace trade. Beatrice and Sidney Webb called it "the classic work" on the subject (Industrial Democracy, p. 223, note). It was translated into French.
- Letters on Social and Political Subjects (1870), reprinted from the Sheffield Independent.
- Our Criminal Justice (1905), edited papers, with an introduction by Kenelm Edward Digby, on the English system of criminal procedure.
- Selections of Prose and Poetry by Henry Crompton (1910), issued by his widow.

== Interests ==
Crompton applied his principles to public questions, protested against international injustice, and opposed racial oppression of other races. He served on the Jamaica Committee, formed to prosecute Governor Edward Eyre in 1867; worked for the admission of women to lectures at University College, London; strove for the improvement and just administration of the criminal law; and gave a strenuous and support to the trade unions in their struggle to reform the labour laws. When bills affecting trade unions were before parliament, he advised based on his technical knowledge in the area. In recognition of his services he was made in 1868 a member of the Amalgamated Society of Carpenters and Joiners.

== Family ==
Crompton married on 8 November 1870 Lucy Henrietta, daughter of John Romilly, 1st Baron Romilly. They had two sons.
