= John Henry Bridges =

English physician, public health administrator and positivist (1832–1906)

- Born: 1832; Old Newton, Suffolk, England
- Died: 15 June 1906 (aged 73–74); Tunbridge Wells, Kent, England
- Education: Wadham College, Oxford
- Occupations: Physician, medical inspector, writer and translator
- Known for: Leadership of English positivism; translations of Auguste Comte; edition of Roger Bacon's Opus Majus
- Spouse: Mary Alice Hadwen (m. 1869)
- Father: Charles Bridges

John Henry Bridges FRCP (1832 – 15 June 1906) was an English physician, public-health administrator, writer and translator, and one of the leaders of the positivist movement in England. With his lifelong friends Frederic Harrison and Edward Spencer Beesly, and their senior Richard Congreve, he formed the inner circle of the English followers of Auguste Comte, whose General View of Positivism he translated in 1865. For more than twenty years he served as a metropolitan medical inspector to the Local Government Board, and in 1892 he delivered the Harveian Oration at the Royal College of Physicians.

== Early life and education ==
Bridges was born in 1832 at Old Newton, Suffolk, the second son of the Reverend Charles Bridges, an evangelical clergyman and devotional writer. He was educated at Rugby School under Archibald Campbell Tait and at Wadham College, Oxford, where his contemporaries included Frederic Harrison and Edward Spencer Beesly; under the influence of their tutor Richard Congreve, the Wadham group became the nucleus of English positivism. Bridges was elected to a fellowship at Oriel College, Oxford, and then took up the study of medicine.

== Medical and public health career ==
After qualifying in medicine, Bridges emigrated briefly to Melbourne, but returned to England following the death of his first wife and settled in practice in Bradford, where he was appointed physician to the Bradford Infirmary in 1861. He was elected a Fellow of the Royal College of Physicians in 1867. In 1869 he became a factory inspector for the North Riding of Yorkshire, and in 1870 he moved to London on his appointment as a metropolitan medical inspector to the Local Government Board, an office he held until 1892; he afterwards served as a manager of the Metropolitan Asylums Board. In 1892 he delivered the Harveian Oration at the Royal College of Physicians, published as Harvey and his Successors.

== Positivism and writings ==
Bridges was best known in his lifetime as a man of letters and as one of the ablest of the English positivists. His translation of Comte's A General View of Positivism appeared in 1865, and he subsequently collaborated with Harrison, Beesly and others in the translation of Comte's System of Positive Polity (1875). His pamphlet The Unity of Comte's Life and Doctrine (1866) was a reply to the strictures of John Stuart Mill on Comte's later writings. A course of lectures, France under Richelieu and Colbert, was published in 1866.

In 1897 Bridges published an edition of Roger Bacon's Opus Majus, reissued with corrections in 1900. He contributed regularly to the Positivist Review; a selection of these articles was published posthumously as Illustrations of Positivism. Contemporaries judged that he influenced the thought of his day, through his writing, conversation and humanitarianism, to a greater extent than his public fame suggested. A reviewer in Nature later described him as "the most philosophic and scientific mind among the leaders of the positivist movement" of his generation.

== Clubs and social circle ==
Bridges moved in the reformist intellectual circles of London from the 1870s. He was a member of the Savile Club from 1878 to 1892, where the membership of the period included many of the writers, scientists and university men of his generation.

== Personal life ==
Bridges married, as his second wife, Mary Alice Hadwen, daughter of a Halifax silk manufacturer, in 1869. He died at Tunbridge Wells on 15 June 1906. A memoir by Susan Living, A Nineteenth-Century Teacher: John Henry Bridges, drawing on his letters, was published in 1926. A portrait of Bridges by Frederic Yates hangs at the Royal College of Physicians. His correspondence with Richard Congreve is held by the British Library (Add MS 45227), with Frederic Harrison at the London School of Economics, and with French positivists at the Maison d'Auguste Comte, Paris.

== Selected works ==
- (trans.) Auguste Comte, A General View of Positivism (1865)
- The Unity of Comte's Life and Doctrine: A Reply to Strictures on Comte's Later Writings Addressed to J. S. Mill (1866)
- France under Richelieu and Colbert (1866)
- (trans., with others) Auguste Comte, System of Positive Polity (1875)
- Harvey and his Successors: The Harveian Oration (1892)
- (ed.) Roger Bacon, The 'Opus Majus' of Roger Bacon (1897; corrected edition 1900)
- Essays and Addresses (posthumous, 1907)
- Illustrations of Positivism (posthumous; ed. H. Gordon Jones)
