= Clotilde de Vaux =

French writer

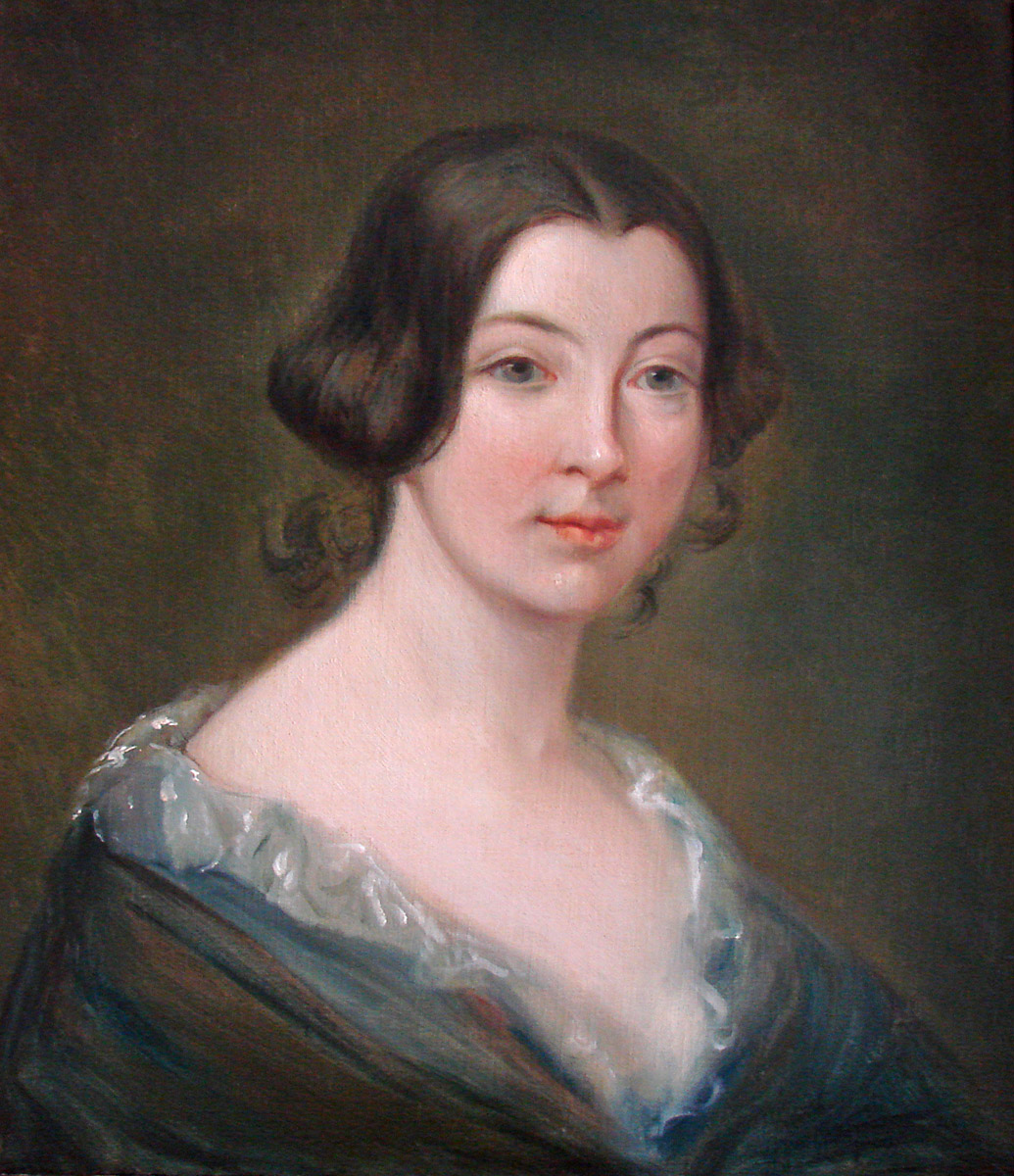
- Born: Clotilde Marie; April 3, 1815; Paris, France
- Died: April 5, 1846 (aged 31); Paris, France
- Education: Maison d'éducation de la Légion d'honneur
- Occupations: Poet, writer
- Parent(s): Simon Marie (father) and Henriette de Ficquelmont (mother)
- Family: De Ficquelmont

Clotilde de Vaux, born Clotilde Marie (April 3, 1815 – April 5, 1846), was a French intellectual known to have inspired the French philosopher Auguste Comte's Religion of Humanity.

== Biography ==
=== Early life and education ===
Charlotte Clotilde Josephine Marie was born in Paris on April 3, 1815. She was the daughter of Simon Marie (1775–1855) an infantry captain in Napoleon's Grande Armée from a modest background, and Henriette Josephine de Ficquelmont (1780–1843), member of an old but impoverished noble family of Lorraine.

The financial situation of her father, retired Captain Marie, was dire for a household with a wife and three children: Clotilde (born in 1815), Maximilian (born in 1819) and Leon (born in 1820) therefore, her father was given the office of tax collector in Méru near Paris to help him.

Clotilde spent her childhood in Méru with her two younger brothers Maximilien and Leon. Clotilde de Vaux was educated at the Maison d'éducation de la Légion d'honneur.

=== Marriage and later life ===
In 1835 she had a marriage of convenience with an Amédée de Vaux, who helped her father at his tax collection office in Méru. After incurring enormous gambling debts, he eventually left his wife and fled to Belgium.

According to the Code Civil of the time, women were unable to remarry without previously being divorced and, since no divorce had been issued, de Vaux was forbidden to remarry. Consequently, she returned to Paris, first living with her parents before moving to her own place in Marais' rue Payenne. One of her uncles Karl Ludwig von Ficquelmont, Minister-president of the Austrian Empire, granted her a housing allowance. Clotilde decided to begin a career as a writer and wrote short stories for literary magazines.

In October 1844, when visiting her brother, de Vaux met one of his Polytechnique's Professors, philosopher Auguste Comte. The first known letter from Comte to de Vaux is dated April 30, 1845 and from that day on it was clear that he was in love with her, a love which Clotilde, a devout Catholic, firmly rejected. Nonetheless she continued their correspondence until her sudden death of tuberculosis a year later.

Comte, recognizing de Vaux as his muse, was impressed by her morality, which helped him to understand the religious dimension of the human condition. Though de Vaux was a Catholic, Comte only considered Catholicism to be a step towards the positive stage. Nonetheless, de Vaux's faith persuaded him to create a religion for positivist societies in order to fulfill the cohesive function once held by traditional worship.

== Birth of the Religion of Humanity ==
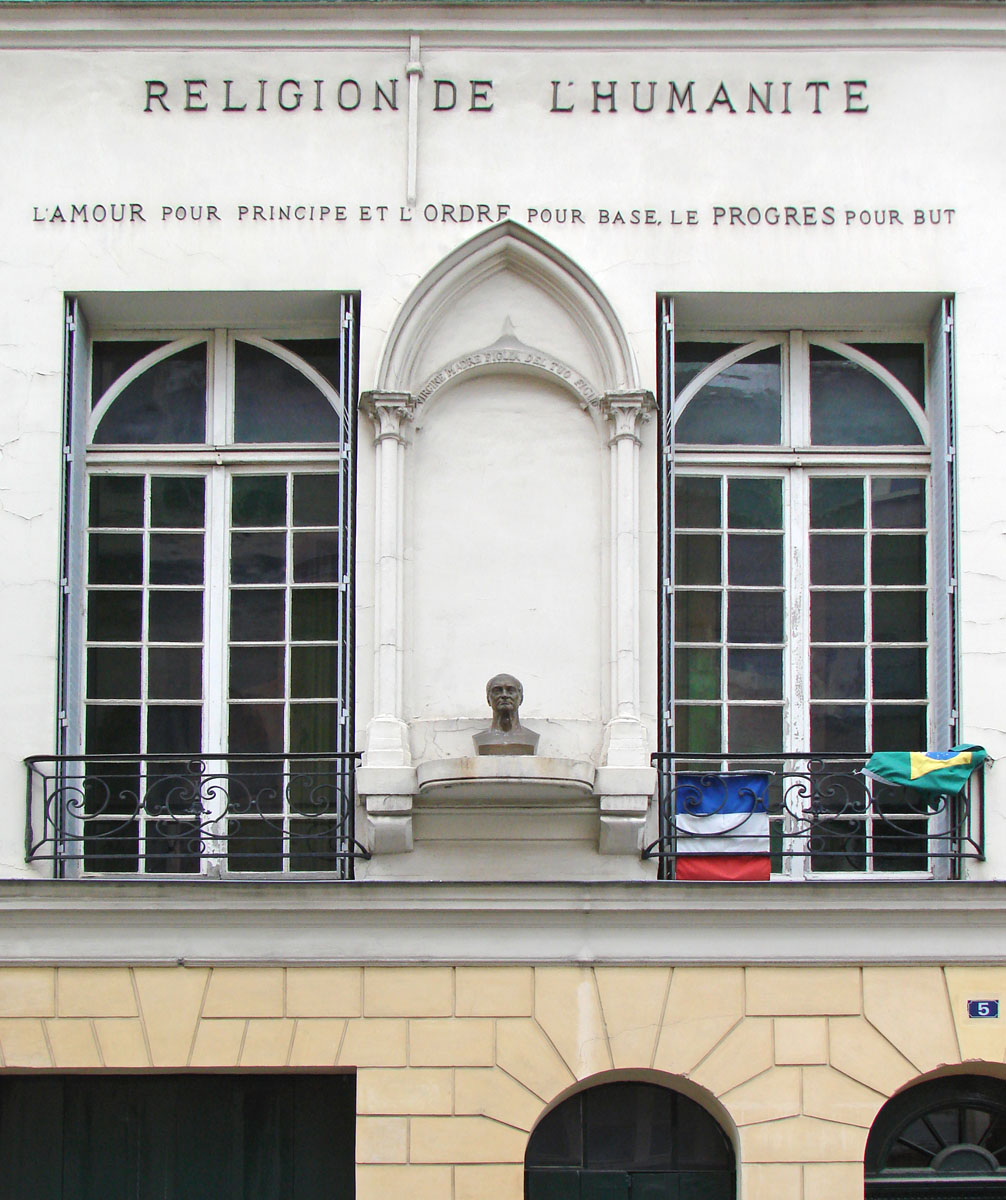
View of Paris' Humanity Chapel, hosted in Clotilde's house rue Payenne

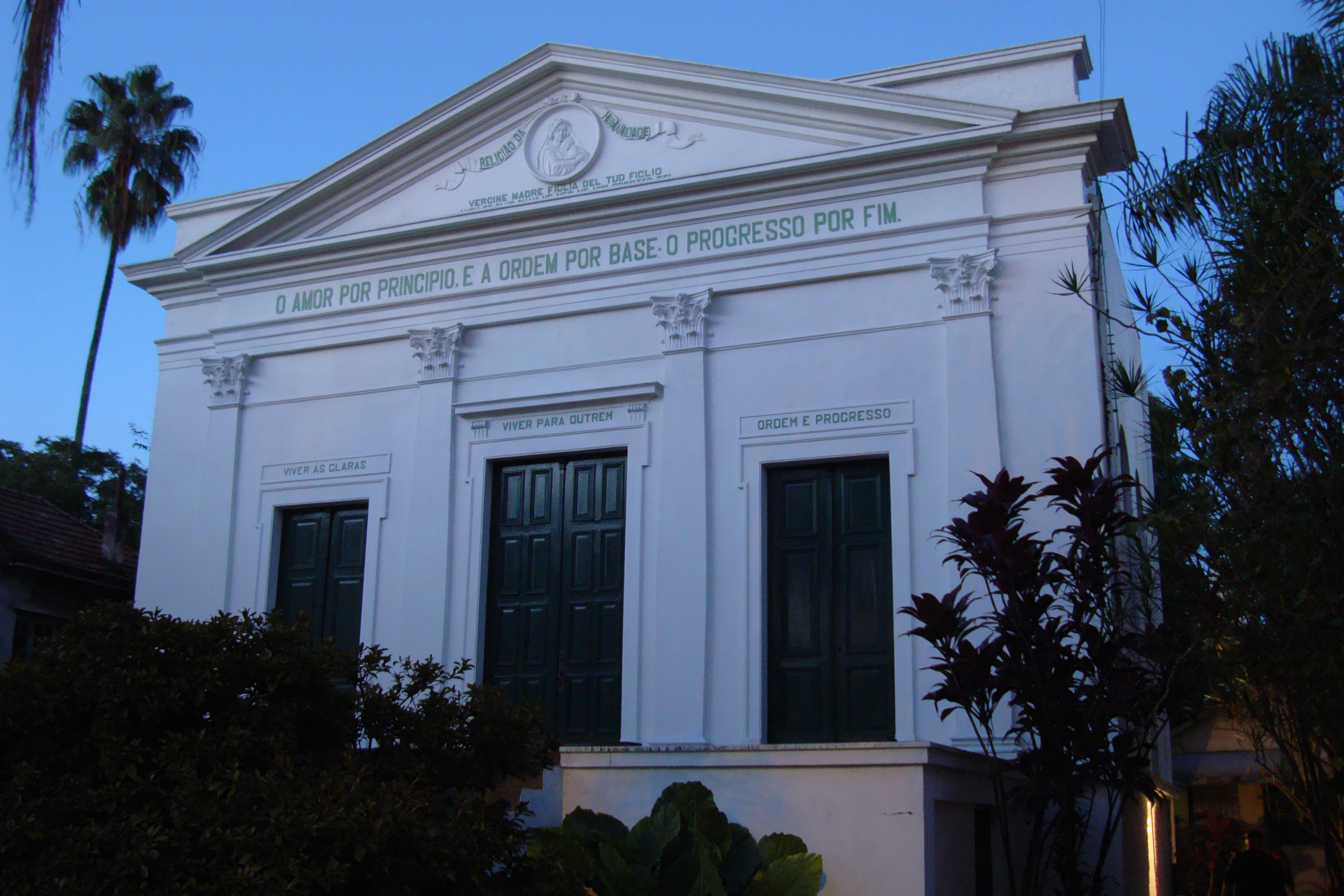
Positivist Chapel in Porto Alegre (Brazil)

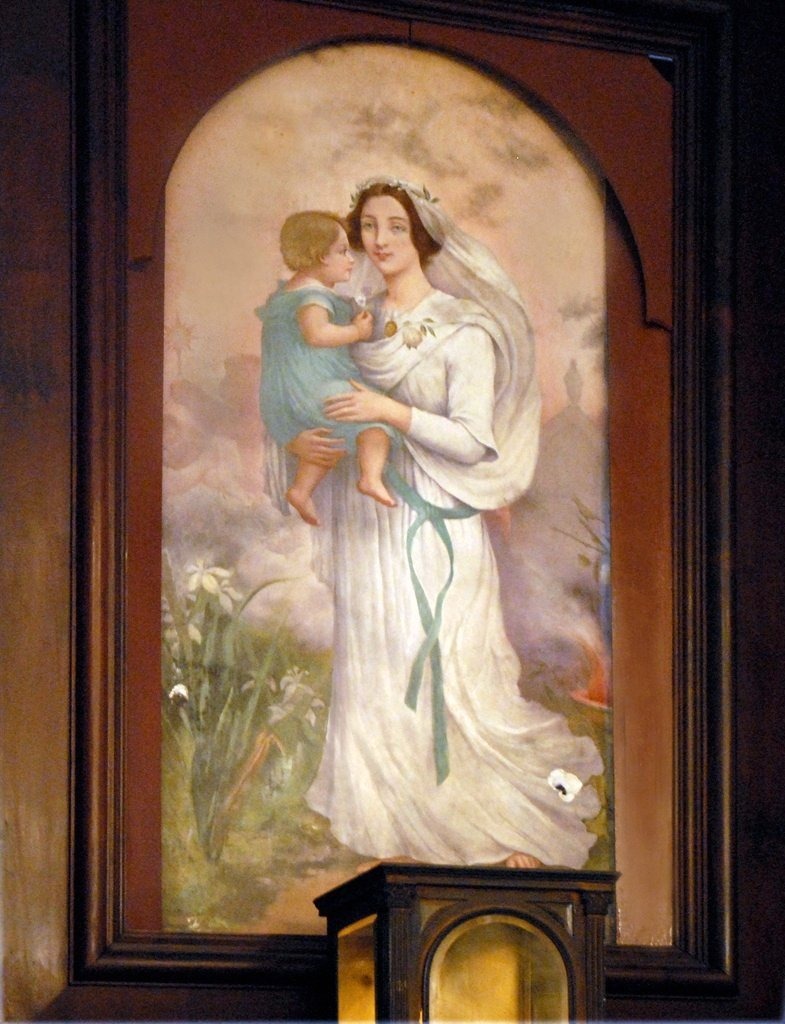
Portrait of de Vaux in the Chapel of Humanity, Paris

In mourning after Clotilde's death, Comte dedicated himself to reorganise his previous philosophical system into a new positivist secular religion: the Positivist Church or Religion of Humanity.

Comte's secular religion is no vague effusion of humanistic piety, but a complete system of belief and ritual, with a calendar reform called the 'positivist calendar' (with Sainte Clotilde's day each April 6 and a Day of Holy Women), liturgy and sacraments, priesthood and pontiff, all organized around the public veneration of Humanity, the Nouveau Grand-Être Suprême (New Supreme Great Being) made after Clotilde de Vaux.

- In Système de politique positive (1851–1854), Auguste Comte expressed his idea of a " religion of Humanity ", whose pillars are:
  - altruism, leading to generosity and selfless dedication to others.
  - order : Comte thought that after the French Revolution, society needed restoration of order.
  - progress : the consequences of industrial and technical breakthroughs for human societies.
- In Catéchisme positiviste (1851), Comte defined the Church of Humanity's sacraments :
  - the Introduction (nomination and sponsoring)
  - the Admission (end of education)
  - the Destination (choice of a career)
  - the Marriage,
  - the Retirement (age 63),
  - the Séparation, social extreme unction,
  - the Incorporation, 3 years after death.

Comte's "Religion of Humanity" was rather unsuccessful in France but has been very influential in Latin America, especially in Brazil (see above) and has inspired the rise of the "Church of Humanity" in England and its variant in New York City, both being extremely small today.

== Writings ==
- Pensées d'une fleur, poems
- Lucie, series of short stories published in Le National
- "Willelmine", short story

== Bibliography ==
- Charles de Rouvre, L'amoureuse histoire d'Auguste comte et de Clotilde de Vaux, Calmann-Lévy, 1920.
- André Thérive, Clotilde de Vaux ou La déesse morte, Albin Michel, 1957
- Henri Gouhier, La vie d'Auguste Comte (1931, rééd. 1997), libr. phil. Vrin, Coll. bibl. des textes Phil.
