= Richard Congreve =

English philosopher (1818–1899)

Photographic portrait of Richard Congreve

Richard Congreve (4 September 1818 – 5 July 1899) was the first English philosopher to openly espouse the Religion of Humanity, the godless form of religious humanism that was introduced by Auguste Comte, as a distinct form of positivism. Congreve was the first thinker to offer a systematic policy, on positivist lines, to dismantle the British Empire. In 1859, after issuing controversial anti-imperialist pamphlets on Gibraltar and India, he delivered his 'first sermon' as a Positivist apostle and 'vicar' of the Religion of Humanity. He later founded the London Positivist Society in 1867 and, after a schism with his closest followers in 1878, he broke off to formally found the Comtist Church of Humanity.

== Life and education ==
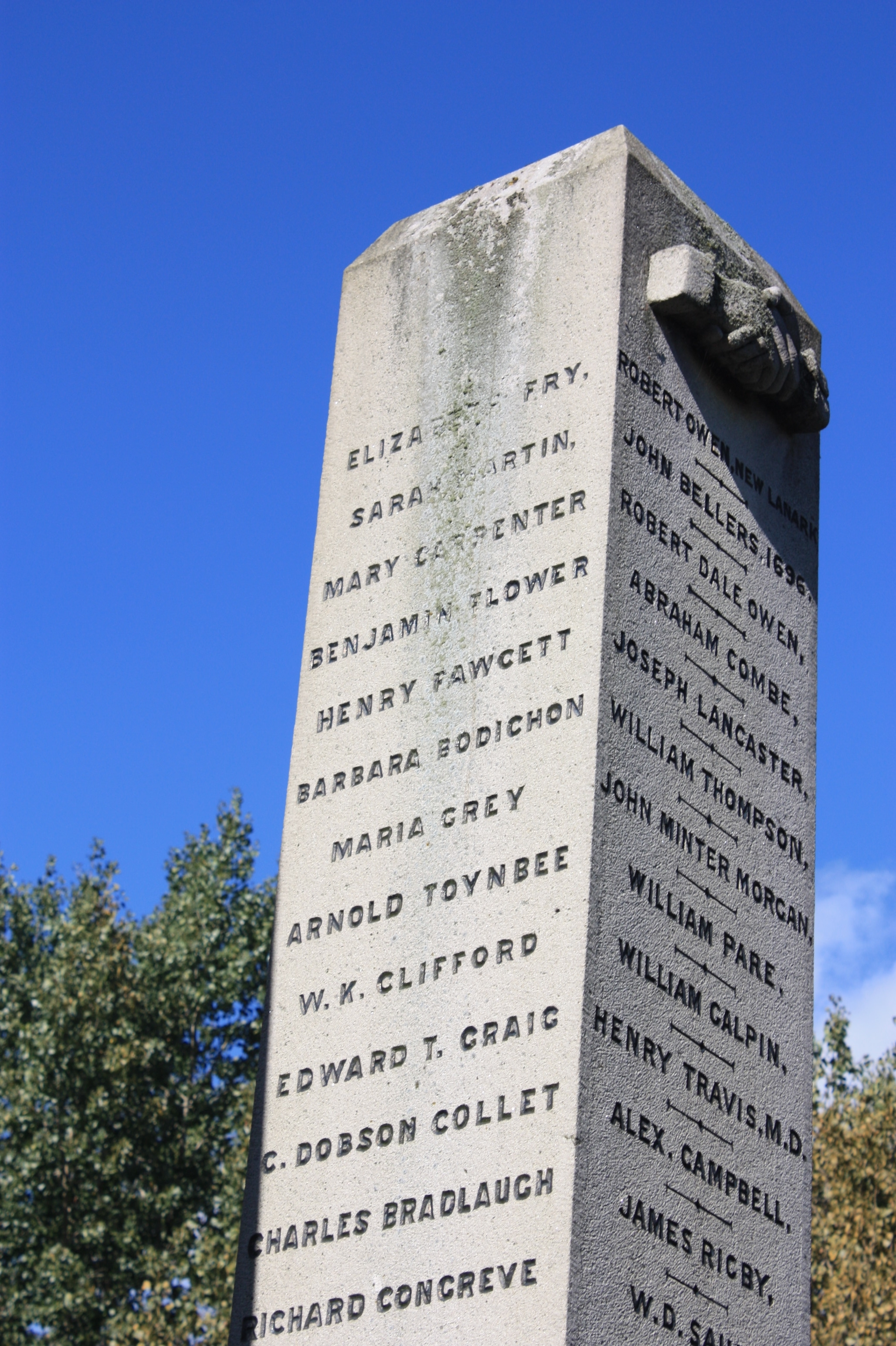
Richard Congreve's name on the Reformers Monument, Kensal Green Cemetery

He was born at Leamington Hastings, Warwickshire, on 4 September 1818. He was educated under Thomas Arnold at Rugby School, and at the University of Oxford, where he gained a scholarship at Wadham College, Oxford, matriculated on 23 February 1837, graduated B.A. (first class in literæ humaniores) in 1840, and proceeded M.A. in 1843. He was president of the Oxford Union in 1841.

He came to Oxford a typical pupil of Arnold – high-minded, intensely earnest, and latitudinarian in his theological opinions. His success in the schools was naturally followed by election to a fellowship at his college; he was a master at Rugby from 1845 to 1848,; he resided as tutor for the next ten years. His influence upon his pupils is said to have been singularly bracing, morally as well as intellectually.

The turning-point in Congreve's life was a visit to Paris shortly after the French Revolution of 1848. He there met Jules Barthélemy-Saint-Hilaire and Auguste Comte, and the influence of Comte stayed with him. He adopted the entire positivist system, including the religious cult. He resigned his fellowship (1855), left Oxford, and soon afterwards founded the positivist community in London.

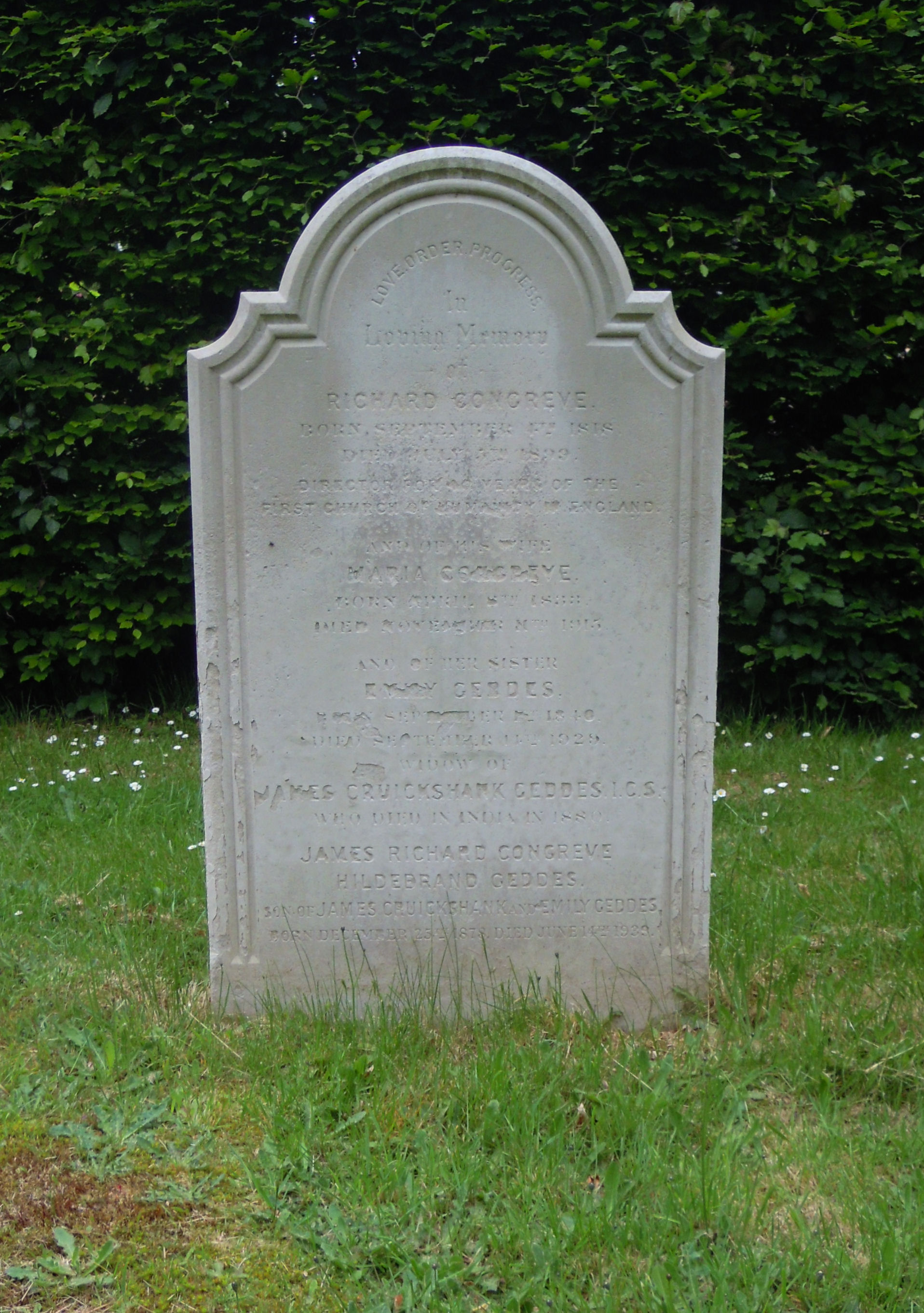
Grave of Richard Congreve in Brookwood Cemetery in 2019

Congreve studied medicine, and in 1866 was admitted member of the Royal College of Physicians. In the early days of the positivist movement he took the major part in the establishment of the propaganda in Chapel Street, Lamb's Conduit Street, London, and for some years worked harmoniously with Frederic Harrison and other leading positivists. In 1878, however, he issued a circular (17 June) in which he claimed for himself an authority independent of Pierre Laffitte, Comte's principal executor, and as such then universally acknowledged as the head of the positivist community. Some positivists joined him; others, among whom were Frederic Harrison, John Henry Bridges, Edward Spencer Beesly, Vernon Lushington, and James Cotter Morison, remained in union with Laffitte, and opened Newton Hall, Fetter Lane, London, as their place of meeting.

Congreve used the freedom which this separation allowed him to elaborate a higher form of ritual. Despite failing health, he maintained his unfashionable opinions, and kept up his priestly functions, until his death, at Hampstead, on 5 July 1899. He was cremated and then buried in Brookwood Cemetery.

== Family ==
In 1856, he married Mary, daughter of John Bury of Warwick.

== Works ==
Congreve published:

- The Politics of Aristotle: with English Notes, London, 1855; 2nd edit. 1874.
- The Roman Empire of the West: Four Lectures delivered at the Philosophical Institution, Edinburgh, London, 1855.
- Gibraltar; or, the Foreign Policy of England, London, 1857, (a plea for the surrender of the Rock).
- India, London, 1857 (a plea for the abandonment of the British Raj).
- The Catechism of the Positive Religion. Translated from the French of Auguste Comte, London, 1858; 2nd edit. 1883; 3rd edit. 1891.
- A Letter on the Strike, London, 1859
- Italy and the Western Powers, and Elizabeth of England, London, 1862.
- Mr. Broadhead and the Anonymous Press, London, 1867. On William Broadhead.
- Essays, Political, Social, and Religious, London, 1874; 2nd ser. 1892.
- Human Catholicism, London, 1876.
