= Nontheistic religion =

Religious thought and practice independent of belief in deities

Nontheistic religions (not to be confused with atheism) are traditions of thought within a religious context—some otherwise aligned with theism, others not—in which nontheism informs religious beliefs or practices.

Nontheism has been applied and plays significant roles in Hinduism, Buddhism, and Jainism. While many approaches to religion exclude nontheism by definition, some inclusive definitions of religion show how religious practice and belief do not depend on the presence of a god or gods. For example, Paul James and Peter Mandaville distinguish between religion and spirituality, but provide a definition of the term that avoids the usual reduction to "religions of the book":

Religion can be defined as a relatively-bounded system of beliefs, symbols and practices that addresses the nature of existence, and in which communion with others and Otherness is lived as if it both takes in and spiritually transcends socially-grounded ontologies of time, space, embodiment and knowing.

== Buddhism ==
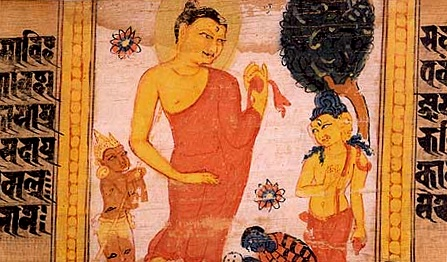
The Buddha descending from Trāyastriṃśa Heaven. Palm leaf manuscript. Nalanda, Bihar, India

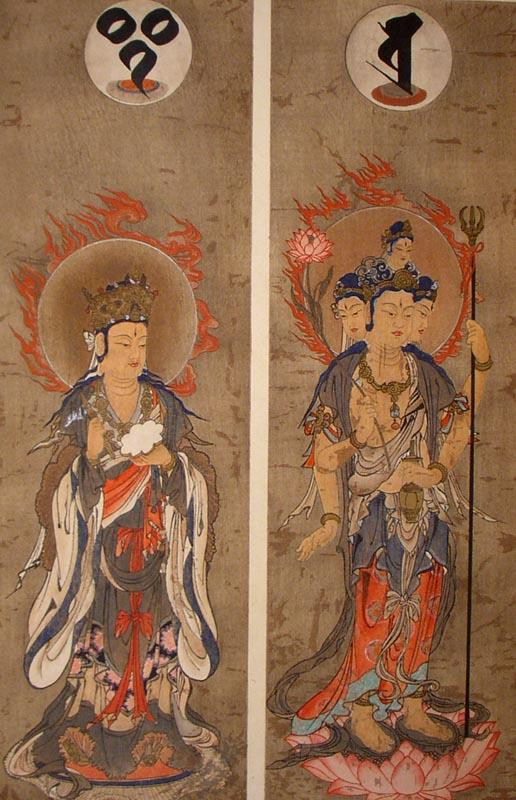
The gods Śakra (left) and Brahmā (right)

=== Existence of gods ===
The Gautama Buddha taught that devas ('gods') indeed exist but regarded them as remaining trapped in samsara, as well as necessarily wiser than humans. In fact, the Buddha is often portrayed as a teacher of the gods, if not superior to them. However, some gods are considered to be manifestations of buddhas, such as the five Jambhalas and the devas who reside in pure abodes, and other deities such as Tara who based on Buddhist traditions.

Since the advent of the Buddha and his religion, denying the existence of a creator deity has been seen as a key way to distinguish Buddhist from non-Buddhist philosophies of divinity. The question of an independent creator deity was addressed by the Buddha in the Brahmajala Sutta. The Buddha condemned the notion of a creator and recognized that such concepts are associated with the false view of eternalism, and, like the 61 other views, the belief in a creator deity leads to suffering when individuals become attached to it. He further states that these perspectives may generate desire, aversion, and delusion. At the conclusion of the Sutta, the Buddha affirms that he is aware of these 62 views, as well as the ultimate truth that transcends them. Subsequently, Buddhist philosophers have also extensively critiqued the concept of an eternal creator deity concerned with humanity.

=== Metaphysical questions ===
On one occasion, when presented with a problem of metaphysics by the monk Malunkyaputta, the Buddha responded with the Parable of the Poisoned Arrow. When a man is shot with an arrow thickly smeared with poison, his family summons a doctor to have the poison removed, and the doctor gives an antidote:

But the man refuses to let the doctor do anything before certain questions can be answered. The wounded man demands to know who shot the arrow, what his caste and job is, and why he shot him. He wants to know what kind of bow the man used and how he acquired the ingredients used in preparing the poison. Malunkyaputta, such a man will die before getting the answers to his questions. It is no different for one who follows the Way. I teach only those things necessary to realize the Way. Things which are not helpful or necessary, I do not teach.

== Christianity ==
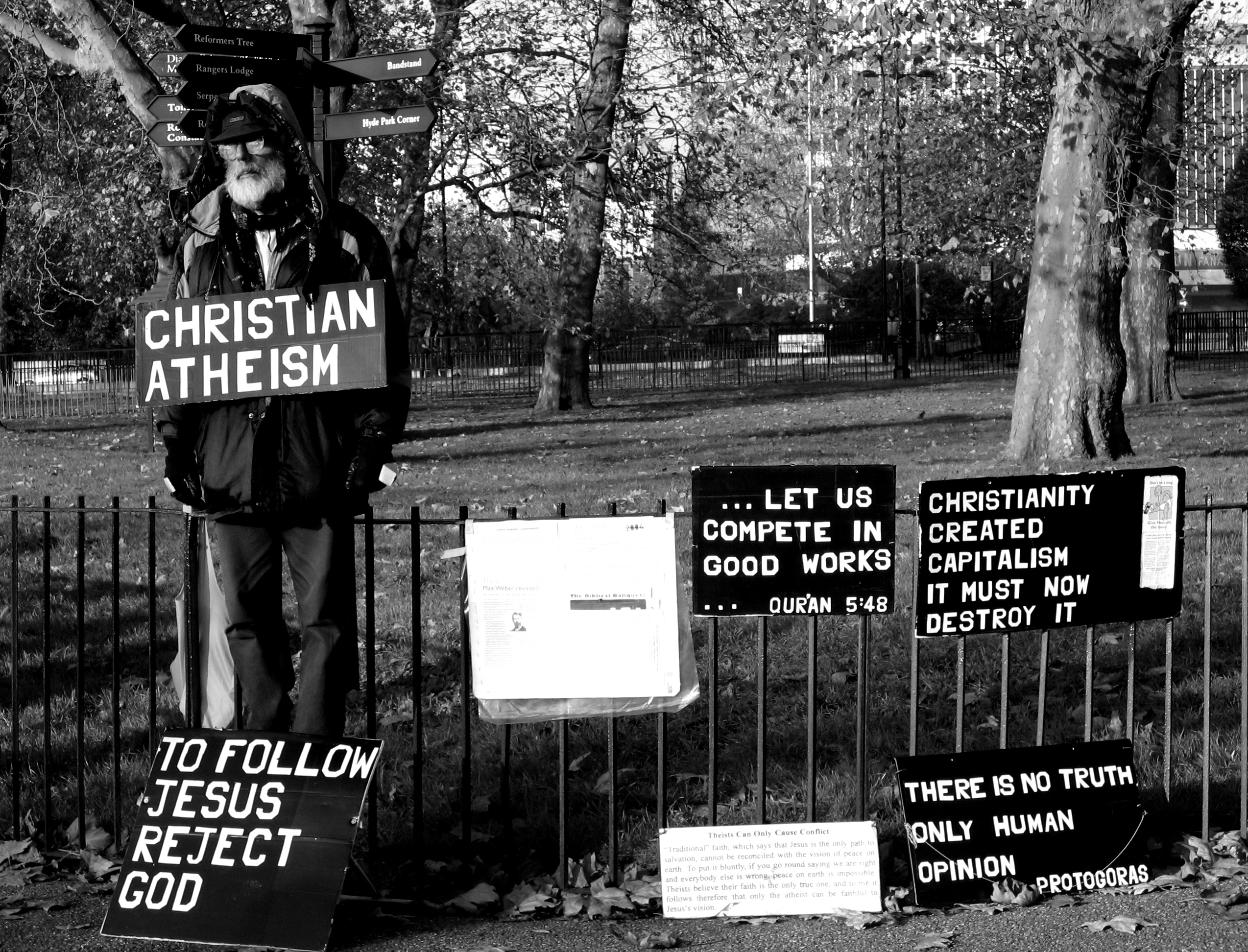
A man promoting Christian atheism at Speakers' Corner in Hyde Park, London, in 2005. One of his placards reads "To follow Jesus, reject God."

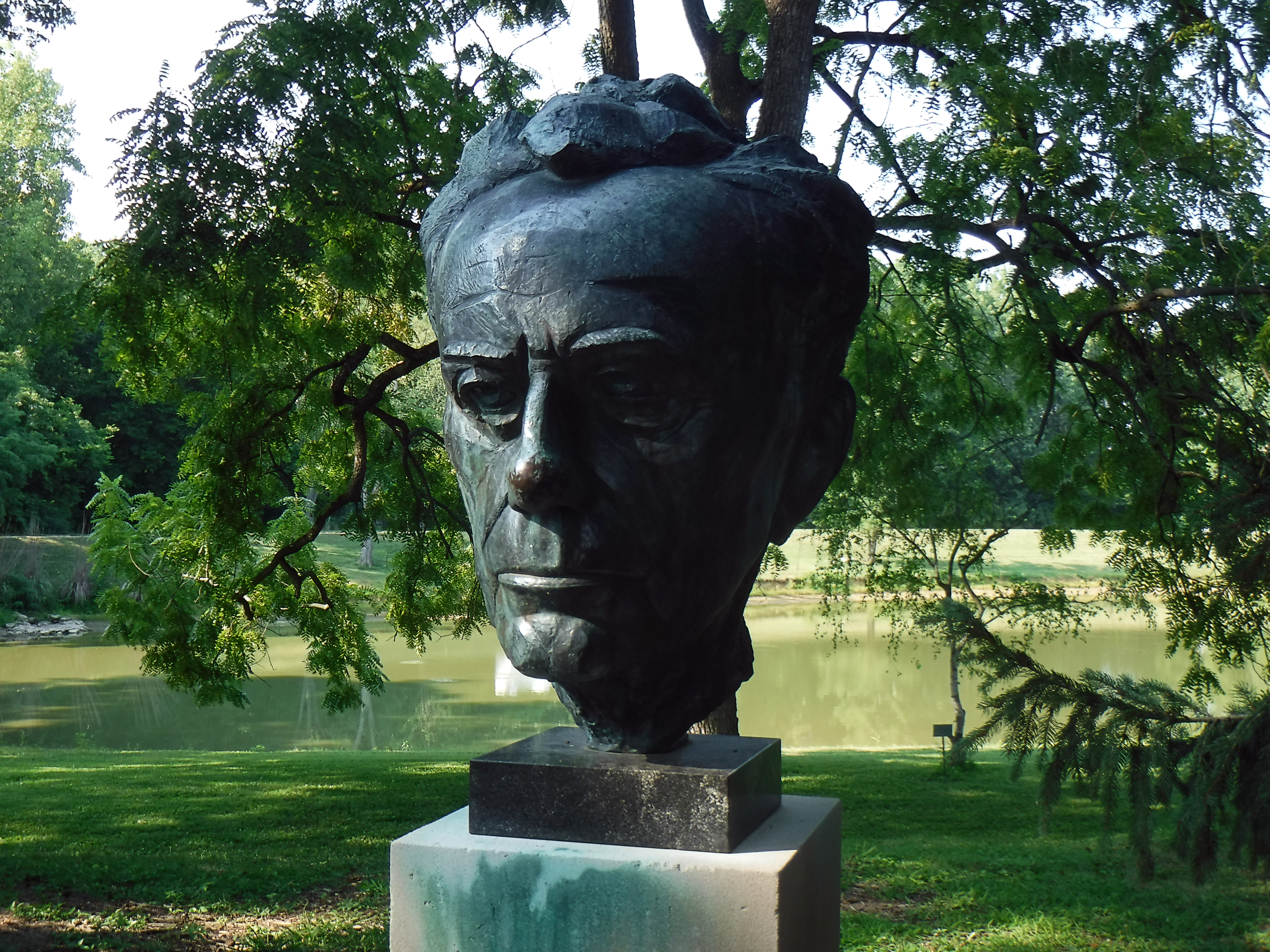
Bust of Tillich by James Rosati in New Harmony, Indiana

A few liberal Christian theologians define a "nontheistic God" as "the ground of all being" rather than as a personal divine being.

Many of their theological ideas draw on Christian existentialist philosopher Paul Tillich, known for the phrase "the ground of all being". Tillich wrote in his Systematic Theology, "God does not exist. He is being itself beyond essence and existence. Therefore, to argue that God exists is to deny him." The credo summarizes his view of God, which suggests that God is not a being within time and space, as that would limit God and make God finite. Since all beings are finite, and if God is the Creator of everything, God cannot be finite because a finite being cannot sustain an infinite array of finite things. Therefore, God is seen as beyond being, transcending finitude and limitation, embodying the power or essence of being itself.

Tillich saw God more as a symbol. He appreciated using symbols to envision God, something meaningful and abstract, and appreciated using a personal image of God to relate to the "ground of being." He believed that major Christian themes remained meaningful through re-envisioning Christian stories that were accepted literally. He also perceived the root of atheism as a rejection of God's traditional image.

From a nontheistic, naturalist, and rationalist perspective, divine grace appears to be the same as luck.

=== Nontheist Quakers ===
A nontheist Friend or an atheist Quaker is someone who affiliates with, identifies with, engages in and/or affirms Quaker practices and processes, but who does not accept a belief in a theistic understanding of God, a Supreme Being, the divine, the soul, or the supernatural. Like theistic Friends, nontheist Friends are actively interested in realizing centered peace, simplicity, integrity, community, equality, and social justice in the Society of Friends and beyond.

=== Unitarian Universalists ===
Originating from Unitarianism and Christian universalism, two liberal strands of Christianity, Unitarian Universalism developed into a non-creedal religious movement that encompasses a wide range of theological perspectives, including atheism, agnosticism, humanism, and other forms of nontheism. Nontheistic Unitarian Universalists generally emphasize ethical values such as human dignity, compassion, reason, freedom of conscience, equality, and social responsibility rather than belief in a supernatural deity. Religious practice may therefore focus on communal worship, meditation, reflection, music, ritual, and social action, understood as ways of cultivating meaning, community, and ethical commitment rather than as acts of devotion to a supernatural being.

== Hinduism ==
Hinduism is characterised by extremely diverse beliefs and practices. In the words of Robert Charles Zaehner, "It is perfectly possible to be a good Hindu whether one's personal views incline toward monism, monotheism, polytheism, or even atheism." He goes on to say that it is a religion that neither depends on the existence or non-existence of God or Gods. More broadly, Hinduism can be seen as having three more fundamental strands of thought: one featuring a personal creator or divine being, a second that emphasises an impersonal Absolute, and a third that is pluralistic and non-absolute. The latter two traditions can be seen as nontheistic.

Although the Vedas are broadly concerned with the completion of ritual, there are some elements that can be interpreted as either nontheistic or precursors to the later developments of the nontheistic tradition. The oldest Hindu scripture, the Rig Veda, mentions that "there is only one god though the sages may give it various names" (1.164.46). is Max Müller termed this henotheism, and it can be seen as indicating one, non-dual divine reality, with little emphasis on personality. The Nasadiya Sukta, the 129th hymn of the tenth and final mandala (or chapter) of the Rig Veda, considers creation and asks, "The gods came afterwards, with the creation of this universe. "Who then knows whence it has arisen?" This can be seen to contain the intuition that there must be a single principle behind all phenomena: "the one" (tad ekam), self-sufficient, to which distinctions cannot be applied.

The Upanishads, reckoned to have been written in the first millennium (coeval with the ritualistic Brahmanas), challenged the Vedic emphasis on ritual. The Upanishads can be seen as expressing new sources of power in India. Also separate from the Upanishadic tradition were bands of wandering ascetics called vadins, whose largely nontheistic notions rejected the idea that religious knowledge was the property of the Brahmins. Many of these were shramanas, who represented a non-Vedic tradition rooted in India's pre-Aryan history. The emphasis of the Upanishads turned to knowledge, specifically the ultimate identity of all phenomena. This is expressed in the notion of Brahman, the key idea of the Upanishads, and much later philosophizing has been taken up with deciding whether Brahman is personal or impersonal. The understanding of the nature of Brahman as impersonal is based on the definition of it as "ekam eva advitiyam" (Chandogya Upanishad 6.2.1): it is one without a second and to which no substantive predicates can be attached. Further, both the Chandogya and Brihadaranyaka Upanishads assert that the individual atman ('soul') and the impersonal Brahman are one. The mahāvākya statement "Tat Tvam Asi", found in the Chandogya Upanishad, can be taken to indicate this unity. The latter Upanishad uses the negative term neti neti to describe the divine.

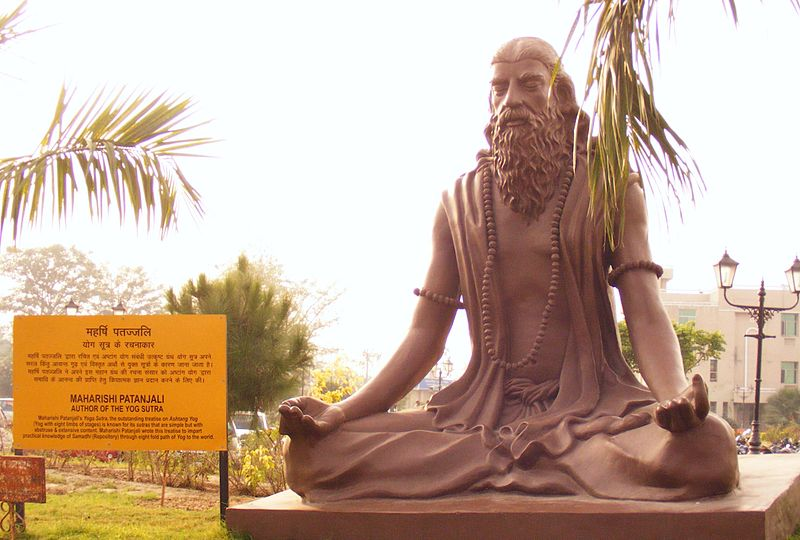
Patañjali statue in Pantanjali Yog Peeth Haridwar

The classical Samkhya, Mimamsa, early Vaisheshika, and early Nyaya schools of Hinduism do not accept the notion of an omnipotent creator God. While the Sankhya and Mimamsa schools no longer have significant followings in India, they are both influential in the development of later schools of philosophy. The Yoga of Patanjali is the school that probably owes the most to the Samkhya thought. This school is dualistic, dividing "spirit" (purusha) from "nature" (prakṛti). It holds samadhi ('concentrative union') as its ultimate goal, and it does not consider God's existence as either essential or necessary to achieving this.

The Bhagavad Gita contains passages that bear a monistic reading and others that bear a theistic reading. Generally, the book as a whole has been interpreted by some who see it as containing a primarily nontheistic message, and by others who stress its theistic message. These broadly follow either Adi Shankara or Ramanuja.W4 An example of a nontheistic passage is, "The supreme Brahman is without any beginning. That is called neither being nor non-being." Shankara interpreted this as Brahman being describable only through negation (neti neti).

The Advaita Vedanta of Gaudapada and Adi Shankara rejects theism as a consequence of its insistence that Brahman is "without attributes, indivisible, subtle, inconceivable, and without blemish; Brahman is one and without a second. There is nothing other than He." This means that it lacks properties usually associated with God such as omniscience, perfect goodness, omnipotence, and additionally is identical with the whole of reality, rather than being a causal agent or ruler of it.

== Jainism ==
Jain texts claim that the universe consists of jiva (life force or souls) and ajiva (lifeless objects). According to Jain doctrine, the universe and its constituents – soul, matter, space, time, and principles of motion – have always existed. The universe and the matter and souls within it are eternal and uncreated, and there is no omnipotent creator god. Jainism offers an elaborate cosmology, including heavenly beings/devas, but these heavenly beings are not viewed as creators-they are subject to suffering and change like all other living beings, and are portrayed as mortal.

According to the Jain concept of divinity, any soul who destroys its karmas and desires, achieves liberation/Nirvana. A soul who destroys all its passions and desires has no desire to interfere in the working of the universe. If godliness is defined as the state of having freed one's soul from karmas and the attainment of enlightenment/Nirvana and a god as one who exists in such a state, then those who have achieved such a state can be termed gods (Tirthankara).

Besides scriptural authority, Jains also employ syllogism and deductive reasoning to refute creationist theories. Various views on divinity and the universe held by the Vedics, Sāmkhyas, Mimamsas, Buddhists, and other school of thoughts were criticized by Jain Ācāryas, such as Jinasena in Mahāpurāna.

== Taoism ==
Chinese Taoism or Daoism originally emphasizes the otherness of the divine, the Tao, which is at the same time immanent and transcendent, but not anthropomorphic. Only in later Taoism does a pantheon of gods emerge, and even then they are considered deities inferior to the principle of Tao, often representing cosmic or heavenly concepts. The god Shangdi might have originally as a symbolic of the Pole Star in northern China, eventually becoming a kind of intermediary between the impersonal Tao and the world of active creation. There is no creator deity in traditional Taoism, and universe is held to be in constant creation and change.

== Others ==
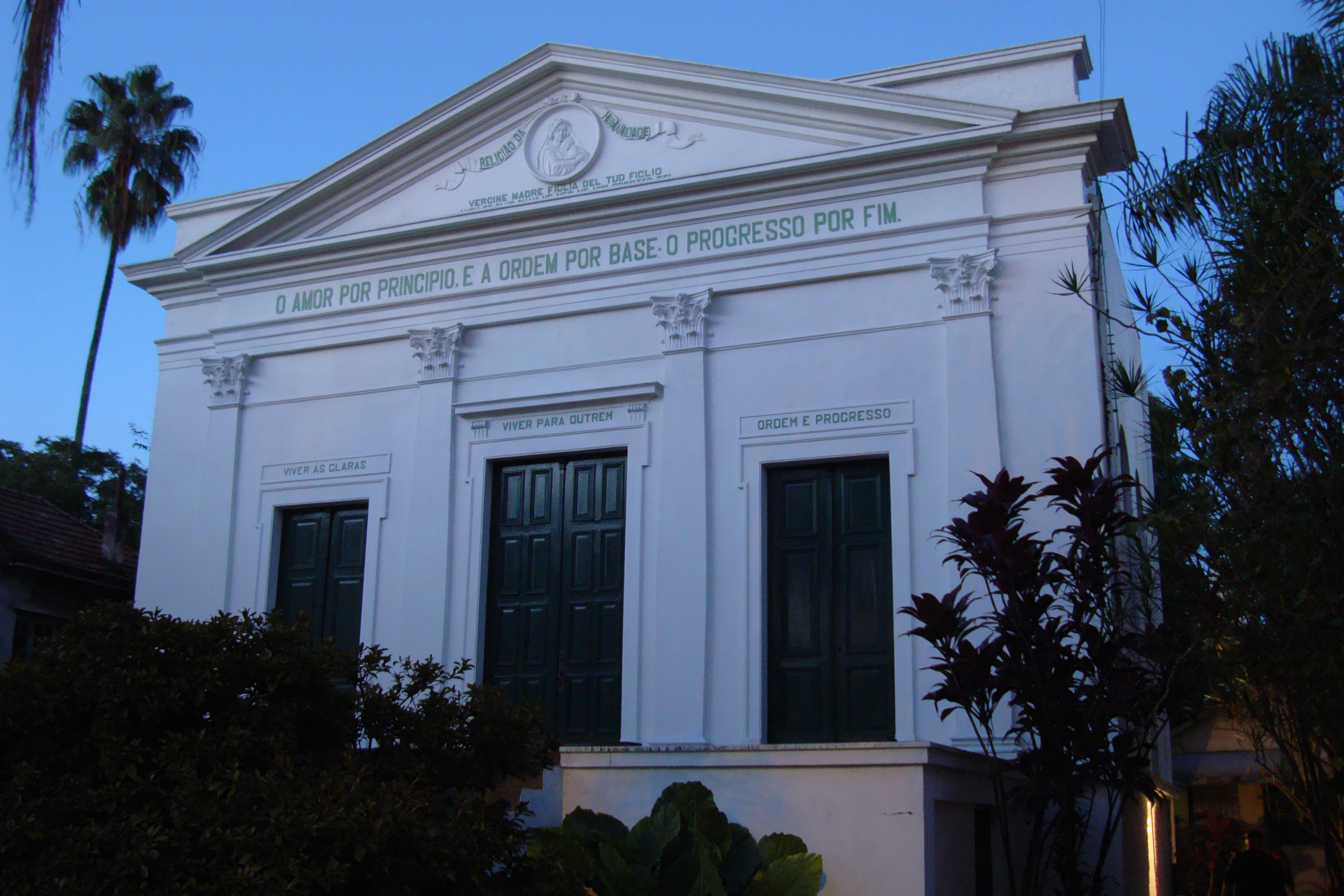
Postivist temple (of the "Religion of Humanity") in Porto Alegre, Brazil

Belief systems based on philosophical models not falling within established religious structures, such as Confucianism, Epicureanism, Deism, and Pandeism, have also been considered to be nontheistic religions.

The white supremacist Creativity movement has also been described as a nontheistic religion.

The Cult of Reason was formed in the maelstrom of the French Revolution. The avowedly atheistic founders of the Cult — including Antoine-François Momoro, who had famously coined the Revolutionary motto ″Unité, Indivisibilité de la République; Liberté, égalité, fraternité ou la mort″—sought to replace French Catholicism with a secular, Humanistic religion venerating philosophical principles such as Reason, Beauty, Nature and Truth.

The sociologist Auguste Comte devised a religion called the Religion of Humanity based on his Positivist principles. The Religion of Humanity is not a metaphysical religion and as such there are no gods or supernaturalisms in its belief.

Religious naturalism and Secular paganism are both umbrella terms encompassing a wide variety of individual and small-group perspectives on, and practices of nontheistic religion inspired by the natural world.

The Church of Satan adheres to LaVeyan Satanism, which is nontheistic. The Satanic Temple, a non-theistic religious organization, is officially recognized as a tax-exempt church in the U.S. Internal Revenue Service on 25 April 2019 and regards the figure of "Satan" as a symbolic figurehead rather than a supernatural entity.

== See also ==
- Antitheism
- Conceptions of God
- Ethical culture
- Falsifiability
- Freethought
- Humanism
- Ietsism
- Irreligion
- Jediism
- Jewish atheism
- Language, Truth, and Logic
- Mu (negative)
- Naturalistic pantheism
- Nondualism
- Pantheism
- Raëlism
- Religious naturalism
- Scientology
- Secular religion
- Speciesism
- Syntheism
- Transcendentalism
- Transtheism
- Unitarian Universalism
