= Pierre Laffitte (philosopher) =

French positivist philosopher (1823-1903)

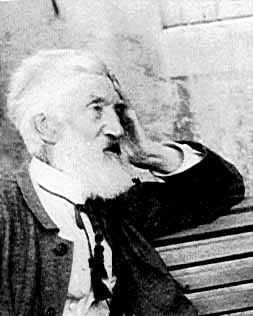
Pierre Laffitte, circa 1902.

Pierre Laffitte (21 February 1823 – 4 January 1903) was a French positivist philosopher.

Laffitte was born at Béguey, Gironde. Residing at Paris as a teacher of mathematics, he became a disciple of Auguste Comte, who appointed him his literary executor. On the schism of the Positivist body which followed Comte's death, he was recognized as head of the section which accepted the full Comtian doctrine; the other section adhered to Émile Littré, who rejected the religion of humanity as inconsistent with the philosophy of science of Comte's earlier period. From 1853 Laffitte delivered Positivist lectures in the room formerly occupied by Comte in the rue Monsieur le Prince. He published Les Grands Types de l'humanité (1875) and Cours de philosophie première (1889). In 1893 he was appointed to the new chair founded at the Collège de France for the exposition of the general history of science, and it was largely due to his inspiration that a statue to Comte was erected in the Place de la Sorbonne in 1902. Laffitte died in Paris. Lafitte with a delegation of positivists visited Constantinople in 1877 visited Midhat Pasha to advocate positivist principles as a non-Christian, modern system.

In the Positivist journal Revue Occidentale, he started the first "subscription for the erection of a Mosque in Paris, in honor of Islam" which led to the construction of the Great Mosque of Paris.
