= Religion of Humanity =

Secular religion created by Auguste Comte

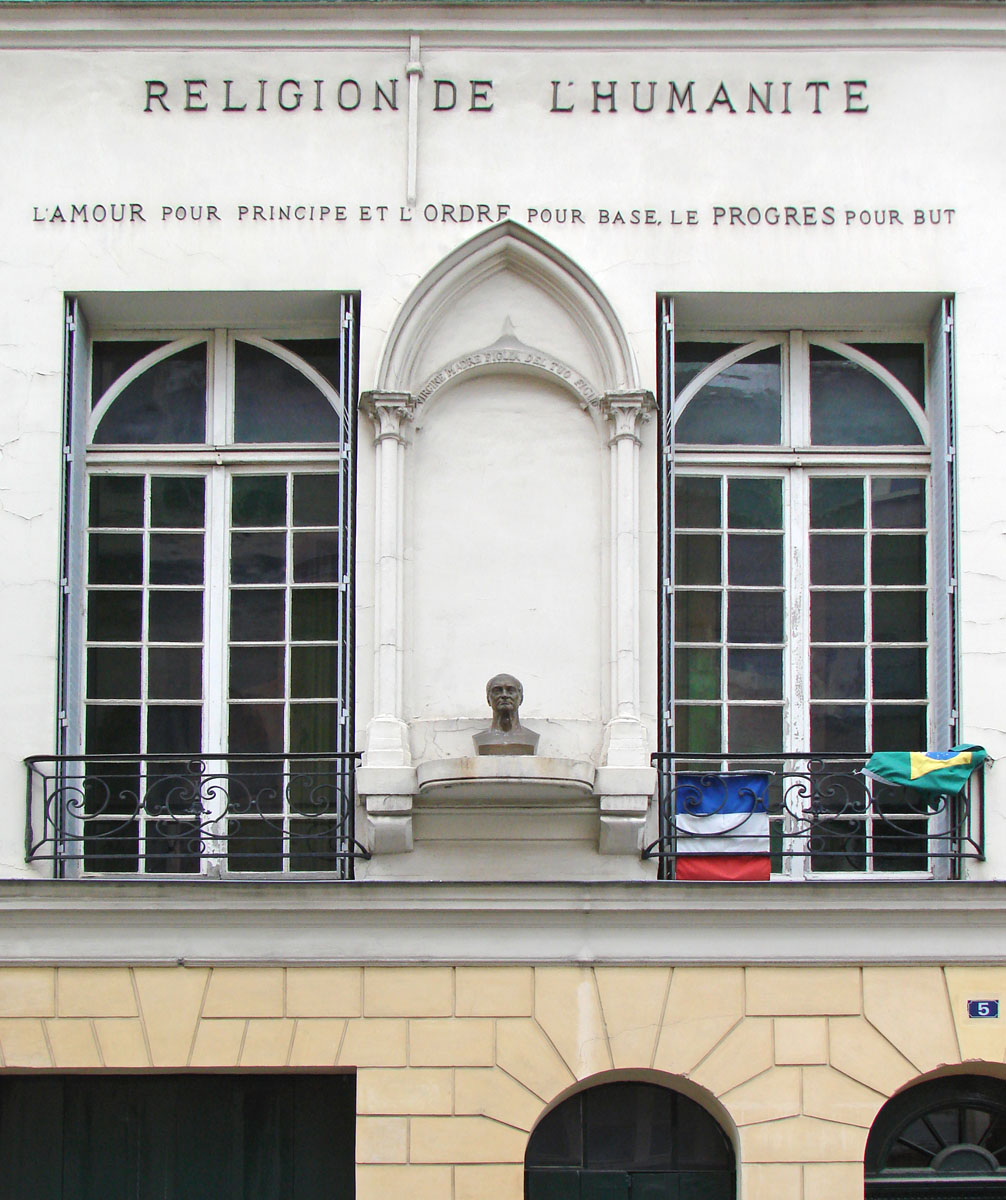
Chapelle of humanity in Paris, property of the Positivist Church of Brazil.

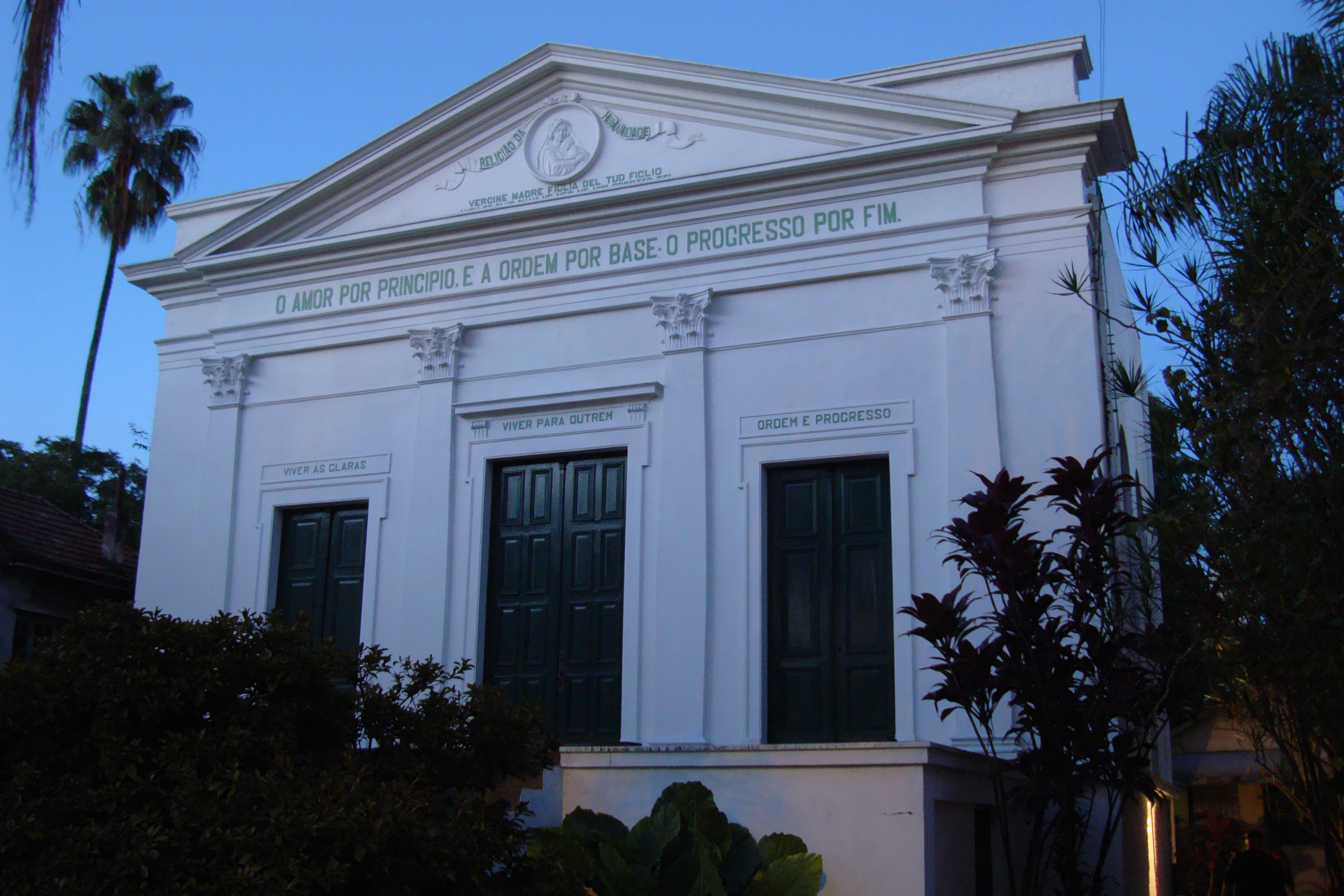
Positivist temple in Porto Alegre, Brazil.

Religion of Humanity (from French Religion de l'Humanité or église positiviste) is a secular religion proposed by Auguste Comte (1798–1857), the founder of positivist philosophy. Adherents of this religion have built chapels of Humanity in Brazil and France.

In the United States and Europe, Comte's ideas influenced others, and contributed to the emergence of ethical societies and "ethical churches", which led to the development of Ethical culture, congregational humanist, and secular humanist organisations.

== Origins ==
Comte developed the Religion of Humanity for positivist societies in order to fulfill the cohesive function once held by traditional worship. The religion was developed after Comte's passionate platonic relationship with Clotilde de Vaux, whom he idealised after her death. He became convinced that feminine values embodied the triumph of sentiment and morality. In a future science-based Positivist society there should also be a religion that would have power by virtue of moral force alone. In 1849, he proposed a calendar reform called the "positivist calendar", in which months were named after history's greatest leaders, thinkers, and artists, and arranged in chronological order. Each day was dedicated to a thinker. While the Religion of Humanity venerated only individuals who made positive contributions and excluded those who did not, Ludwig Feuerbach's religion venerated all human beings.

== Tenets ==
According to Tony Davies, Comte's secular and positive religion was "a complete system of belief and ritual, with liturgy and sacraments, priesthood and pontiff, all organized around the public veneration of Humanity", referred to as the Nouveau Grand-Être Suprême (New Supreme Great Being). "This was later to be supplemented in a positivist trinity by the Grand Fétish (the Earth) and the Grand Milieu (Cosmic Space)".

In Système de politique positive (1851–1854) Comte stated that the pillars of the religion are:

- altruism, leading to generosity and selfless dedication to others.
- order: Comte thought that after the French Revolution, society needed restoration of order.
- progress: the consequences of industrial and technical breakthroughs for human societies.

In Catéchisme positiviste (1851), Comte defined the Church of Humanity's seven sacraments:

- Introduction; (nomination and sponsoring)
- Admission; (end of education)
- Destination; (choice of a career)
- Marriage;
- Retirement; (age 63),
- Separation; (funeral rites),
- Incorporation; (absorption into history) – 3 years after death.

== Liturgy and priesthood ==
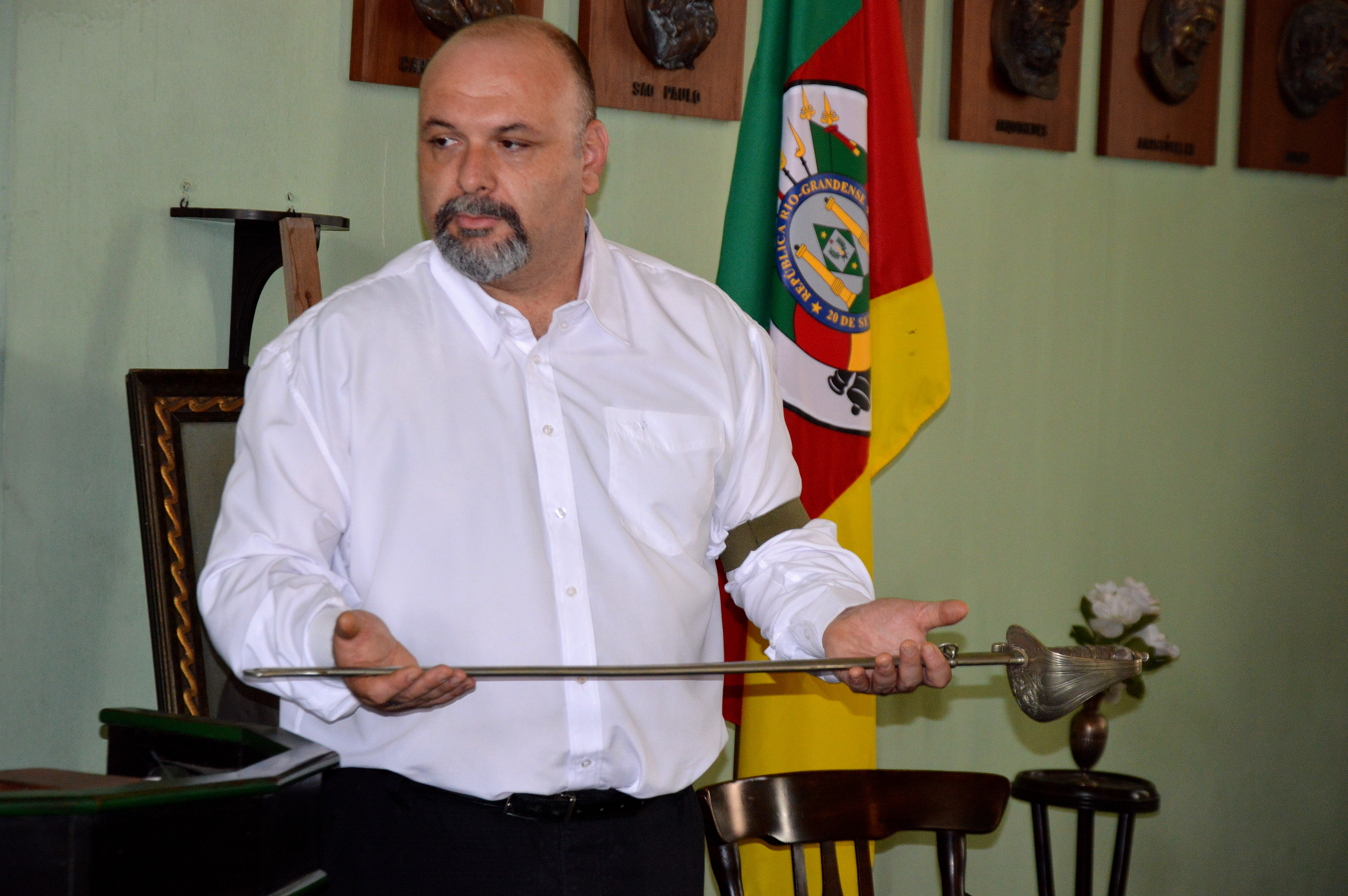
Erlon Jacques de Oliveira, Temple guardian in Porto Alegre

The Religion of Humanity was described by Thomas Huxley as "Catholicism minus Christianity". In addition to a holy trinity of Humanity, the Earth and Destiny, it had a priesthood. Priests were required to be married, because of the ennobling influence of womanhood. They would conduct services, including Positivist prayer, which was "a solemn out-pouring, whether in private or in public, of men's nobler feelings, inspiring them with larger and more comprehensive thoughts." The purpose of the religion was to increase altruism, so that believers acted always in the best interests of humanity as a whole. The priests would be international ambassadors of altruism, teaching, arbitrating in industrial and political disputes, and directing public opinion. They should be scholars, physicians, poets and artists. Indeed all the arts, including dancing and singing should be practiced by them, like bards in ancient societies.

This required long training. They began training from the age of twenty-eight, studying in positivist schools. From thirty-five to forty-two a priest served in an apprentice position as teacher and ritualist. Only at the age of forty-two could he become a full priest. They earned no money and could not hold offices outside the priesthood. In this way their influence was purely spiritual and moral. The High Priest of Humanity was to live in Paris, which would replace Rome as the centre of religion.

== Influence ==
Davies argues that Comte's austere and "slightly dispiriting" philosophy of humanity – viewed as alone in an indifferent universe (which can only be explained by "positive" science) – "was even more influential in Victorian England than the theories of Charles Darwin or Karl Marx".

The system was ultimately unsuccessful but, along with Darwin's On the Origin of Species, it influenced the proliferation of various Secular Humanist organizations in the 19th century, especially through the work of secularists such as George Holyoake and Richard Congreve. Although Comte's English followers, including George Eliot and Harriet Martineau, for the most part rejected the full panoply of his system, they liked the idea of a religion of humanity and his injunction to "vivre pour altrui" ("live for others", from which comes the word "altruism").

Profound criticism came from John Stuart Mill who advocated Comte but dismissed his Religion of Humanity in a move towards a differentiation between the (good) early Comte, the author of The Course in Positive Philosophy and the (problematic) late Comte, who authored the Religion of Humanity. While sympathising with the need for a secular religion, and appreciating Comte's respect for "the Human Race, conceived as a continuous whole, including the past, the present and the future", Mill thought that the details of Comte's ritualism were not only illiberal but "could have been written by no man who had ever laughed".

The social impact of Comte's ideas is hard to fully gauge but examples can be found in history. One of Comte's devoted English followers had been Henry Beveridge. Influenced by his father's ideas, the younger William Beveridge laid the foundations for the welfare state in Britain with a major report, precipitating the creation of the National Health Service.

== Positivist Church of Brazil ==
Comtean Positivism was relatively popular in Brazil. In 1881 Miguel Lemos and Raimundo Teixeira Mendes organized the "Positivist Church of Brazil" after talks with Pierre Laffitte, disciple of Comte and manager of his estate, in Paris. In 1897 the "Temple of Humanity" was created. The services at the Temple could go on for up to four hours and that, combined with a certain moral strictness, led to some decline during the Republican period. Nevertheless it had appeal with the military class as Benjamin Constant joined the group before breaking with it because he deemed Mendes and Lemos as too fanatical. Cândido Rondon's conversion proved more solid as he remained an orthodox Positivist and a member of the faith long after the church's importance waned. The Positivists, religious or not, greatly influenced the Brazilian republicanist movement, and were influential for the abolishment of the monarchy and the Proclamation of the Republic in 1889.

The national flag of Brazil bears the motto "Ordem e Progresso" ("Order and Progress"), inspired by Comte's motto of positivism: "L'amour pour principe et l'ordre pour base; le progrès pour but" ("Love as a principle and order as the basis; progress as the goal"). Although it has declined, the church still survives in Brazil. It has three remaining temples: one in Porto Alegre, one in Curitiba and in Rio de Janeiro.

Comte also influenced the Young Turks political movement.

=== Temples of Humanity ===
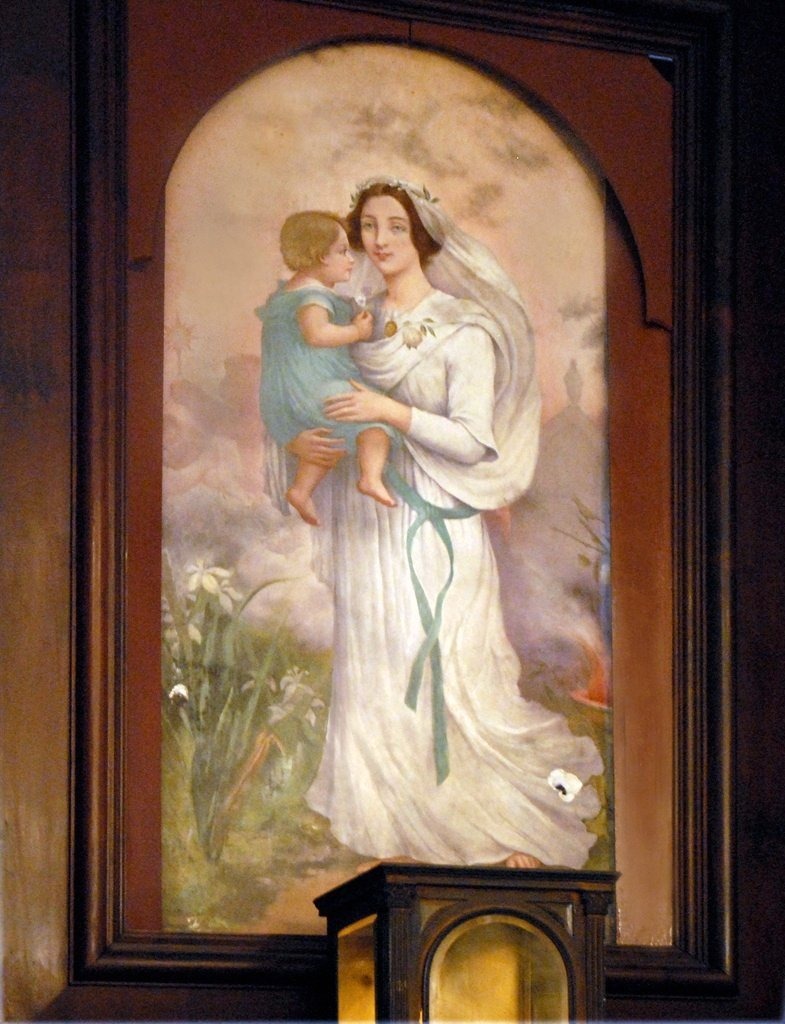
Portrait of de Clotilde de Vaux in the Chapel of Humanity, Paris

- Chapelle de l’Humanité — 5 rue Payenne, Le Marais, Paris (pilgrimage site in honor of Clotilde de Vaux)
- Templo da Humanidade — Rua Benjamin Constant 74, Rio de Janeiro, Brazil (main site)
- Capela Positivista — Avenida João Pessoa 1058, Porto Alegre, Brazil
- Capela Positivista — Rua Riachuelo 90, Curitiba, Brazil

== Other examples ==
There are more examples of Religion of Humanity started by positivists, and there are several authors who have given epithet to the religion they support, whatever the religion. In India Baba Faqir Chand established Manavta Mandir (Temple of Humanity) to spread his religion of humanity with scientific attitude as explained by David C. Lane in a book The Unknowing Sage. Comte influenced the thought of Victorian secularists George Holyoake (coiner of the term "secularism") and Richard Congreve. Rousseau's religion of humanity was distinctly termed Civil religion.

== See also ==
- Christian humanism
- Church of Humanity
- Cult of Minerva
- Cult of Reason
- History of sociology
- Humanism
- Nontheistic religion
- Religious humanism
- Secular humanism
- Sociological positivism
