= Church of Humanity =

Positivist church in England

Church of Humanity was a positivist church in England influenced and inspired by Auguste Comte's Religion of Humanity in France. It also had a branch or variant in New York City, and other locations. Richard Congreve founded the first English Church of Humanity in 1859, just two years after Comte's death. Despite being relatively small the church had several notable members and ex-members. For example, Ann Margaret Lindholm was raised in the Church of Humanity before converting to Catholicism.

The New York City version originates with English immigrant Henry Edger. In 1854 he decided to dedicate himself to the positive faith, just two years after his mentor Congreve in Britain. In 1869 an American organization formed with David Goodman Croly as a leading member. Croly strongly believed in the religious element of Comtism, but was somewhat limited in evangelizing for it. By the 1870s the positivist organization led to an American version of the Church of Humanity. This was largely modeled on the English church. Like the English version it wasn't atheistic and had sermons and sacramental rites. At times the services included readings from conventional religious works like the Book of Isaiah. It was not as significant as the church in England, but did include several educated people unrelated to Croly. Nevertheless, one of the most noted people raised and baptized in the New York Church of Humanity was David Croly's son Herbert Croly. The church of humanity possibly had its greatest impact in Britain.

== Temples of Humanity ==
- Chapel Street Hall — Lamb's Conduit Street, London
- Newton Hall – Fleur-de-lis Court, off Fetter Lane, Fleet Street, London
- Church of Humanity – Upper Parliament Street, Liverpool
- Church of Humanity – Newcastle upon Tyne

== See also ==
- Religion of Humanity, a secular religion proposed by Auguste Comte (1798–1857), the founder of positivist philosophy.
