= Dayal =

Dayal is a name and given name. Notable people with the name include:

- Benny Dayal (born 1984), a UAE born Indian playback singer
- Bhagwat Dayal Sharma or B. D. Sharma (1918–1993), first Chief Minister of Haryana of Independent India
- Bhawani Dayal Arya College, formerly known as Bhawani Dayal High School, a school established in Fiji in 1972
- Dadu Dayal (1544–1603), saint from Gujarat, India
- Data Dayal Maharishi or Maharishi Shiv Brat Lal, born in Bhadohi District of Uttar Pradesh state in India in 1860
- Dau Dayal Joshi, former member of Lok Sabha from Kota
- Dayal Ji or Advaitanand Ji (1846–1919), son of Tulsi Das Ji, born in Pukh, Nakshatra in the province of Bihar, India
- Dayal Padmanabhan (born 1970), Indian film director and producer
- Dayal Thakur (born 1952), Indian classical singer in the North Indian Hindustani music tradition
- Deen Dayal Upadhyaya or Deendayal Upadhyaya (1916–1968), leader of the Bharatiya Jana Sangh, now the Bharatiya Janata Party
- Har Dayal (1884–1939), Indian nationalist revolutionary who founded the Ghadar Party in America
- Ishwar Dayal Mishra, Nepalese politician, belonging to the Tarai Madhes Loktantrik Party
- Ishwar Dayal Swami or I.D. Swami, former union minister of state of India
- John Dayal, (born 1948), Indian Christian activist and self-proclaimed "Dalit rights" activist
- Lala Deen Dayal (1844–1905), Indian photographer
- Manav Dayal I.C.Sharma, spiritual leader of Manavta Mandir Hoshiarpur, Punjab, India
- Manish Dayal, American film and television actor
- Manjula Dayal, Fijian businesswoman
- Param Dayal or Baba Faqir Chand, (1886–1981), Indian master of Surat Shabd Yoga
- Ram Dayal Munda (1939–2011), Indian scholar and regional music exponent
- Ranjit Singh Dayal or Ranjit Singh Dyal (1928–2012), Indian Army general and an administrator
- Sarveshwar Dayal Saxena (सर्वेश्वरदयाल सक्सेना) (1927–1983), Hindi writer, poet, columnist and playwright
- Shankar Dayal (1969 or 1970–2024), Indian film director
- Shankar Dayal Sharma (1918–1999), the ninth President of India serving from 1992 to 1997
- Shankar Dayal Singh (1937–1995), contributor to the society and literature, and politician
- Shiv Dayal Batish (1914–2006), Indian musician born in Patiala, India to a Brahmin family
- Shiv Dayal Singh (1818–1878), Sant Mat guru
- Vishwambhar Dayal Tripathi (1899–1959), Indian lawyer and politician
- Shimbhu Dayal, Founder of Ambedkar jayanti in town Jamshedpura of Uttar Pradesh

Diyal name also found in pashtoon saraiki caste.

== See also ==
- Dau Dayal Institute Of Vocational Education, Agra
- Dayal Bagh, Garden of the Merciful Lord
- Dayal Pur, census town in state of Delhi, India
- Dayal Singh College, Lahore, affiliated to University of the Punjab, Lahore, Pakistan
- Deen Dayal Upadhyay College of physically handicapped
- Deen Dayal Upadhyay Gorakhpur University in Gorakhpur, Uttar Pradesh
- Deen Dayal Upadhyaya College college of the University of Delhi in India
- Kot Dayal Das industrial city in the province of Punjab
- Ram Dayal Joshi or Baidyanath group, pharmaceutical firm specialising in Ayurvedic medicines
- Dadyal
- Diyala (disambiguation)
- Diyale
- Diyallı
- Djali
