= Dyal =

Dyal may refer to:

== People ==
- Bhai Dyal Das (died 1675), early martyr of Sikhism
- Dyal Singh, several people
- Dev Dyal Kushwaha (1936–2018), Indian politician
- Kenneth W. Dyal (1910–1978), American politician
- Mike Dyal (born 1966), American football player
- Ranjit Singh Dyal (1928–2012), Indian Army general and administrator

== Places ==
- Dyal, Florida, United States

== Other uses ==
- DYAL, a station in the Radyo Natin network

== See also ==
- Dayal
- Dial
- Dyall
