= Mark Juergensmeyer =

American sociologist (born 1940)

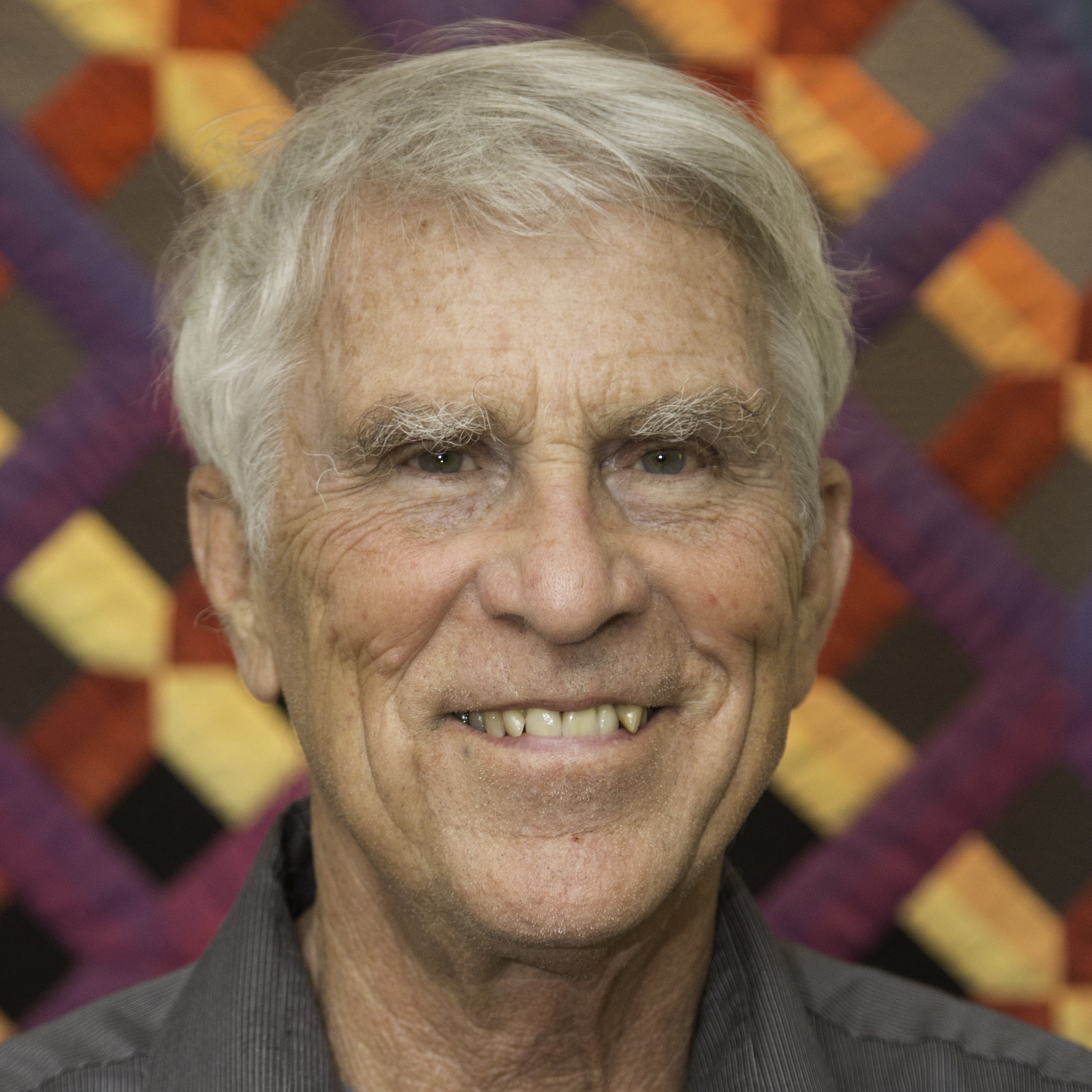
Juergensmeyer in 2015

Mark Juergensmeyer (born 1940 in Carlinville, Illinois) is an American sociologist and scholar specialized in global studies and religious studies, and a writer best known for his studies on comparative religion, religious violence, and global religion. He is Distinguished Professor Emeritus of Sociology and Global Studies at the University of California, Santa Barbara, and William F. Podlich Distinguished Fellow and Professor of Religious Studies at Claremont McKenna College.

Juergensmeyer is regarded as an expert on religious violence, conflict resolution, and South Asian religion and politics and has published thirty books and over 300 articles. He has been a frequent commentator on news programs, especially after 9/11.

== Career ==
Juergensmeyer received a Bachelor of Arts in philosophy from the University of Illinois Urbana-Champaign in 1962, a Master of Divinity from the Union Theological Seminary, New York in 1965, and a Doctor of Philosophy in political science from the University of California, Berkeley in 1974. He has also done graduate work in international relations at the School of International and Public Affairs, Columbia University. He is married to the University of California, Santa Barbara emerita professor Sucheng Chan.

== Publications ==
His early books were on religion and social change in South Asia, including Religion as Social Vision: The Movement Against Untouchability in 20th Century Punjab, and Radhasoami Reality: the Logic of a Modern Faith. With John Stratton Hawley, he co-translated a book of medieval Indian poetry, Songs of the Saints of India. His book on Gandhian conflict resolution was originally published as Fighting with Gandhi and republished as Gandhi's Way: A Handbook of Conflict Resolution.

In the 1990s, he turned toward the issue of religion and violence around the world. The New Cold War? Religious Nationalism Confronts the Secular State was cited by The New York Times as a notable book of the year in 1995. It has been revised and republished as Global Rebellion: Religious Challenges to the Secular State.

In 2001, he published Terror in the Mind of God: The Global Rise of Religious Violence, a comparative study of religious terrorism. It was named as a notable book of the year by The Washington Post. The revised fourth edition was published in 2017. This book introduced the concepts of "cosmic war" and "performance violence" as central to religious-related terrorism.

A book based on a five-year Luce Foundation-funded project surveying the changing role of religion in global society was published as God in the Tumult of the Global Square (co-authored with Dinah Griego and John Soboslai). In 2019, Oxford University Press published a book based on lectures given by Juergensmeyer at Princeton and Muenster, God at War: The Alternative Realities of Religion and War. A five-year project funded by Uppsala University, Sweden, resulted in a publication on how jihadi terrorist movements terminate, When God Stops Fighting: How Religious Violence Ends (2022).

== Positions held ==
Juergensmeyer taught at the University of California, Berkeley for fifteen years in a joint position as coordinator of religious studies for UC Berkeley and director of the Office of Programs in Comparative Religion at the Graduate Theological Union (1974–89); at the University of Hawaiʻi, he was founding dean of the School of Hawaiian, Asian, and Pacific Studies (1989–93); and later, he taught at the University of California, Santa Barbara (1993–2021), where he was founding director of the global and international studies program and the Orfalea Center for Global and International Studies. After retirement, he accepted a temporary position at Claremont McKenna College.

He has also taught at Punjab University, Chandigarh, India, and the University of California, Santa Cruz, and was a research scholar at Guru Nanak Dev University, Amritsar, India. He has been a professor in residence at Emory University, Muenster University in Germany, and the University of Miami.

== Awards and honors ==
Juergensmeyer is the 2003 recipient of the Grawemeyer Award for contributions to the study of religion, and was elected president of the American Academy of Religion for 2008–09. He was a Fellow of the Woodrow Wilson International Center for Scholars in Washington DC in 1988-89 and has been the recipient of fellowships from the American Council of Learned Societies, the Harry Frank Guggenheim Foundation, the U.S. Institute of Peace, and the American Institute for Indian Studies. Juergensmeyer has received honorary doctorate degrees from Lehigh University in Pennsylvania, Dayalbagh Educational Institute in India, and Roskilde University in Denmark, and the Silver Medal from Spain's Queen Sofia Center for the Study of Violence. In 2019, he was named the year's Distinguished Scholar by the Religion and International Affairs section of the International Studies Association.

== See also ==
- Manav Dayal I.C.Sharma
- Bhagat Munshi Ram
- Baba Faqir Chand

== Selected bibliography ==
- When God Stops Fighting: How Religious Violence Ends. Oakland: University of California, Press, 2022.
- Terror in the Mind of God: The Global Rise of Religious Violence. Berkeley: University of California, Press, 2000; fourth ed, 2017. Also in Indian, Spanish, Italian, French, Japanese, German, Russian, and Indonesian editions.
- The New Cold War? Religious Nationalism Confronts the Secular State. Berkeley: University of California Press, 1993. Also in German, Spanish, Indian, Japanese, Indonesian, and Turkish editions. Revised expanded edition published as Global Rebellion: Religious Challenges to the Secular State. Berkeley: University of California Press. 2008. Also in German and Russian editions
- God in the Tumult of the Global Square: Religion in Global Civil Society (with Dinah Griego and John Soboslai). Berkeley: University of California Press, 2015.
- God at War: The Alternative Realities of Religion and War. New York: Oxford University Press, 2020. Also in German edition by Herder Verlag, 2019.
- Fighting With Gandhi. San Francisco: Harper and Row, 1984. Revised edition published as Gandhi's Way: A Handbook of Conflict Resolution. Berkeley: University of California Press, 2005. Also Indian, German, and Chinese editions.
- Songs of the Saints of India. (Co-translator with John Stratton Hawley). New York: Oxford University Press, 1988. Also in Indian edition.
- Radhasoami Reality: The Logic of a Modern Faith. Princeton: Princeton University Press, 1991. Revised expanded edition forthcoming
- Religion as Social Vision: The Movement Against Untouchability in 20th Century Punjab. Berkeley: University of California Press, 1982. Revised India edition published as Religious Rebels in the Punjab: The Ad Dharm Challenge to Caste, Delhi: Navayana Publishing, 2009.
- The Oxford Handbook of Religion (editor). New York: Oxford University Press, 2006.
- Rethinking Secularism (co-editor with Craig Calhoun and Jonathan VanAntwerpen). New York: Oxford University Press, 2011.
- The Oxford Handbook of Global Studies (co-editor with Manfred Steger and Saskia Sassen). New York: Oxford University Press, 2018.
