= Guyum =

Guyum may refer to:

- Güyüm, Azerbaijan
- Guyum, Iran
