= Deyalsingh =

Deyalsingh is a surname. Notable people with the surname include:

- Terrence Deyalsingh (fl. 2013), Trinidad and Tobago politician
- Varma Deyalsingh (fl. 2018), Trinidad and Tobago politician

== See also ==
- Dayal Singh
