= Toghrul (disambiguation) =

Toghrul was the khan of the Keraites and an early ally of Genghis Khan.

Toghrul may also refer to:

== Rulers ==
- Toghrul I (993-1063), founder of the Seljuk Empire
- Toghrul II (1109-1134), sultan of the Seljuk Empire from 1132 to 1134
- Toghrul III (died 1194), last sultan of the Seljuk Empire
- Toghrul of Ghazna, ruler of the Ghaznavid Empire from 1052 to 1053

== Other ==
- Toghrul Asgarov (born 1992), Azerbaijani wrestler and Olympic champion
- Toghrul Omarov (born 1986), Azerbaijani scientist

== See also ==
- Togrul
