= Haji Majid Efendi Mosque =

Mosque in Ismayilli, Azerbaijan

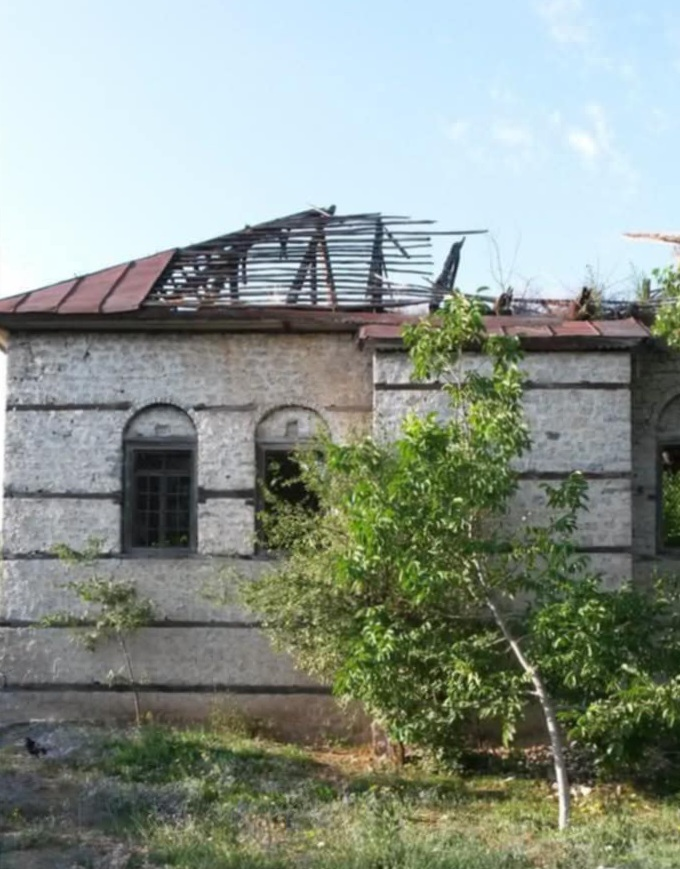

Religion
- Affiliation: Islam
- District: Ismayilli District

Location
- Location: Diyallı
- Country: Azerbaijan
- Interactive map of Haji Majid Efendi Mosque

Architecture
- Completed: 1866

The Haji Majid Efendi Mosque is a mosque in the village of Diyallı, Ismayilli District, Azerbaijan, which was built in 1866.

The mosque was included in the list of locally significant immovable historical and cultural monuments by Decision No. 132 of the Cabinet of Ministers of the Republic of Azerbaijan, dated August 2, 2001.

== About ==
The Haji Majid Efendi Mosque was built in the late 19th century by Haji Majid Efendi in the village of Diyallı. Haji Majid Efendi was born in 1829 in Diyallı. He received religious education in Istanbul, Baghdad, and Tirana. After returning to his homeland, he served as the chief imam of the Shamakhi Juma Mosque, the Shamakhi district qadi (religious judge), and the chairman of the Baku Governorate Muslim Assembly.

After the Soviet occupation of Azerbaijan, an official campaign against religion began in 1928. In December of that year, the Central Committee of the Communist Party of Azerbaijan transferred many mosques, churches, and synagogues to clubs for use in educational and cultural activities. While there were around 3,000 mosques in Azerbaijan in 1917, this number dropped to 1,700 in 1927, 1,369 in 1928, and only 17 by 1933. The Haji Majid Efendi Mosque also ceased its religious function during this period.

== After Independence ==
After Azerbaijan regained its independence, the mosque was included in the list of immovable historical and cultural monuments of local significance by the decision No. 132 of the Cabinet of Ministers of the Republic of Azerbaijan dated August 2, 2001.

In the following years, due to landslides and lack of maintenance, the mosque fell into a state of disrepair.

== Pictures ==
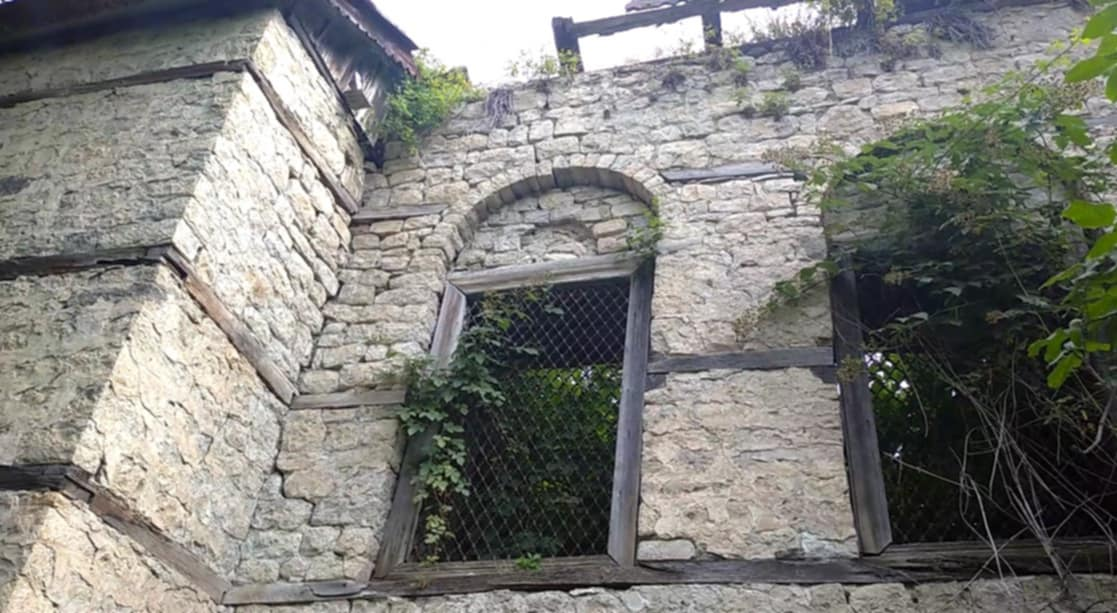

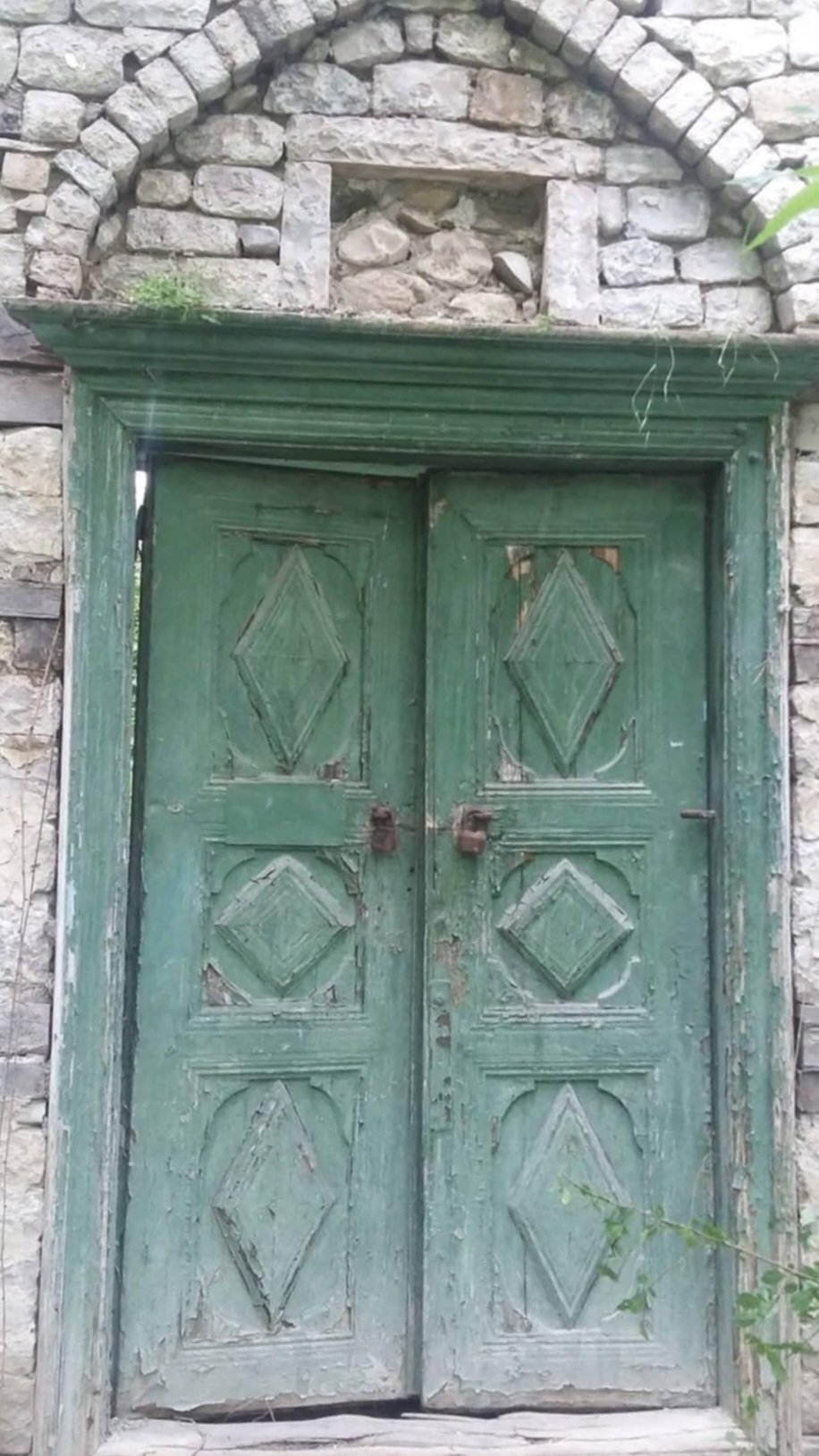

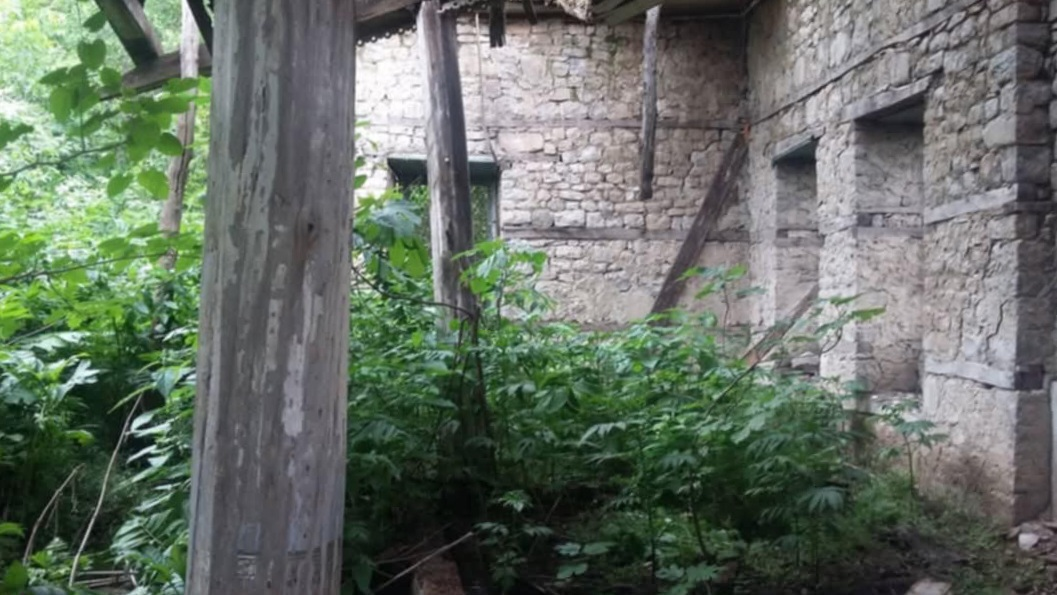

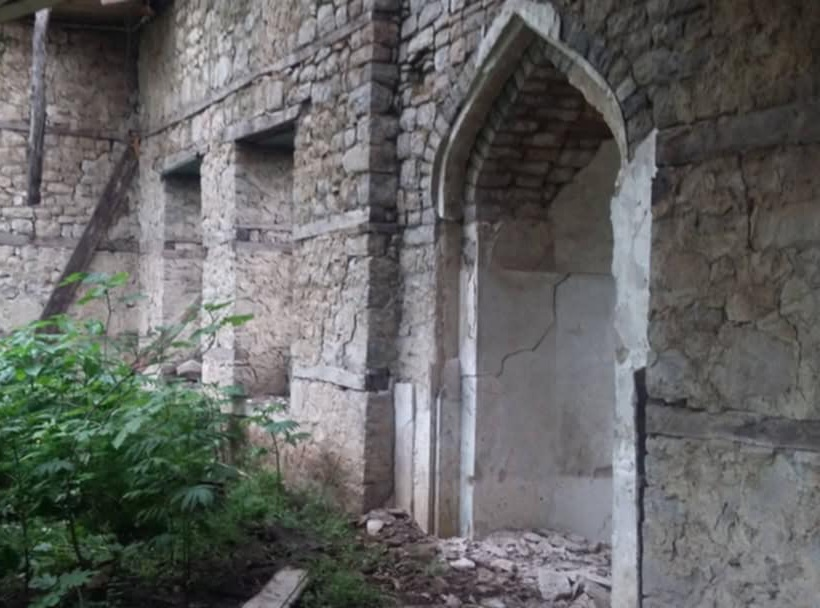

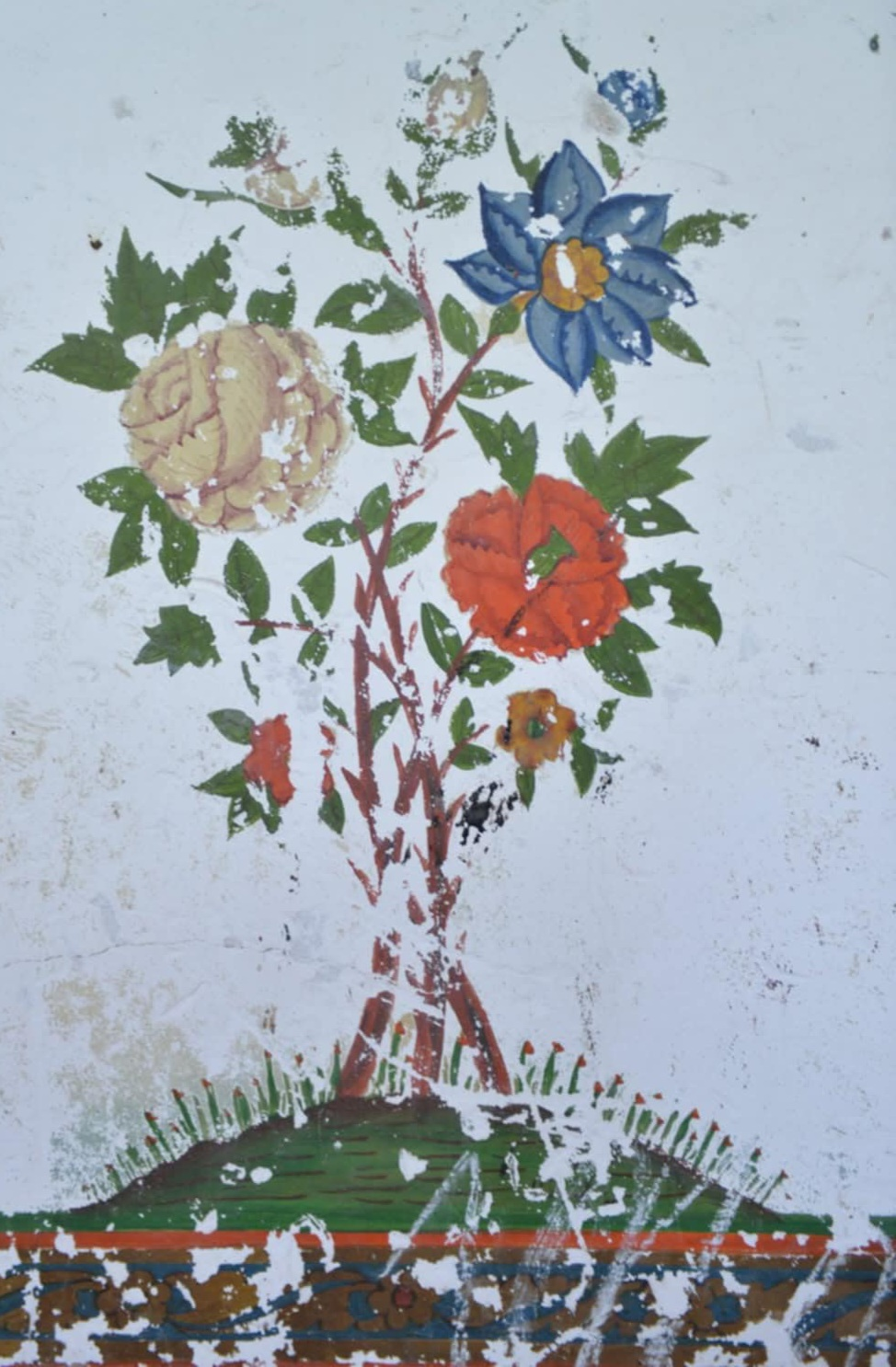

== Sources ==
- Xəlilli, Fariz; Yusifova, Təranə (2018). Mövlanə Hacı Məcid Əfəndi (in Azerbaijani). Baku: Elm və Təhsil nəşriyyatı. p. 48.
- Niyazlı, Babaxan (2014). Mövlanə Hacı Məcid Əfəndi (in Azerbaijani). Baku: Nurlar nəşriyyatı. p. 336.
