= Diala (disambiguation) =

Diala is a species of sea snail.

Diala may also refer to:

- Diala Barakat (born 1980), former member of the cabinet of Syria under Assad
- Diala Makki (born 1981), Iranian-born Lebanese TV host and journalist
- Blessing Diala (born 1989), Nigerian footballer

== See also ==
- Diyala (disambiguation)
