= Togrul =

Togrul is a male name, used mainly in Turkey (Tuğrul) and Azerbaijan (Toğrul), and may refer to:

- Tugrul (993-1063), Seljuk ruler
- Tugrul III (died 1194), Seljuk ruler
- Togrul Narimanbekov (1930-2013), Azeri painter

== See also ==
- Toghrul (disambiguation)
- Tugrul
- Turul
