= Manavta Mandir =

Religious order

- Official emblem of the Manavta Mandir

Religions
- Radha Soami

Website
- http://manavtamandir.com/

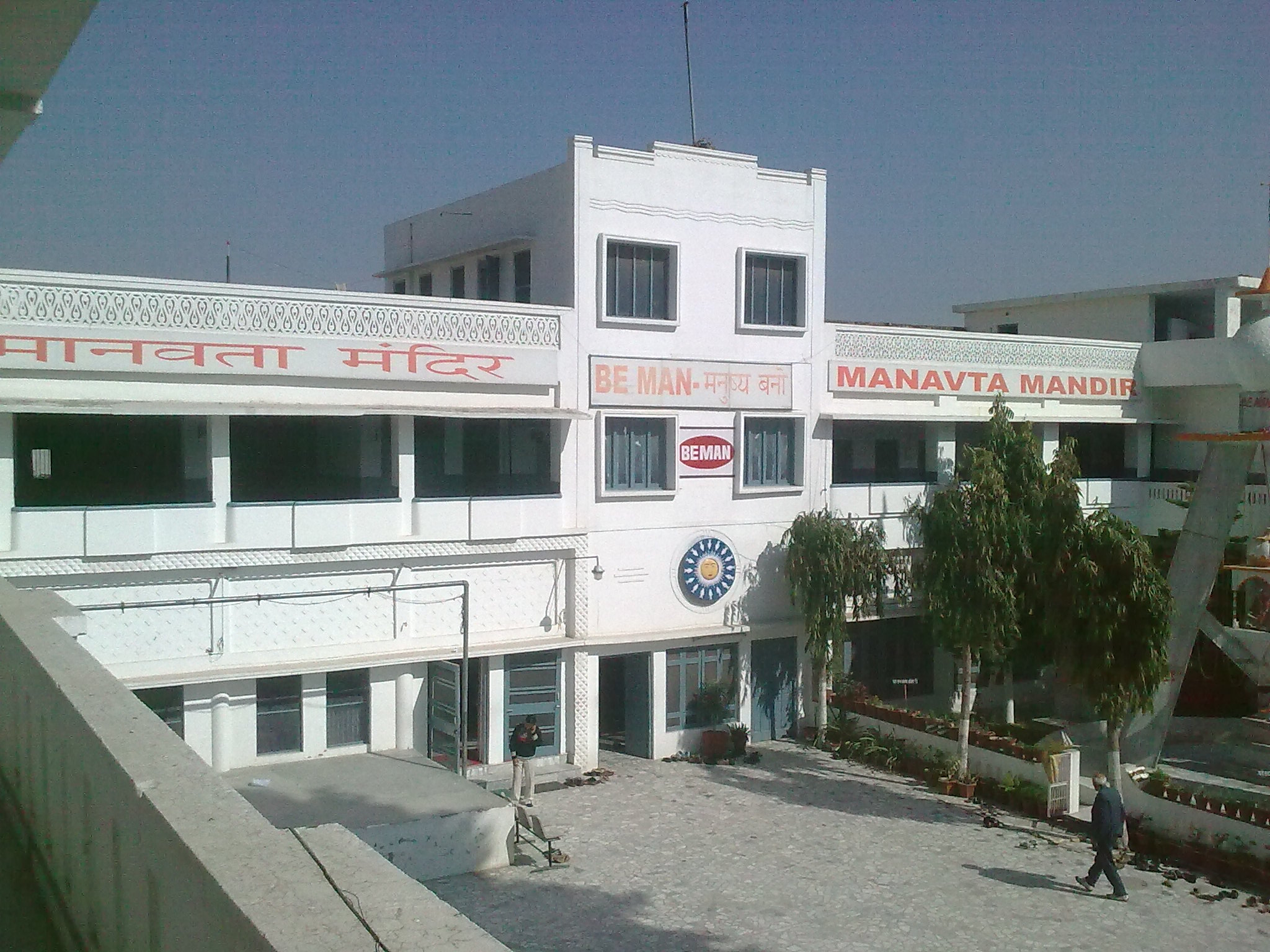
The Manavta Mandir, Hoshairpur, India

Manavta Mandir or Be Human Temple in Hoshiarpur, Punjab, India, was established in 1962 by Baba Faqir Chand (1886–1981) a well known Spiritual master in Radhasoami Sant Mat tradition. In order to carry forward the mission of his religion of humanity, Faqir, with the financial help from Seth Durga Das established the temple which remained his center of activity till he died in 1981. The temple houses a statue of his guru, Shiv Brat Lal and portraits of other prominent gurus of Sant Mat, Radha Soami Mat and Sufi Mat.

== The Mission ==
There is a tomb (Hindi:समाधि) erected in the premises where Faqir's remains (bones) have been interred. A flag of humanity has been unfurled on it. Though, there is no place of 'tomb' etc. in his Sant Mat (Dayal Faqir Mat), however, his last will in this regard intended a message of selfless service to humanity. The Faqir Library Charitable Trust looks after the affairs of the temple. It runs a school named Shiv Dev Rao SSK High School. However, their parents have to give an undertaking to the effect that they will not give birth to more than three children. For the welfare of humanity and nation, thus, Manavta Mandir carries forward the ideology of Faqir to include family welfare programme in the religion itself. A bi-monthly magazine 'Manav Mandir', a priced publication, is another important feature of temple activity. The trust also runs a free dispensary and a free kitchen (Hindi:लंगर). There is a good collection of books in the library maintained by the Trust. It contains a rare book of Shiv Brat Lal, Faqir Chand and many other saints.

== The following ==
The following of Baba Faqir Chand and his followers worldwide is now in lakhs. It also has a small following in United States and Canada.

== Location ==
Manavta Mandir, 'Be Human Temple', Manavta Mandir Road., Hoshiarpur, PIN Code:146001, Punjab, India

== See also ==
- Baba Faqir Chand
- Shiv Brat Lal
- Bhagat Munshi Ram
- Manav Dayal I.C.Sharma
