= Toghrul Omarov =

Azerbaijani scientist (born 1986)

- Born: 3 August 1986 (age 39); Diyallı, Ismayilli, Azerbaijan
- Citizenship: Azerbaijan
- Scientific career
- Fields: Pediatric surgery

Toghrul Iskander ogly Omarov (born 3 August 1986) is an Azerbaijani scientist, pediatric surgeon, pediatric urologist. He is a doctor of philosophy in medicine. He is famous in Azerbaijan for his activities in the field of laparoscopic and thoracoscopic surgery in children. He is the co-author of the laparoscopically assisted igniopuncture extraperitoneal herniorrhaphy method in children with congenital inguinal hernia, which is used globally in medicine, and the invention of laparoscopic igniopuncture extraperitoneal herniorrhaphy for congenital inguinal hernia in children.

== Early life and education ==
Togrul Omarov was born on 3 August 1986 in Diyalli village of Ismayilli district. In 2003–2009, he studied at the Azerbaijan Medical University, then in 2009–2010, he completed an internship at the Kazan State Children's Republican Hospital in Kazan, and in 2011–2014, he received postgraduate studies. In 2013, he completed a refresher course on laparoscopic operations in children at the Bambino Gesu hospital in Rome, Italy. In May 2014, he completed a 10-day advanced laparoscopic pediatric surgery course in Strasbourg, France. In March–April 2016, he participated in a special surgical course at Children's Hospital No. 1 in New York City, US. In 2016, 2017 and 2018, he received a master class in microsurgery and laparoscopy in newborns at Israel's Schneider Children's Medical Center.

In 2016, he defended the scientific work "Improvement of modern surgical methods in congenital inguinal hernias in boys" in Rostov and received the scientific degree of doctor of philosophy in medical sciences.

== Career ==
In 2010–2015, Togrul Omarov worked as a leading pediatric surgeon at Kazan State Children's Republican Hospital. In 2015–2017, he worked at Grand Hospital in Baku, and in 2017–2018 at Medi Style Hospital. Currently, he is the head of the pediatric surgery department at the Baku Health Center.

=== Scientific career ===
Togrul Omarov has acted as a speaker at many different local and international scientific conferences. He is the co-author of the laparoscopically assisted igniopuncture extraperitoneal herniorrhaphy method in children with congenital inguinal hernia, which is used globally in medicine, and the invention of laparoscopic igniopuncture extraperitoneal herniorrhaphy for congenital inguinal hernia in children.
