= Dyall =

Dyall is a surname. Notable people with this surname include:

- Franklin Dyall (1870–1950), English actor
- Karl Dyall (born 1967), Swedish dancer, singer and actor
- Kenneth G. Dyall, chemist known for the Dyall Hamiltonian
- Mary Dyall (née Merrall; 1890–1973), English actress
- Sharon Dyall (born 1962), Swedish singer, actress and voice actress
- Valentine Dyall (1908–1985), English actor and voice actor

== See also ==
- Dyal
