= Sədiyan =

Coordinates: 40°47′N 48°15′E

Sədiyan is a (Hamlet) village situated in the north of the municipality of Diyallı in the Ismailli Rayon of Azerbaijan.
