= Diyala =

Diyala (transliterated from the Arabic ديالا) may refer to:

- Diyala River
- Diyala Governorate
- Diyala FC

== See also ==
- Diala (disambiguation)
