= Diala Makki =

Diala Makki (born September 17, 1981) is a media personality, TV host, and journalist.

== Early life and education ==
Makki was born on September 17, 1981, in Tehran, Iran and was raised in Beirut. She began modeling at 16. Makki studied media at the Lebanese American University, where she earned a Bachelor of Arts in Communication Arts with a focus on Radio, TV, and Film. While studying her master's degree in International Affairs, she worked as a presenter for Future Television.

== Career ==
As a presenter at Future Television, Makki was involved in the launch of the youth channel Zen TV, where she hosted a weekly fashion show. In 2004, she joined Dubai TV, where she and her team launched Studio 24, a weekly entertainment show. During her time there, she covered major film festivals, including Cannes, Venice, and Berlin film festivals.

From 2009 to 2011, Makki hosted two seasons of Najm Al Khaleej, the Gulf version of American Idol, and also hosted Taratata, the biggest Arabic music talk show. She later appeared in two films directed by Ali F. Mostafa: La Tahkom Ala Mowdao Min Khelal Al Sora in 2013 and Rise in 2014.

In 2015 and 2016, Makki was featured in Arabian Business magazine's list of the 100 Most Powerful Arabs Under 40.

Currently, Makki hosts Mashaheer, a prime time fashion documentary lifestyle show on Dubai TV.

== Philanthropy ==
Makki launched a campaign against domestic violence through her social media platforms, actively following up on cases to provide support and connect them with regional NGOs in their respective countries. She also collaborated with Marie Claire Arabia to raise funds from luxury shoe sales, with the proceeds going directly to local NGOs in Dubai. She also attended the CSW62 organized by the UN Women at the United Nations Headquarters in New York, where she participated in a campaign to raise awareness about violence against women.
