= Maharishi Shiv Brat Lal =

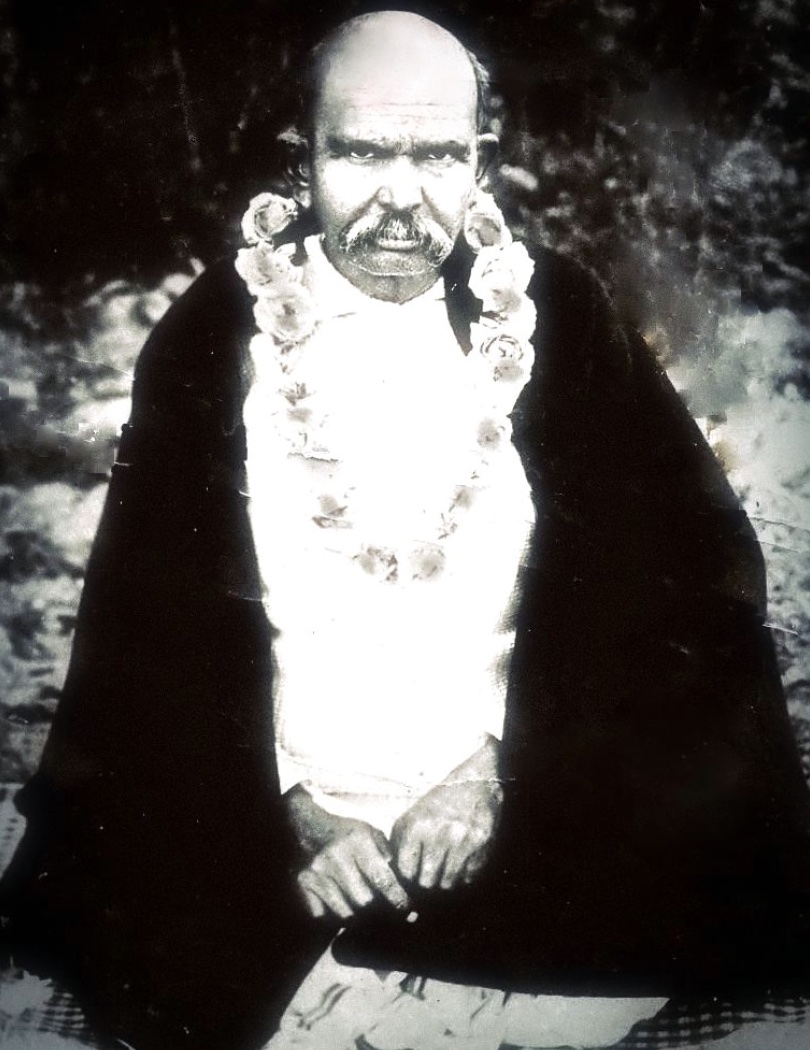

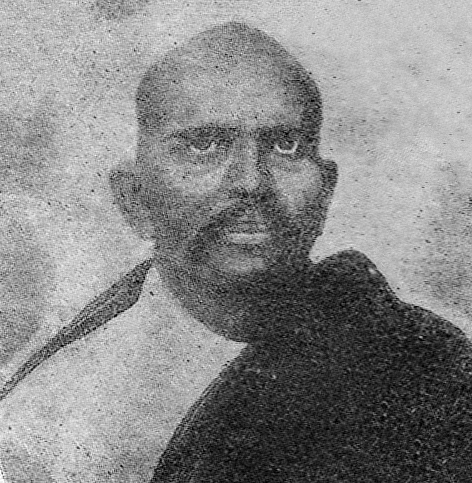
Shiv Brat Lal Verman

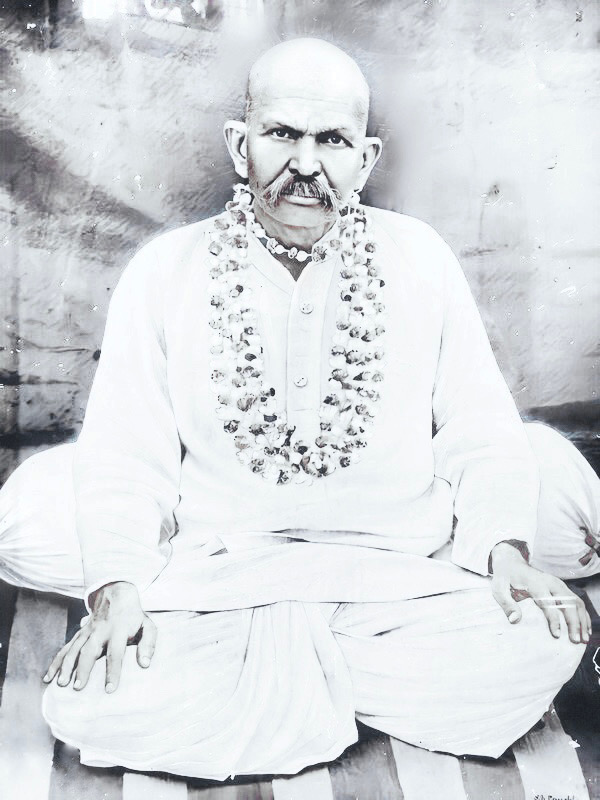

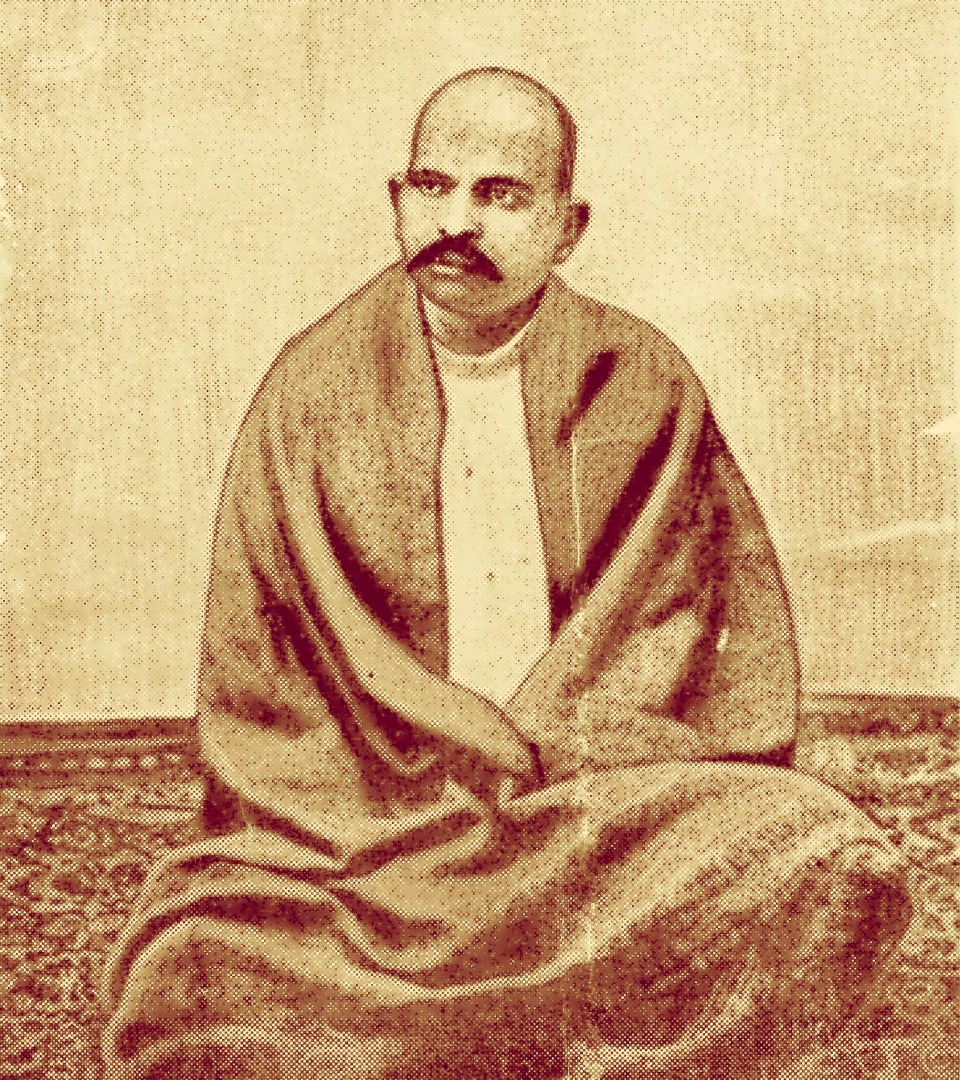
Shiv Brat Lal Verman

Shiv Brat Lal Verman (1860–1939), popularly known by the honorifics "Data Dayal" (Merciful) and "Maharishi" (Great Sage), was a Spiritual master and Sant in Radhasoami tradition who was born in Bhadohi district of Uttar Pradesh state in India in February 1860. He was a post graduate and a famous writer. It is believed that he wrote as many as 3,000 books on various social, historical, religious and spiritual topics. Being a famous writer he was called as the modern Maharishi Ved Vyas and hence became famous with the name Maharishi ji.

== Writings ==
As an editor he moved to Lahore to edit the 'Arya Gazette' - an Urdu weekly. On 1 August 1907 he started his own magazine, Sadhu, and it acquired popularity very quickly. He became a famous writer and in his lifetime he edited and authored almost 3000 spiritual periodicals and books in Hindi, Urdu & English on various social, historical, religious and spiritual topics. His books Light on Anand Yoga, Dayal Yoga and Shabd Yoga became very famous. He left the body on February 23, 1939.

Maharishi's books on the Radha Soami spiritual movement include:

1. Light on Anand Yoga (English)
2. Dayal Yoga
3. Shabd Yoga
4. Radhaswami Yog: Part 1-6
5. Radhaswami Mat Parkash
6. Adbhut Upasana Yog: Part 1-2
7. Anmol Vichar
8. Dus Avtaron Ki Katha
9. Kabir Prichaya Adyagyan
10. Kabir Yog: Part 1-13
11. Kabir Bijak: Part 1-3
12. Karam Rahshya
13. Nanak Yog: Part 1-3
14. Panth Sandesh
15. Safalta Ke Sadhan
16. Sahaj Yog
17. Saptrishi Vartant
18. Sharanangati Yog
19. Satsang Ke Aath Vachan
20. Vayvahar Gyan Parkash
21. Vicharanjali
22. Vigyan Ramayana (Urdu)
23. Vigyan Krishnayana (Urdu)

== Missionary ==
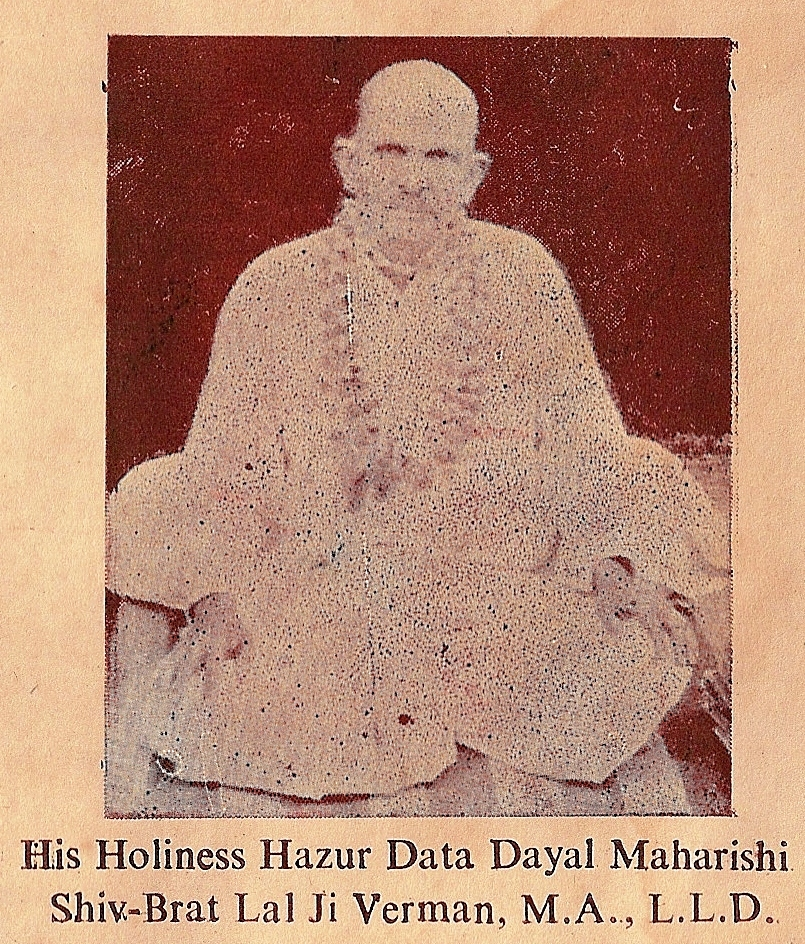
Maharishi Shiv Brat Lal Verman Maharaj

To spread the Radha Soami spiritual movement, Maharishi began a long journey from Lahore to Calcutta on 2 August 1911. He then left Calcutta, proceeding towards Rangoon by sea. He reached Penang on 31 October and Hong Kong on 22 November, via Singapore and Java. After that he went to Japan and later he went to San Francisco in America, where he delivered two lectures.

== Ashram ==
In 1912 Maharishi founded his ashram in Gopi Ganj in Mirzapur, Uttar Pradesh, India. His discourses attracted seekers of the Radha Soami movement from all over the India and abroad. He left for the "Radha Swami Dham" on 23 February 1939 at the age of seventy-nine. His holy Samādhi stands at Radha Swami Dham, near Gopi Ganj.

Among those who continued his work was Baba Faqir Chand of Hoshiarpur and Param Sant Ram Singh Ji Arman of Jui, Haryana.

== See also ==
- Bhagat Munshi Ram
- Baba Faqir Chand
- Manav Dayal I.C.Sharma
- Manavta Mandir
- Shiv Dayal Singh
- Rai Saligram
