= Manjula Dayal =

Fijian businesswoman

Manjula Dayal is a businesswoman from Fiji. In 2017 she won Woman of the Year at the Women in Business Awards.

== Life ==
In 1990 Dayal started working in her husband's family business, M R Dayal & Sons, and in 1994 the couple co-founded Dayals Sawmillers. In 1998 they established a new sawmill in Ba. In 2005, they started a water bottling business which they sold in 2014.
