= Baba Faqir Chand =

Indian spiritual guru (1886-1981)

Param Dayal Faqir Chand Ji Maharaj
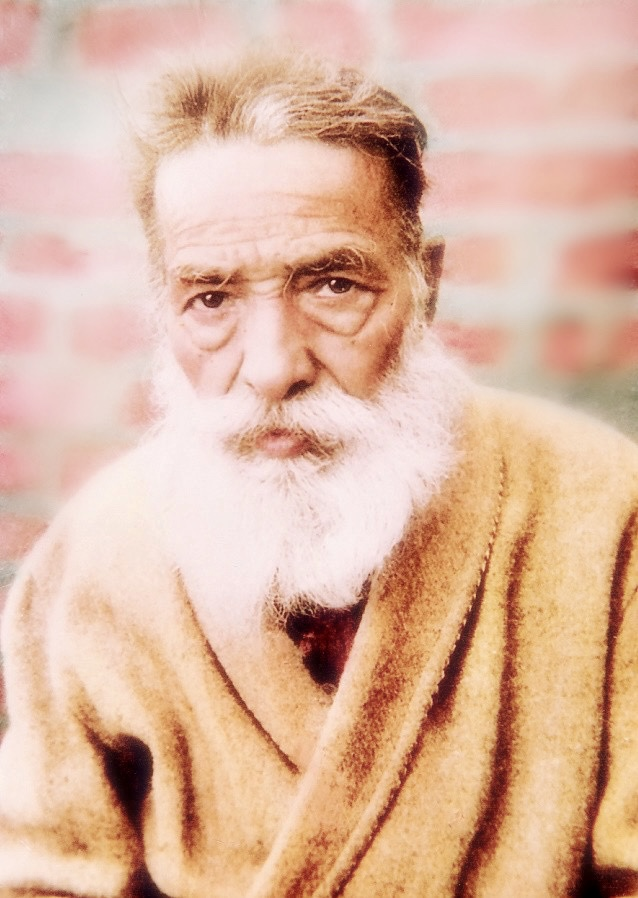

Personal life
- Born: Faqir; 18 November 1886 Panjhal, Hoshiarpur District, Punjab, India
- Died: 11 September 1981 (aged 94) Pittsburgh, Pennsylvania, U.S.A
- Resting place: Manavta Mandir, Hoshiarpur
- Notable work(s): Numerous books and lectures

Religious life
- Religion: A true saint with no religion
- Temple: Manavta Mandir
- Order: Radha Soami Mat
- Lineage: Sant Mat

Senior posting
- Teacher: Data Dayal Maharishi Shiv Brat Lal Verman Ji Maharaj

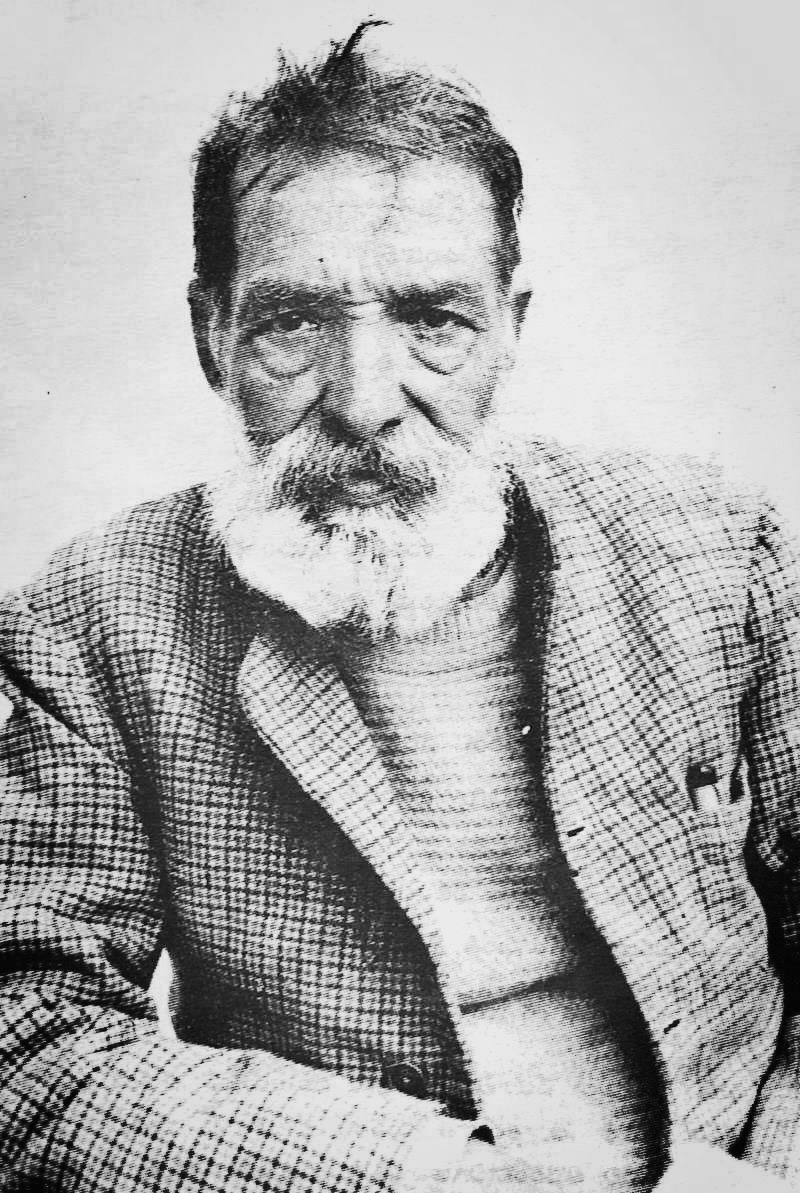
Faqir Chand

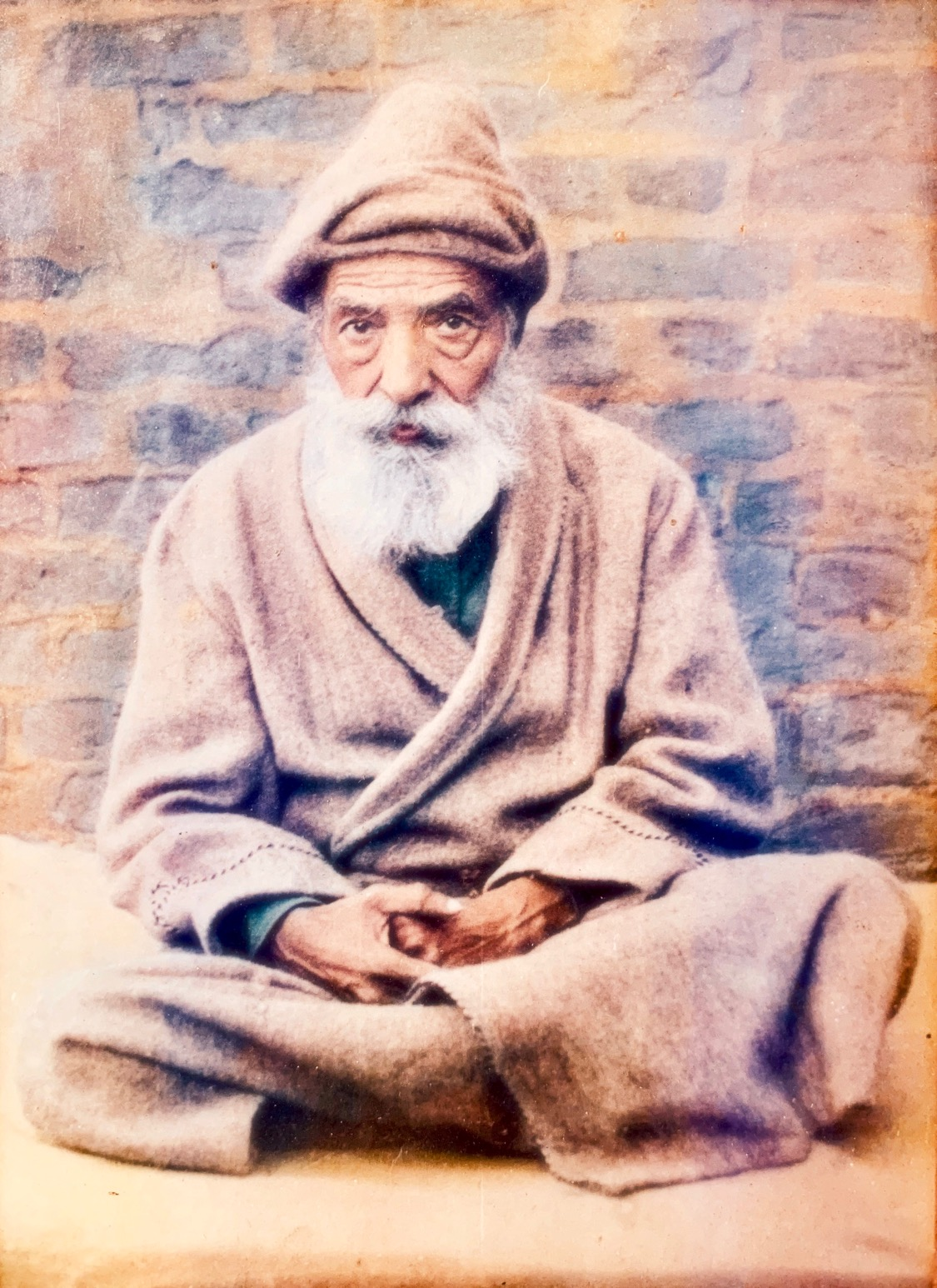

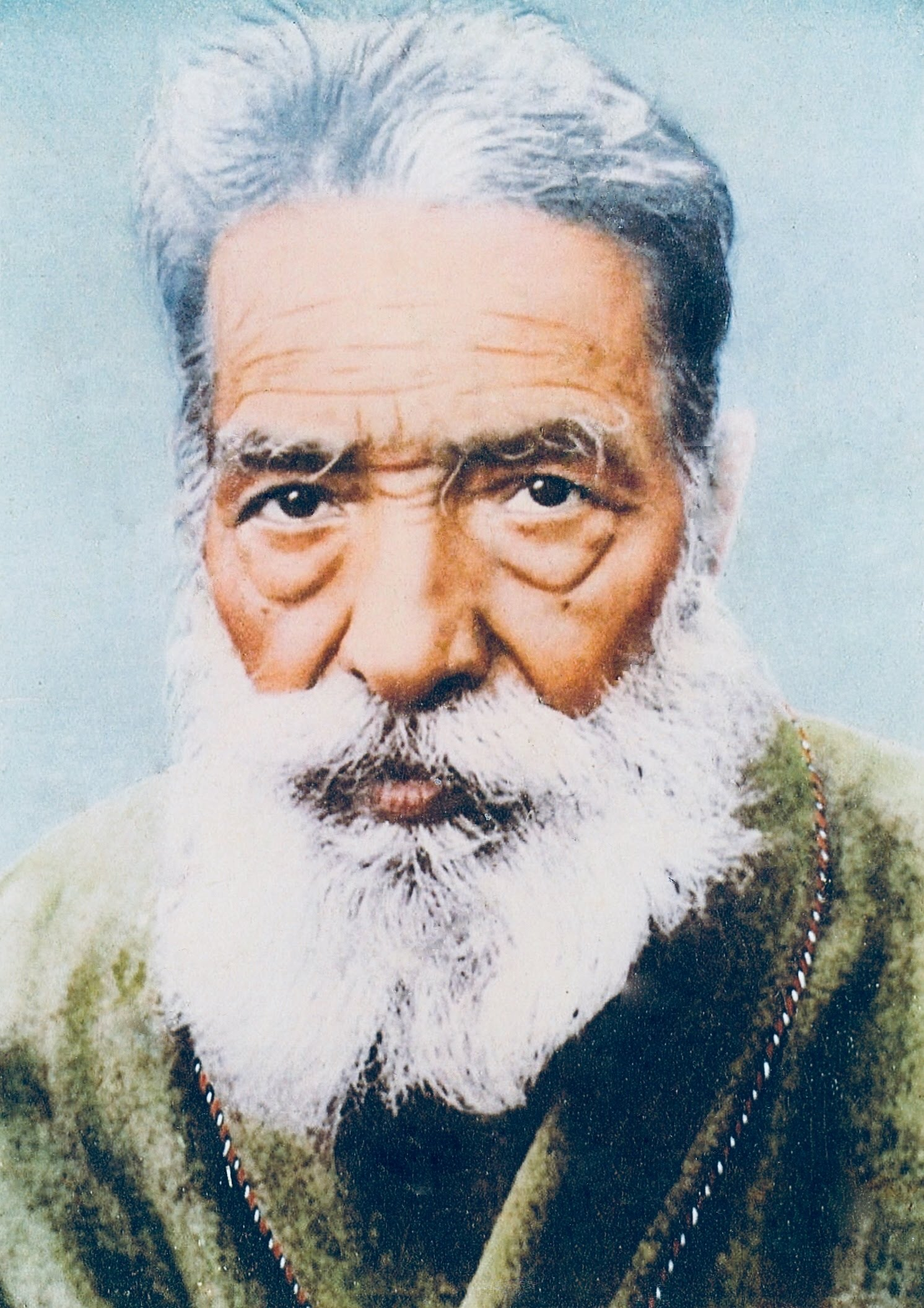

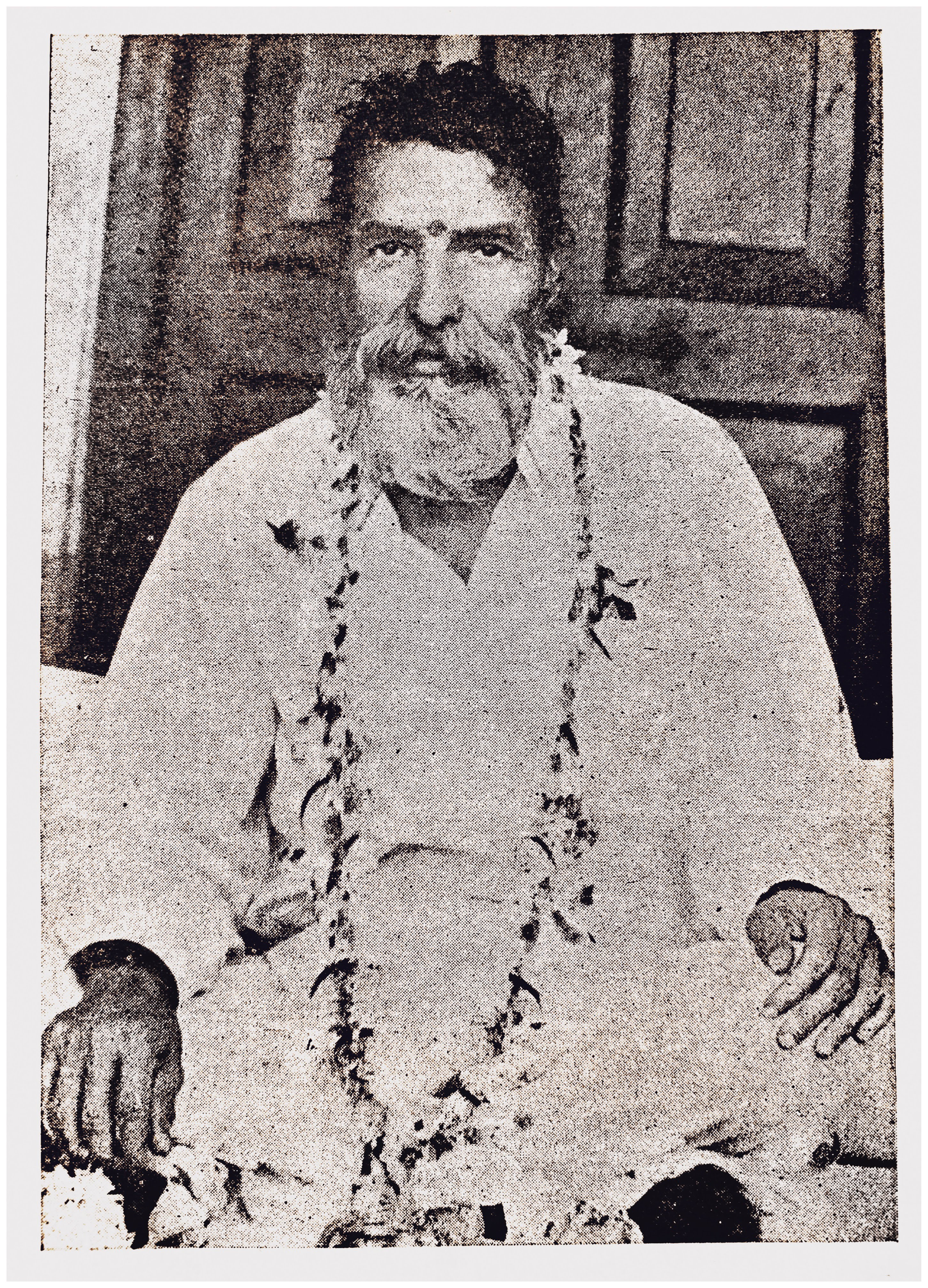

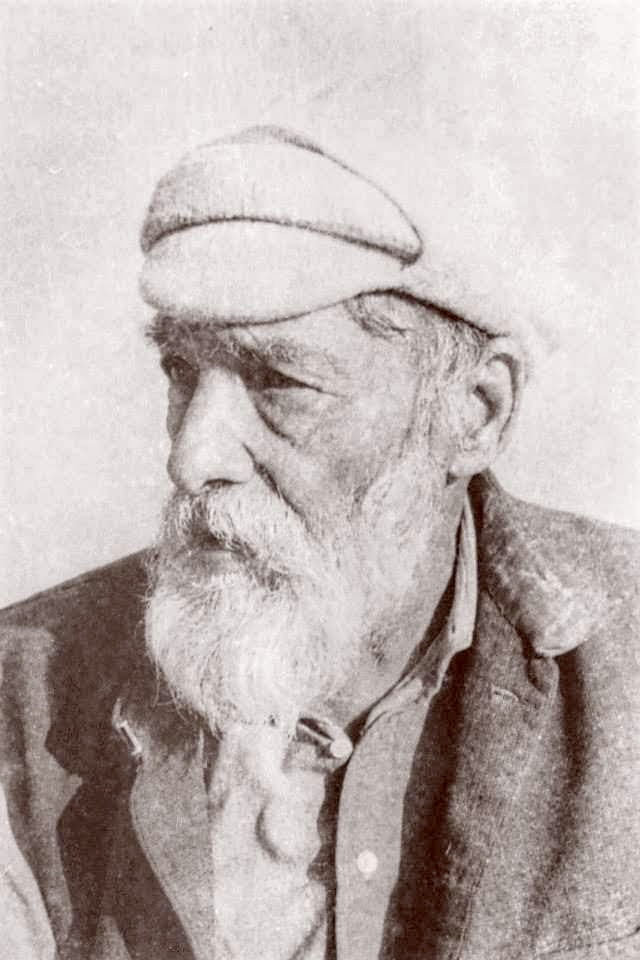

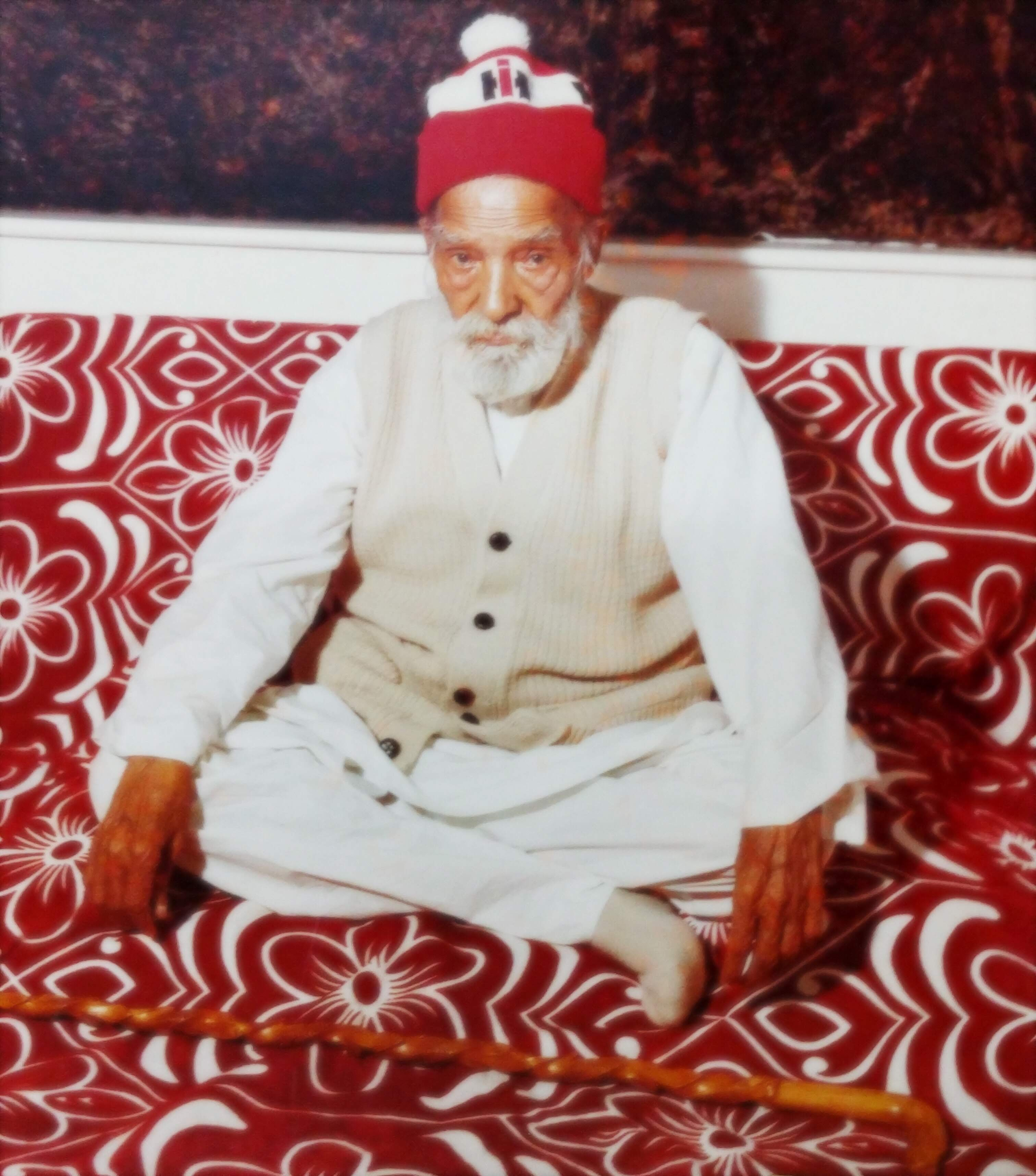

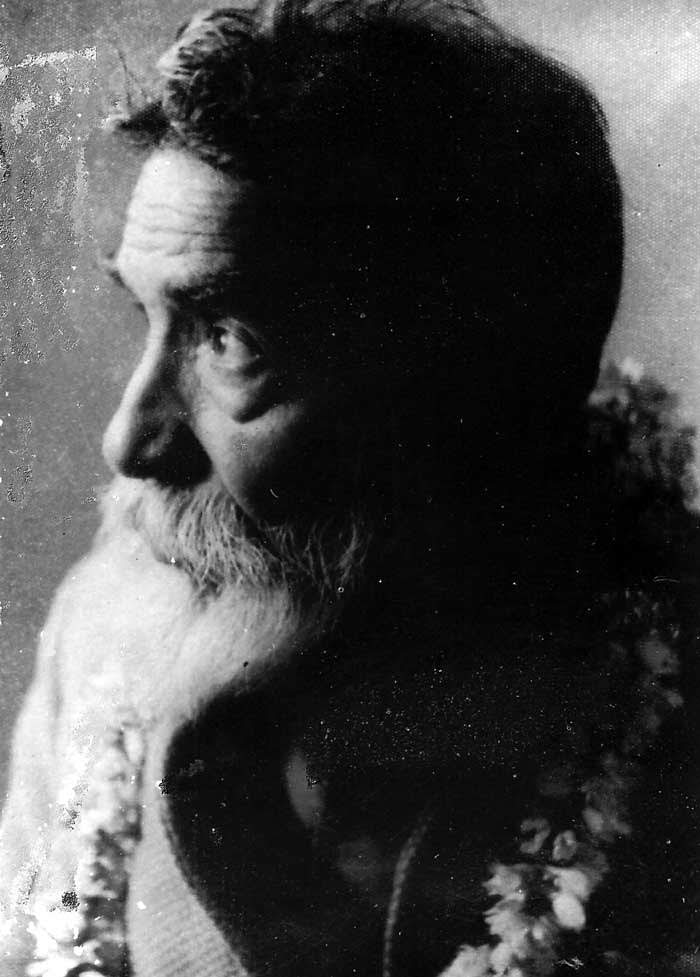

Baba Faqir Chand (18 November 1886 – 11 September 1981) was an Indian spiritual Guru in Radhasoami Sant Mat tradition and master of Surat Shabd Yoga, or consciously controlled near death experience. He was one of the first saints or gurus of Sant Mat tradition to openly speak and write against the deceptive and harmful practices of modern guruism and religious intolerance. As a highly pragmatic individual, Faqir also strove to explain the various practices and principles of Sant Mat based on his own experiences and in the context of modern science and psychology. He was also the first Sant Mat guru to talk about the phenomena consisting of a believer experiencing a subjective projection of a sacred or holy form of a guru or idol without the conscious knowledge of the person at the center of the experience, i.e., the guru. This was termed the 'Chandian Effect', and described by researcher David C. Lane. Faqir Chand claimed that he had no knowledge of his form manifesting before a person and helping them with their worldly or spiritual problems. He fervently expressed that in his experience, the real helper is one's own true self and faith. Mark Juergensmeyer, another researcher on new religious movements (including Radha Soami Mat), intrigued by the uniqueness of Faqir Chand's experiences, also interviewed him. This insightful interview was included in Faqir's autobiography.

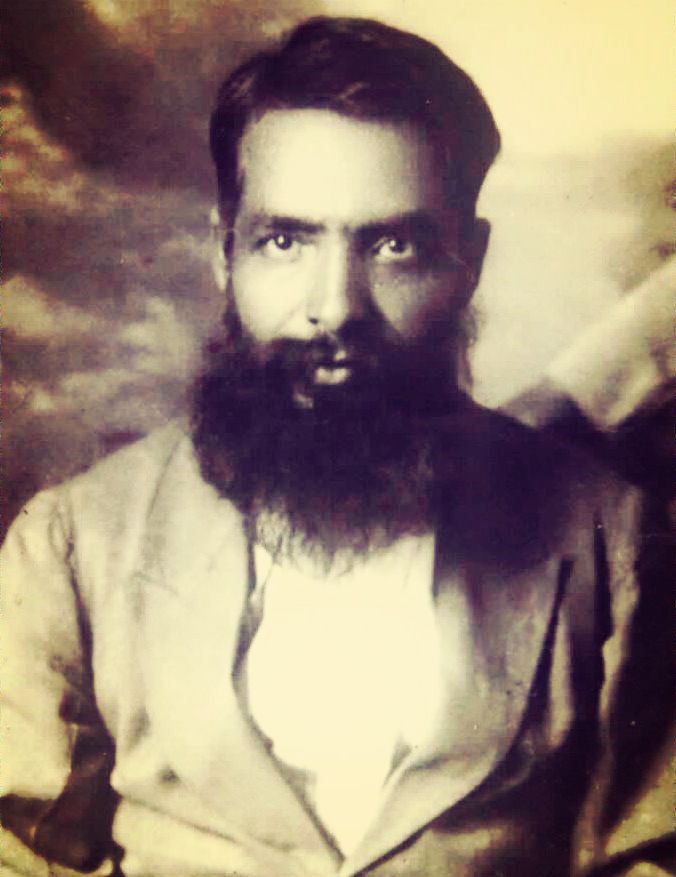
Faqir Chand near the end of 1918 upon returning to India from Baghdad (where he was posted during World War I)

== Life ==
Baba Faqir Chand was born on 18 November 1886 in village of Panjhal, located in the Hoshiarpur district of Punjab, India. He was brought up in a poor Hindu Brahmin family, and his father was a policeman. As a result, he sought relief in worship of God (Bhakti). At young age, against his family traditions, he became non-vegetarian for some time. Later, his repentance and prayers took him to Radha Soami Mat through a divine vision of Data Dayal Shiv Brat Lal Ji Maharaj. He initiated Faqir Chand into Radha Soami Mat and gave him a book, Saar Vachan, written by Shiv Dayal Singh the founder of Radha Soami Mat. He soon found that the book's positions on various religious movements were contrary to his own impressions and beliefs. However, because of his unshakable faith in Data Dayal Ji he took a vow and honestly followed the path shown by his guru. Faqir Chand started delivering discourses (Satsang) to his followers only after Shiv Brat Lal died. Among these discourses was his experienced belief that the images and visions (including holy forms, colors and lines, etc.) that seemed to appear to his followers during meditation were only Maya or illusions and did not represent truths as such.

After 1942 Faqir Chand discontinued the traditional practice of Nam-Dan, (a form of baptism). Instead, he preached that the description of the higher stages of inner knowledge by an experienced person was Nam Dan. He performed all the duties of a guru without becoming one. In literature, there is mention of miraculous and divine appearances of his form to the followers in need and distress. But Faqir Chand disassociated himself from all such miracles saying it had happened for the faith of believers and not him. He declared all such followers his Satguru (the teller of true knowledge) because their experiences regarding appearing of his holy form compelled him to think as to who helped them while he had no knowledge of those incidents. Those were projections of mind, he concluded. Such experiences facilitated him to go beyond mind, soul (light) and inner sound current. This lead him to self-realization and eternal peace. His craving for ultimate truth ended. In 1980, in view of his failing health, and at the request of David Christopher Lane, a professor of philosophy in California, Faqir Chand dictated his autobiography to Prof. B.R. Kamal. Originally written in Urdu, it was translated into English by Prof. Kamal and later edited and published by Dr. Lane.

Baba Faqir Chand died on 11 September 1981 in Pittsburgh, while touring the United States. Through his will, he established a separate entity for Manavta Mandir, Hoshiarpur, keeping it separate and independent of other Manavta centers. He also made it clear that the trust of Manavta Mandir had no relation other than that of love with Manavta centers (opened in his name) and their preachers within the country and abroad. Faqir allowed his blood relations to serve the temple but prohibited them from becoming members of the trust and interfering with Temple affairs. His mission ('Be Man') was included in his last will. He appointed Munshi Ram Bhagat to give Nam Dan, instruct the souls and help distressed and perturbed people. He also co-appointed Manav Dayal I.C.Sharma, a professor of philosophy, and an experienced soul with great spiritual knowledge and practice to work in his (Faqir Chand's) place in absence or presence of Munshi Ram Bhagat. Under the terms of his will, no fee is charged for studying in school run by Manavta Mandir. But, Faqir made it compulsory for parents of wards to give an undertaking which restricted them from giving birth to more than three children.

His remains are interred in the premises of Manavta Mandir with flag of 'Be Man' mission unfurled upon them. He further clarified that his saintism excluded places of veneration of the dead, graves, tombs and worship of deceased great people. Therefore, he kept himself disassociated with 'Shiv Smadh' (tomb of Data Dayal Shiv Brat Lal).

== Religious and spiritual views ==
Faqir's beliefs drew from many sources, including his long association with Radha Soami Mat and his experience in Surat Shabd Yoga. Faqir found much to agree with in their humanitarian approaches, but disagreed with the traditional Nam-Dan and the prevalent guruism in India. He had very little tolerance for religious practices leading to exploitation of poor, innocent and believing people. As shown in his written works, he saw himself as an ardent follower of Sant Mat and Radha Soami Mat, but was disillusioned with ultimate outcome of higher stages of Surat Shabd Yoga and mysticism nourished by Saints. He declared that the ultimate goal of Sant Mat was spiritual, mental and physical peace and not an imagined spiritually exalted stage. His emphasis later shifted from Yogic practices to the humanism of Sant Mat.

Faqir also believed in the idea that sex was best used for the purpose of begetting children; bringing these children into the world would then work to reduce the sufferings of human race. His philosophy of life looked to the welfare of both the self and of others. For internal peace, he advised young people to remain busy, earn a livelihood, observe self-restraint, and to remain under the guidance of an honest and truthful person. As a part of social duty he asked his followers not to intentionally hurt others, avoid purposeless talk, be tolerant to bitter words, and to serve fellow beings selflessly.

He laid special emphasis on 'home peace' in all respects. Pious deeds, pious earnings, and charity (which includes affection and welfare) were other aspects covered by him under social behavior, and which he considered to be essential for humans. In other spiritual practices he underlined love, devotion, faith, and dedication. Frequently, he taught his followers to be true to themselves and surrender to God. To concentrate one's mind he recommended repeating a holy name or mantra, meditating on any holy form. He explained that the purpose of such yogic techniques was to still or quiet the mind by allowing it to focus on one thought or image. He maintained that the ultimate purpose of spiritual quest was to realize one's own true Self and abide in it. In a lecture on self-realization, he shared that the Radha Swami state was none other than realization of the true Self, which is beyond name and form.

He noticed that all beings were bubbles of super most conscious element and ultimate goal of humans was peace.

== Manavta Mandir ==
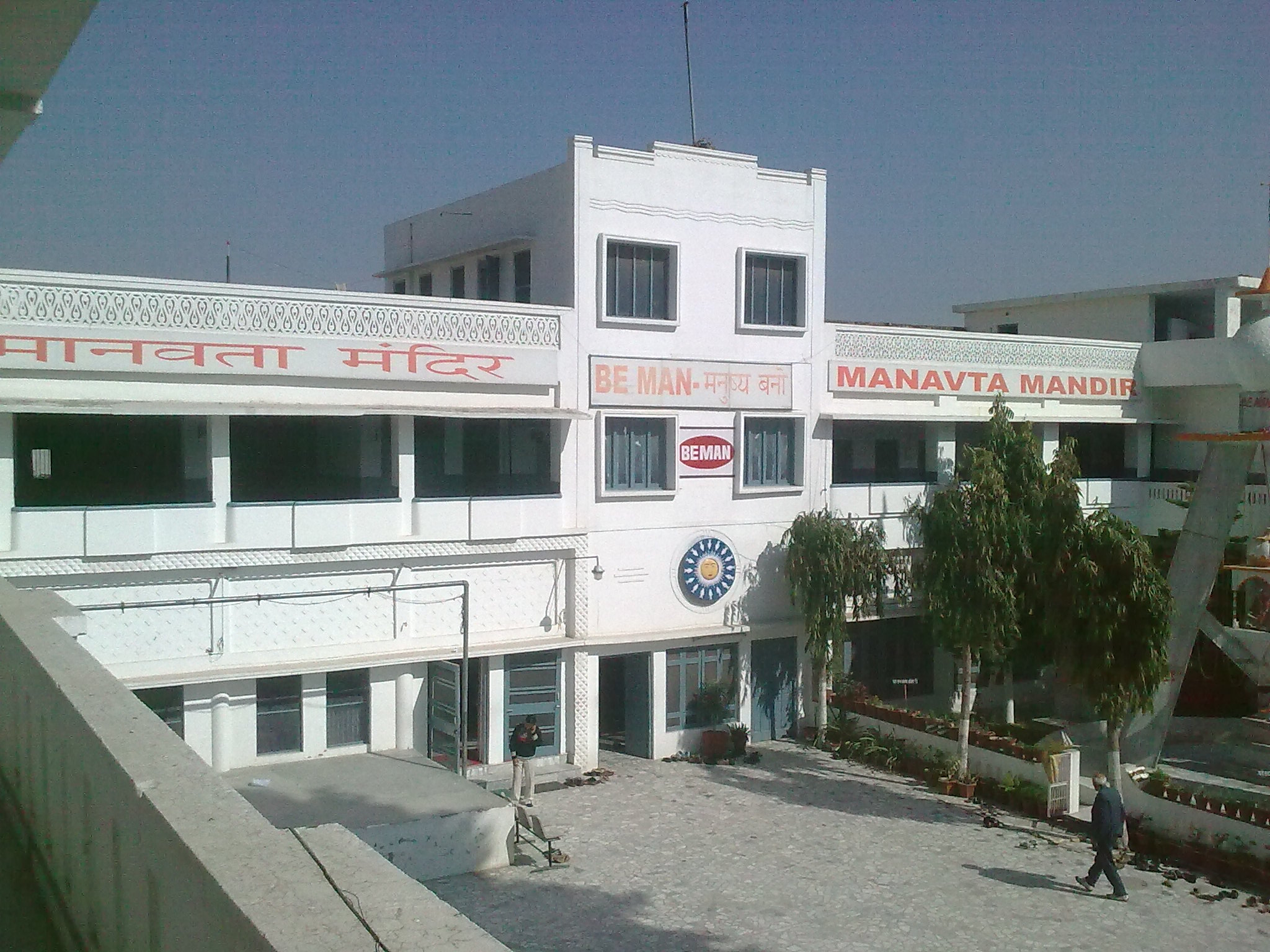
The Manavta Mandir, Hoshairpur

Data Dayal, in the year 1933, directed him to change the traditional mode of preachings of Sant Mat. For fulfilling guru's wish and carry forward his mission according to changed time, in the year 1962, Faqir established Manavta Mandir (Temple of Humanity) in Hoshiarpur. Publication of a monthly magazine, Manav Mandir, was started. The temple was dedicated to humanity and its religion. Manavta Mandir became center of his mission where he continued to tell people the truth of miracles (mysterious functioning of mind) and also about the truth beyond mind. He did it at the cost of donations and offerings required to maintain Manavta Mandir.

== Other prominent followers and colleagues ==
Baba Faqir Chand had a wide array of colleagues and followers, both during and after his lifetime. These include his colleague or Guru bhai, Pir-e-Mughan (Pandit Bua Ditta) (Delhi), Nandu Bhai (Nizamabad, Andhra Pradesh), P.Anand Rao (Hyderabad, Andhra Pradesh), Gopi Lal Krishak, Prithvi Nath (J&K), Lal Chand (Churu, Rajasthan), B.R. Kamal Karm Chand Kapur (Palampur, Himachal Pradesh), Hukam Singh, Annadata, Jaswant Singh, Tara Singh Shri Dayal Singh Kataria etc.

== Works or publications ==
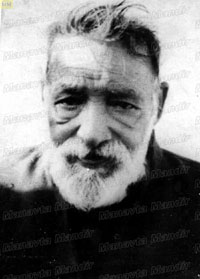

At a young age Faqir wrote many books in Urdu which were later translated into Hindi (Devanagari). Most of his books were direct compilations of his Satsangs published in two magazines namely 'Manushya Bano' (published from Aligarh) and 'Manav Mandir' (the later published by Manavta Mandir Trust, Hoshiarpur established by him). His Hindi books include :

- Jagat Ubhar
- Garud Puran Rahasya
- Ajayab Purush
- Panch Nam Ki Vyakhya
- Meri Dharmik Khoj
- Barah Masa Ki
- Kabir Sar Shabd Vyakhya
- Sat Kabir Ki Sakhi Vyakhya
- Guru Tattva
- Prem Rahasya
- Guru Mahima
- Manavta Yug Dharm
- Unnati marg
- Ishwar Darshan
- Guru Vandana
- Sat Gyan Data
- Saar Ka Saar
- 50 Years of experience of Faqir
- Hriday Udgar
- Agam Vikas
- Akaashiya Rachna
- Yatharth Sandesh
- Sachchai
- Agam Vani
- Manav Dharm Prakash
- Adi Ant
- Gyan Yog
- Nirvan Se Pare
- Naam Daan
- Saar Bhed
- Karm Bhog Ya Mauj
- The Essence of Truth
- Satya Sanatan Dharm or True Religion of Humanity

Books (translated) in English include:

- A Word to Americans
- A Word to Canadians
- The Art of Happy Living

== Titles ==
Baba Faqir Chand was called by various names during his life by his devotees. These titles reflected devotees' love and veneration for him. These names include: Dayal Faqir, Param Dayal Ji Maharaj, Sant Satguru Param Dayal Ji, Baba Faqir, Faqir Chand Ji Maharaj, Hazoor Maharaj and Sant Satguru Waqt Faqir Chand Ji Maharaj.

== See also ==
- Manavta Mandir
- Rai Saligram
- Maharishi Shiv Brat Lal
- Manav Dayal I.C.Sharma
- Bhagat Munshi Ram
- Sant Tarachand
- Secular humanism
- Religious humanism
- Christian humanism
