= Güyüm =

- Location within Azerbaijan
- Coordinates: 40°47′N 48°13′E
- Country: Azerbaijan
- Rayon: Ismailli
- Municipality: Diyallı
- Time zone: UTC+4 (AZT)
  - Summer (DST): UTC+5 (AZT)

Güyüm (also, Gyugyum) is a village in the Ismailli Rayon of Azerbaijan. The village forms part of the municipality of Diyallı.
