= Bhagat Munshi Ram =

Munshi Ram
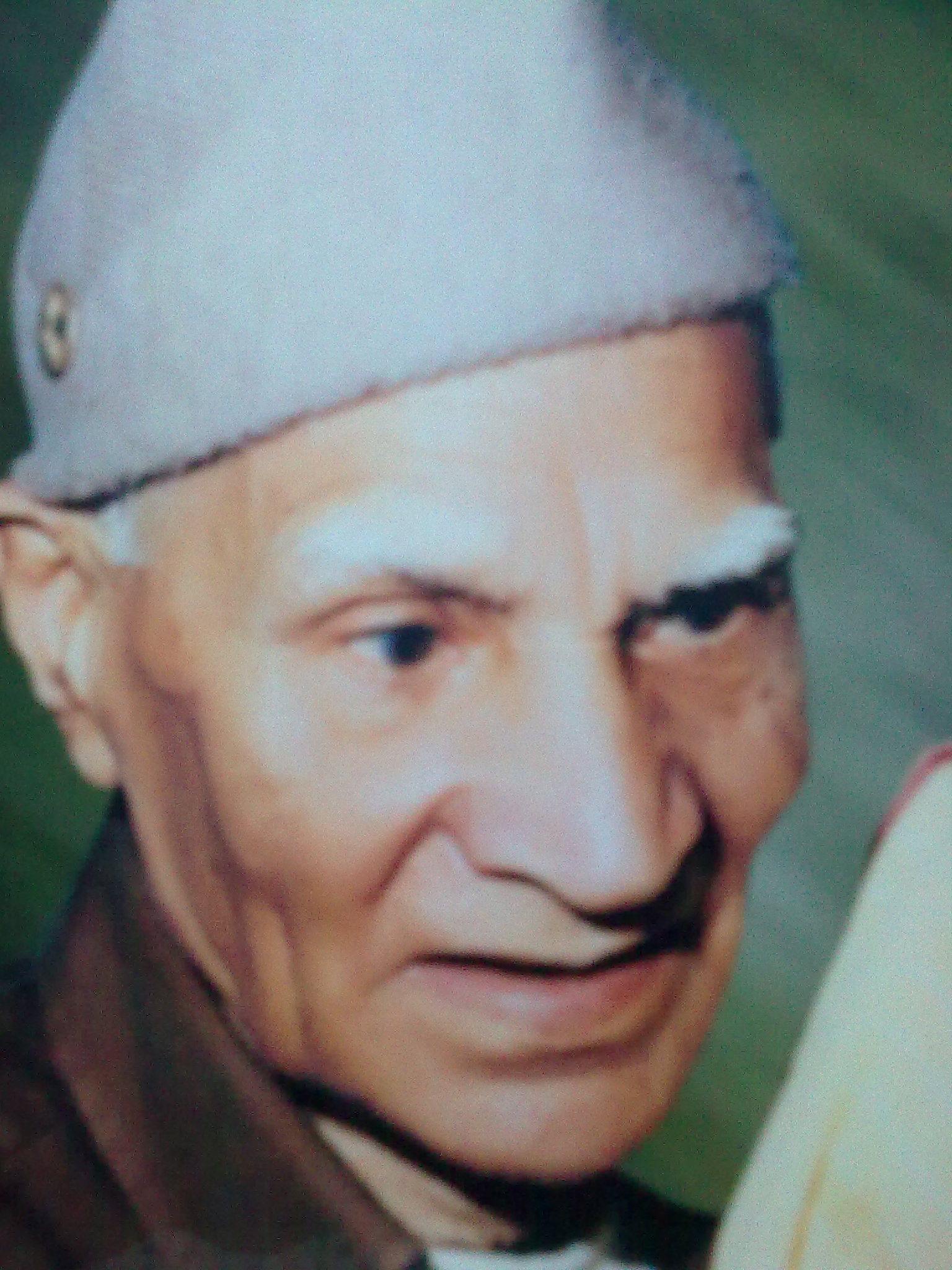
- Munshi Ram
- Born: Sialkot, Punjab
- Died: Chandigarh, India
- Other names: Sant Satguru Bhagat Ji Maharaj, Bhagat Ji

Munshi Ram (19 December 1906 – 29 June 1998), Indian spiritual guru and follower of Faqir Chand.

== Early life ==
He was born in Meghwal family at village Sundernagar at Sialkot, Punjab (now in Pakistan) in the year 1906.

== Spiritual Teachings ==
He was assigned specific work of Guru in the year 1977 by putting a religious mark on the forehead, presenting 'turban' (Hindi:पगड़ी), Rs.5 and a coconut by Faqir Chand. Initially, reluctant Bhagat returned the turban to Faqir but accepted it back when Faqir insisted. On understanding the last will of Faqir and the scenario after Faqir's death, he preferred to leave Manavta Mandir in the year 1982. He performed specific duties of Satguru (in terms of the last will of Faqir Chand.

Munshi Ram wrote flag song of Religion of Humanity established by Faqir Chand. He also wrote prayer of humanity sung in school run by Manavta Mandir, Hoshiarpur. Both were introduced by Faqir himself. Bhagat identified Satsang, Satnam and Satguru as one concept that is true 'experienced knowledge' (Hindi:सत्ज्ञान) imparted by living guru. This concept had been mystified by many gurus resulting in exploitation of poor people.

== A follower and interpreter of Faqir's opinion ==
Munshi Ram wrote first interpretation of Faqir Chand's last will in accordance with Faqir's life and work. It was published in the year 2007. Bhagat further developed and explained various aspects of Faqir's new approach to higher stages of self realization or Surat Shabd Yoga. His published discourses and works depict utility and positive aspects of Indian saintism. He also explored its weaknesses and internal contradictions with a special mention of prophesies made by them which ultimately turned out to be false. He had explored Religion of Humanity through the mission of Data Dayal:'Be man, entire, whole and in everything' wherein a 'human being'becomes 'international center' of Religion of Humanity. Verses written by Bhagat are brief history of Faqir's mission and work. The content underlines importance of commitment to Guru's teachings in totality, the best kind of love in Sant Mat. Bhagat has interpreted 'Dayal Faqir Mat' (Faqir's opinion). His published books are:-

1.Sant Satguru Waqt Ka Vasiyatnama (The Last Will of Sant Satguru Waqt) 2. Satguru Ki Mahima Aur Maya Ka Roop (The Glory of Satguru and Form of Maya 3. Sant Mat (Dayal Faqir Mat Ki Vyakhya) (The Opinion of the Saints:The opinion of Dayal Faqir) 4.Antarrashtriya Manavta Kendra (International Center of Humanity) 5.Prem Shabdavali

He has written 'Megh-Mala' a book completely dedicated to Megh people of India and the teaching of Baba Faqir Chand. His work includes a book on untouchability, a social evil of Indian society representing caste prejudice.

== See also ==
- Baba Faqir Chand
- Manav Dayal I.C.Sharma
- Shiv Brat Lal
- Meghwal
