= Djali =

Djali may refer to:

- Djali, a pet goat belonging to Esmeralda in the 1831 novel The Hunchback of Notre-Dame
- Djali, a character in the 2015 Australian film Spear
- Djali, a 2017 Australian short film co-directed by Hunter Page-Lochard
- Griot, also known as djali, a West African historian, storyteller, praise singer, poet, and/or musician

== See also ==
- Djali Zwan, an acoustic incarnation of American supergroup Zwan
