= Dayal Singh =

Dayal Singh may refer to:

- Baba Dyal Singh (1783–1855), Sikh religious reformer
- Dyal Singh Majithia (1848–1898), Indian banker and activist, founder The Tribune and Punjab National Bank
  - Dyal Singh College, Delhi
  - Dyal Singh Trust Library
- Shiv Dayal Singh (1818–1878), founder and first spiritual leader of Radha Soami sect
