= Manav Dayal I.C.Sharma =

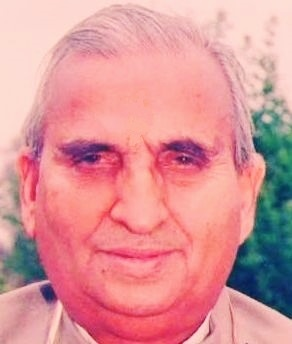
Ishar Chander Sharma

Ishar Chander Sharma (5 September 1921 – 23 February 2001) was a saint from Manavta Mandir Hoshiarpur, Punjab, India. Faqir Chand, a sant of the Sant Mat tradition, appointed him as a successor through his will dated 20 April 1980. With a PhD on Jain Philosopshy under PT Raju, Sharma specialized in epistemology and ethical philosophies of India.

Sharma was a philosopher by profession. He held various academic positions: Claremont College (visiting professor), University of Rajasthan, University of Udaipur (chairman, department of philosophy), Christopher Newport, Virginia (visiting professor), Lynchburg College (visiting professor), Cleveland State University, Ohio (visiting professor), Dyke College, Cleveland and Old Dominion University, Virginia. He also served as the president of the Indian Philosophical Congress for some time.

Sharma first met his guru, Faqir Chand, when Faqir was delivering a sermon in New Delhi. Sharma said that his meeting with Faqir was unusual because Faqir interrupted the sermon to shout Sharma's name, asking Sharma to join him on the stage. Sharma could not understand how this sant knew his name as they had never met or known about each other before this meeting. Later, Faqir told Sharma that he had been waiting for him.

Faqir visited Sharma in the US on many occasions and nominated him to work in his place in presence or absence of Munshi Ram, a co-successor, once he retired from teaching and returned to India. Sharma traveled worldwide to propagate the teachings of Faqir, Radha Soami Mat and Surat Shabd Yoga until his death on 23 February 2001.

== Books ==
- Ethical Philosophies of India
- Cayce, Karma and Reincarnation

== See also ==
- Rai Saligram
- Shiv Brat Lal
