= Diyallı =

- Municipality
- Location within Azerbaijan
- Coordinates: 40°46′22″N 48°13′51″E
- Country: Azerbaijan
- Rayon: Ismailli

Population
  - Total: 2,016
- Time zone: UTC+4 (AZT)
  - Summer (DST): UTC+5 (AZT)

Diyallı (also, Diyally) is a village and municipality in the Ismailli Rayon of Azerbaijan. It has a population of 2,016. The municipality consists of the villages of Diyallı, Güyüm, and Sədiyan.
