= Positivist calendar =

1849 calendar reform proposal

The positivist calendar as devised by Auguste Comte in 1852 and edited in 1909 by P.-F Pécaut in the Nouvelle Édition of his novel, Catéchisme Positiviste.

The positivist calendar was an attempt at calendar reform put forward by Auguste Comte in 1849 that used 13 months of 28 days rather than the Gregorian Calendar's 12 months of 30/31 days in adherence with his scientific study of society, Positivism. The calendar was a revision of the earlier eternal calendar developed by Marco Mastrofini, which also used 13 months of 28 days, and, like the positivist calendar, included a 365th day that didn't fall into any month. Mastrofini himself revised earlier concepts from Hugh Jones, who published under the pen name of "Hirossa Ap-Iccim", the Georgian Calendar, a year made of 13 months of 28 days, named after George II, though it lacked a 365th day, making it 364 days. In the positivist calendar the last day of the year was designated as a festival day to commemorate the dead.

This extra day added to the last month was outside the days of the week cycle, and so the first of a month was always a Monday. On leap years, an additional festival day (also outside the week cycle), to celebrate pariahs and outcasts, would join the memorial day of the dead. The scheme followed the Gregorian calendar rules for determining leap years, and started on January 1. Year 1 "of the Great Crisis" (i.e. the French Revolution) was equivalent to 1789 in the standard Gregorian system.

Much like Comte's other ideas, the positivist calendar never saw widespread use.

== Calendar ==
The months were named, in chronological historical order, for great figures in Western European history in the fields of science, religion, philosophy, industry and literature. Each day of the year was named after neither Catholic Saints as in the Georgian calendar nor after Parisian agriculture as in the French Republican calendar but after figures of history in various fields. Weeks and days were also dedicated to great figures in history as a secular version of the concept of saint's days. In all, the Positivist Calendar "contains the names of 558 great men of all periods, classified according to their field of activity." Villains of history were also commemorated in order to be held up for "perpetual execration". Napoleon, according to Comte, was especially deserving of this fate.

Months were named:

1. Moses - Initial religiosity
2. Homer - Ancient poets
3. Aristotle - Ancient philosophers
4. Archimedes - Ancient science
5. Caesar - Military civilization
6. Saint Paul - Catholicism
7. Charlemagne - Feudal civilization
8. Dante - Modern epics
9. Gutenberg - Modern industry
10. Shakespeare - Modern drama
11. Descartes - Modern philosophy
12. Frederick - Modern politics
13. Bichat - Modern science

As the positivist calendar more perfectly follows the sun's cycle, each day is the same day as the prior year, for example, the 21st of April, 2026 is a Tuesday, however the 21st of April, 2025 was a Monday. In the positivist calendar, both of these days would be Tuesdays. Taking advantage of this, August Comte named each day of the year, so, rather than being Tuesdays, both of these days are Hipparchus, though the original week names were also preserved. In general, the names listed get more and more modern as the year continues, with the first and oldest being Prometheus, the primordial inventor of fire in greek mythology and the last and newest being Franz Josef Gall, the father of phrenology. The names in each month follow the general themes of the name of the month (e.g. Plato is a day in Aristotle). The following table is the full positivist calendar.

Day	1st Week	2nd Week	3rd Week	4th Week
Moses
1st day	Prometheus^{[a]}	Belus and Semiramis	Fuxi	Abraham and Joseph
2nd day	Hercules and Theseus	Sesotris	Laozi	Samuel
3rd day	Orpheus	Menno^{[b]}	Meng-Tsu	Solomon and David
4th day	Ulysses^{[c]}	Cyrus	Tibetan Monks	Isaiah
5th day	Lycurgus	Zoroaster	Zen/Japanese Monks	John the Baptist
6th day	Romulus	The Druids and Ossian	Manco Cápac and Kamehameha	Harun al-Rashid and Abd al-Rahman III
7th day	Numa	Buddha	Confucius	Muhammad
Homer
1st day	Herodotus	Scopas	Aesop and Pilpai	Ennius
2nd day	Tyrtaeus and Sappho	Zeuxis	Aristophanes	Lucretius
3rd day	Anacreon	Ictinus^{[d]}	Terence and Menander	Horace
4th day	Pindar	Praxiteles	Phaedrus^{[e]}	Tibullus
5th day	Sophocles and Euripides	Lysippos	Juvenal	Ovid
6th day	Theocritus and Longus	Apelles	Lucian	Lucan
7th day	Aeschylus	Phidias	Plautus	Virgil
Aristotle
1st day	Anaximander	Solon	Aristippus^{[g]}	Xenocrates
2nd day	Anaximenes^{[f]}	Xenophanes	Antisthenes^{[h]}	Philon of Alexandria
3rd day	Heraclitus	Empedocles	Zeno^{[x]}	John the Evangelist
4th day	Anaxagoras	Thucydides	Cicero and Pliny the Younger	Saint Justin and Saint Irene
5th day	Democritus and Leucippus	Archytas and Philolaus	Epictetus and Arrian	Clement of Alexandria
6th day	Herodotus	Apollonius of Tyana	Tacitus	Origen and Tertullian
7th day	Thales of Miletus	Pythagoras	Socrates	Plato
Archimedes
1st day	Theophrastus	Euclid	Eudoxus and Aratus	Varro
2nd day	Herophilos	Aristaeus	Pytheas and Nearchus^{[j]}	Columella
3rd day	Erasistratus	Theodosius of Bithynia	Aristarchus and Berossus	Vitruvius
4th day	Celsus	Heron and Ctesibius	Eratosthenes and Sosigenes	Strabo
5th day	Galen	Pappus of Alexandria	Ptolemy	Frontinus
6th day	Avicenna and Averroes	Diophantus	Al-Battani and Nasir al-Din	Plutarch
7th day	Hippocrates	Apollonius	Hipparchus	Pliny the Elder
Caesar
1st day	Miltiades	Pericles	Junius Brutus	Augustus and Maecenas
2nd day	Leonidas	Philip	Camillus and Cincinnatus	Vespasian and Titus
3rd day	Aristides	Demosthenes	Fabricius and Regulus^{[w]}	Hadrian and Nerva
4th day	Cimon	Ptolemy Lagus	Hannibal	Antoninus and Marcus-Aurelius
5th day	Xenophon	Philopoemen	Paul-Emile^{[k]}	Papinian and Ulpian
6th day	Phocion and Epaminondas	Polybus^{[i]}	Marius and The Gracchi	Severus Alexander
7th day	Themistocles	Alexander	Scipio^{[l]}	Trajan
Saint Paul
1st day	Saint Luke and Saint James^{[m]}	Constantine	Saint Benoist and Saint Antoine	Saint Francis Xavier and Ignace de Loyola
2nd day	Saint Cyprian	Theodosius	Saint Boniface and Saint Austin	Saint Charles Borromeo and Federico Borromeo
3rd day	Saint Athanasius	Saint Christopher and Saint Basil	Saint Isidore and Saint Bruno	Saint Teresa and Saint Catherine of Siena
4th day	Saint Jerome	Saint Pulcheria and Marcian	Lanfranc and Saint Anselm	Saint Vincent de Paul and Abbey of San Galgano
5th day	Saint Ambrose	Saint Genevieve of Paris	Helen and Beatrice	Louis Bourdaloue and Claude Fleury
6th day	Saint Monica	Saint Gregory the Great	The Architects of the Middle Age and Saint Benezet	William Penn and George Fox
7th day	Saint Augustine	Hildebrand	Saint Bernard	Jacques-Bénigne Bossuet
Charlemagne
1st day	Theodoric the Great	Charles Martel	Saint Leo the Great and Leo IV^{[q]}	Saint Clotilde
2nd day	Pelagius	El Cid	Gerbert and Peter Damian	Saint Bathilda and Saint Matilda of Tuscany
3rd day	Otto the Great and Henri l'Oiseleur	Richard and Saladin	Peter the Hermit	Saint Stephen of Hungary and Matthias Corvinus
4th day	Saint Henry	Joan of Arc	Suger and Saint Eloi	Saint Elizabeth of Hungary
5th day	Villiers^{[n]} and La Valette^{[o]}	Albuquerque and Walter Raleigh	Alexander III and Thomas Becket	Blanche of Castile
6th day	John of Austria and John Sobieski	Bayard (knight) or Bayard (horse)^{[p]}	Francis of Assisi and Saint Dominic	Saint Ferdinand III and Alphonso X
7th day	Alfred	Godfrey of Bouillon	Innocent III	Saint Louis
Dante
1st day	The Troubadours	Leonardo da Vinci and the Titian	Froissart and John of Joinville	Petrarch
2nd day	Boccaccio and Chaucer	Michelangelo and Paolo Veronese	Camoens	Thomas à Kempis and Louis of Granada
3rd day	Rabelais	Holbein and Rembrandt	Spanish Romanticists	Mme. de Lafayette and Mme. de Staël
4th day	Cervantes	Poussin and Lesueur	Chateaubriand	Fénelon and Saint Francis de Sales
5th day	La Fontaine	Diego Velázquez and Alonzo Cano	Walter Scott and Cooper	Klopstock and Gessner
6th day	Foëx and Edmund Smith	Teniers and Rubens	Manzoni	Byron and Élisa Mercœur
7th day	Ariosto	Raphael	Tasso	Milton
Guttemberg
1st day	Marco Polo and Chardin	Benvenuto Cellini	Stevin and Torricelli	Bernard Palissy
2nd day	Jacques Cœur and Gresham	Amontons and Wheatstone	Mariotte and Boyle	Guglielmini and Riquet^{[s]}
3rd day	Gama and Magellan	Harrison and Pierre Leroy	Papin and Worcester	Duhamel (du Monceau)
4th day	Neper and Briggs	Dollond and Graham	Black^{[r]}	Saussure and Bouguer
5th day	Lacaille and Delambre	Arkwright and Jacquart	Jouffroy and Fulton	Coulomb and Borda
6th day	Cook and Tasman	Conté	Dalton and Thilorier	Carnot and Vauban
7th day	Columbus	Vaucanson	Watt	Montgolfier
Shakespeare
1st day	Lope de Vega and Montalvan	Tirso	Alarcon	Pergolèse and Palestrina
2nd day	Moreto and Guillén de Castro	Vondel	Mme de Motteville and Mme Roland	Sachini and Grétry
3rd day	Rojas and Guevara	Racine	Mme de Sevigne and Lady Montagu	Gluck and Lully
4th day	Otway	Voltaire	Lesage and Sterne	Beethoven and Handel
5th day	Lessing	Metastasio and Alfieri	Mme de Staal and Miss Edgeworth	Rossini and Weber
6th day	Goethe	Schiller	Fielding and Richardson	Bellini and Donizetli
7th day	Calderon	Corneille	Molière	Mozart
Descartes
1st day	Albertus Magnus and John of Salisbury	Hobbes and Spinosa	Grotius and Cujas	Robertson and Gibbon
2nd day	Saint Bonaventure and Joachim	Pascal and Giordano Bruno	Fontenelle and Maupertuis	Adam Smith and Dunoyer
3rd day	Roger Bacon and Raimond Llull	Locke and Malebranche	Vico and Herder	Kant and Fichte
4th day	Ramus and The Cardinal of Cusa	Vauvenargues and Mme de Lambert	Fréret and Winckelman	Condorcet and Ferguson
5th day	Montaigne and Erasme	Diderot and Tracy	Montesquieu and d'Aguesseau	Joseph de Maistre and Bonald
6th day	Campanella and More	Cabanis and Georges Leroy	Buffon and Oken	Hegel and Sophie Germain
7th day	Saint Thomas Aquinas	the Chancellor Bacon	Leibnitz	Hume
Frederick
1st day	Maria de Molina	Coligny and L'Hôpital	Ximenes	Sidney and Lambert^{[u]}
2nd day	Côme de Médicis l'Ancien	Barneveldt	Sully and Oxenstierna	Franklin
3rd day	Philippe de Comines and Guicciardini	Gustavus Adolphus	Colbert and Louis XIV	Washington and Koscusko
4th day	Isabella of Castille	De Witt^{[t]}	Walpole and Mazarin	Jefferson
5th day	Charles V and Sixtus V	Ruyter	D'Aranda and Pombal	Bolivar and Toussaint Louverture
6th day	Henri IV	William III	Turgot and Campomanes	Francia
7th day	Louis XI	William the Silent	Richelieu	Cromwell
Bichat
1st day	Copernicus and Tycho Brahe	Viète and Harriott	Bergmann and Scheele	Harvey and Ch. Bell
2nd day	Kepler and Halley	Wallis and Fermat	Priestley and Davy	Boërhaave and Stahl
3rd day	Huyghens and Varignon	Clairaut and Poinsot	Cavendish	Linnaeus and Bernard de Jussieu
4th day	Jacob Bernoulli and Johann Bernoulli	Euler and Monge	Guyton-Morveau and Geoffroy	Haller and Vicq-d'Azyr
5th day	Bradley and Roc̈mer	D'Alembert and Daniel Bernoulli	Berthollet	Lamarck and Blainville
6th day	Volta and Sauveur^{[v]}	Lagrange and Joseph Fourier	Berzélius and Ritter	Broussais and Morgagni
7th day	Galileo	Newton	Lavoisier	Gall

^aThe first day of the year is Prometheus, the Festival day the last day of the year, not the first.

^bThe original French states "Menou" which could, tentatively, potentially refer to general Menou, and could also potentially refer to Menus of Megara or even Memnos. While the theologic nature of the names of the days of the month of Moses points to Menno, the founder of the mennonites, Menno is out of place chronologically, being the youngest in the month, as a figure from the 16th century, nearly a century after the next youngest in Moses, Muhammad.

^cThe original French states "Ulysse", which could be translated as either Ulysses or Odysseus, Ulysses/Ulysse is more common in French, and while both are used in English, Odysseus is more common.

^dCould also be referring to Ictinus of mythology.

^eThe original French "Phédre" could potentially, though very unlikely, refer to Queen Phèdre, the protagonist of the tragedy of the same name, or Phaedra of mythology.

^fCould also refer to Anaximenes of Lampsacus, likely both.

^gLikely referring to Aristippus the Elder and Aristippus the Younger, not Aristippus of Larissa or Aristippus of Argos.

^hLikely referring to Antisthenes of Rhodes rather than Antisthenes the cynic, due to the inclusion of the other historian, Herodotus earlier in the month of Aristotle.

^iThere are many people named Polybus this could refer to.

^jComte writes Nearchos as "Néarque". As this is the month of Archimedes, he is likely referring to Nearchos, the painter in Attica, rather than the much more famous Nearchus of Lato, Navarch of Alexander the Great.

^kWhile there are a great deal of notable people named Paul-Émile, the original calendar document states "Paul-Emile" without an acute accent, and the only person named Paul-Emile with a hyphen and without an acute accent in 1852 when it was published would be Jean-François-Paul-Emile.

^lLikely refers to both Scipio Africanus and Scipio Aemilianus, and the various other generals named Scipio.

^mAlmost certainly refers to James the Great rather than James the Less.

^nComte's calendar simply says "Villiers" and as such this day could refer to any member of the Villiers family notable prior to 1852.

^oThe original French says "La Valette", while this could theoretically refer to Charles, marquis de La Valette or Adolph von La Valette-St. George, neither would be prominent enough in 1852 for Comte to note. Therefore Comte likely means Jean Parisot de Valette, who was occasionally referred to as "Jean Parisot de la Valette", which Comte then shortened to "La Valette"

^pWhile Pierre Terrail, seigneur de Bayard is more likely, as it is the 13th of Charlemagne, Comte could also be referring to Bayard, the legendary horse that Charlemagne killed. Prior in the month Comte names the 6th after John of Austria, and according to some sources, both Bayard the horse and John of Austria died in the same region, which also points to the horse.

^qThe original French, "Léon IV" could refer to Leo IV the Khazar, Leo IV of Armenia, or Pope Leo IV. Pope Leo the Great is also the namesake of the 15th of Charlemagne, which points to Pope Leo IV.

^rThere are a great deal of people named Black, for the 18th of Guttemberg Comte simply says "Black.". See Black (surname).

^sAs the subtitle for the month of Guttemberg is "l'Industrie Moderne" or "Modern Industry", "Riquet" could also refer to the industrialist Joseph de Riquet de Caraman.

^tAny member of the De Witt family could be being referred to.

^uHenri de Lambert is the husband of Madame de Lambert.

^vOr Toussaint-Dieudonné Sauveur.

^wComte could be referencing a number of Romans, likely Marcus Atilius Regulus, but also Marcus Atilius Regulus, Marcus Atilius Regulus, Marcus Atilius Regulus Calenus, or Marcus Aquilius Regulus.

^x Zeno of Citium, Zeno of Elea, Zeno, could be the namesake of this date.

== Criticism ==
In 1849, Comte wrote that he called his calendar a "breach of continuity" with the old way of thinking, and his Humanistic calendar was part of that breach. He called it, "a provisional institution, destined for the present exceptional century to serve as an introduction to the abstract worship of Humanity."

Aside from the religious references the calendar carried, Duncan Steel, author of Marking Time, believes the novelty of the calendar's month names alone helped prevent the wide acceptance of this proposal.

The main reason that his suggestion [for calendar reform] failed to find favor with many people seems to have been that he insisted on naming the months for various notable persons from historical to modern times, ... One must admit that it would seem strange to give the date as the third day of Homer, and with a month named for the bard a reference to "Shakespeare's Twelfth Night" would be ambiguous.

Author Tricia Lootens writes that the idea of naming days after literary figures, as if they were Catholic Saint days, didn't catch on outside the Positivist movement.

Outside of positivist circles, canonization of literary secular saints was nearly always slightly tinged with irony or nostalgia, and positivist circles were never large.

== Advantages ==
The several advantages of the Positivist calendar are mainly related to its organization. The subdivision of the year is very regular and systematic:

- Every year has exactly 52 weeks divided in 13 months.
- Each month has exactly 28 days divided in 4 weeks.
- Every day of the month falls on the same weekday in each month (i.e. the 17th always falls on a Wednesday).

Specific dates can be referred to by their given names (i.e. last Tuesday was Amontons)

The vast array of historical figures the average person would have to know to communicate time would spread intellectualism and education.

All dates being named dissolves ambiguity between date and time notations, as rather than a date such as the 9th of April, 2026 being either written as 9/4/26 and 4/9/26 depending on location, which causes confusion with the 4th of September, 2026, one could just add "Aristaeus", which is the name of the 9th of Archimedes in the positivist calendar.

The calendar is the same every year (perennial), unlike the annual Gregorian calendar, which differs from year to year. Hence, scheduling is easier for institutions and industries with extended production cycles. Movable holidays celebrated on the nth certain weekday of a month, such as U.S. Thanksgiving day, would be able to have a fixed date while keeping their traditional weekday.

Statistical comparisons by months are more accurate, since all months contain exactly the same number of business days and weekends, likewise for comparisons by 13-week quarters. Supporters of the Positivist calendar have argued that thirteen equal divisions of the year are superior to twelve unequal divisions in terms of monthly cash flow in the economy.

== Disadvantages ==
While each quarter would be equal in length (13 weeks), thirteen is a prime number, placing all activities currently done on a quarterly basis out of alignment with the months.

Christian, Islamic and Jewish leaders are historically opposed to the calendar, as their tradition of worshiping every seventh day would result in either the day of the week of worship changing from year to year, or eight days passing when "The Festival of All the Dead” or “The Festival of Holy Women" occurs.

Birthdays, significant anniversaries, and other holidays would need to be recalculated as a result of a calendar reform, and would always be on the same day of the week. This could be problematic for Public holidays that would fall under non-working days under the new system; e.g. If a public holiday is celebrated on January 8, under the Positivist calendar that holiday would always fall on a Sunday, Moses 8, which is already a non-working day, and compensatory leave would have to be given each year on Moses 9, thus essentially changing the date of the holiday to Moses 9. A vast amount of administrative data, and the software that manages that, would have to be corrected/adjusted for the new system, potentially having to support both the positivist and the standard time keeping systems for a period of time.

The reorganization of the numbering of years would inevitably cause confusion between years between calendar systems, such as the year 100 under the positivist calendar and 100 AD under the Gregorian calendar.

The number of names the average person would have to memorize can be a challenge.

== See also ==
- International Fixed Calendar
- Positivism
- Religion of humanity
- Secular humanism
- World Calendar
