= Donald Robertson =

Donald Robertson may refer to:

== Arts and entertainment ==
- Donald Robertson (artist) (born 1962), artist/illustrator and creative director for Estée Lauder Companies
- Donald XL Robertson (born 1973), hip-hop producer and entrepreneur
- Donald Robertson (rock journalist), Australian journalist who ran Adelaide music magazine Roadrunner (1978–1983)
- Donald Robertson (writer) (1930–1995), Scottish engineer turned scriptwriter, wrote for Thunderbirds
- Don Robertson (songwriter) (1922–2015), American songwriter and pianist

== Bureaucrats and politicians ==
- Donald Robertson (British administrator) (1847–1930), British colonial administrator
- Donald Robertson (New Zealand) (1860–1942), Public Service Commissioner in New Zealand
- Donald Robertson (politician), Canadian politician
- Donald B. Robertson (1931–2024), member of the Maryland House of Delegates

== Sport ==
- Donald Robertson (athlete) (1905–1949), Scottish athlete
- Don Robertson (referee) (born 1987), Scottish football referee
- Don Robertson (baseball) (1930–2014), Major League Baseball player
- Don Robertson (television announcer) (1928–2021), American television announcer

== Others ==
- Donald J. Robertson, cognitive-behavioral psychotherapist and author
- Donald Struan Robertson (1885–1961), classical scholar at the University of Cambridge

== See also ==
- Don Robertson (disambiguation)
