= Don Robertson =

Don Robertson may refer to:

- Don Robertson (author) (1929–1999), American novelist
- Don Robertson (baseball) (born 1930), former Major League Baseball player
- Don Robertson (composer) (born 1942), American composer
- Don Robertson (golfer), 1987 and 1988 winner of the Northern Texas PGA Championship
- Don Robertson (songwriter) (1922–2015), American songwriter and pianist
- Don Robertson (referee) (born 1987), Association football referee
- Don Robertson (television announcer) (born 1926), retired American television announcer

== See also ==
- Donald Robertson (disambiguation)
