= Charles Delvaux de Fenffe =

Belgian doctor

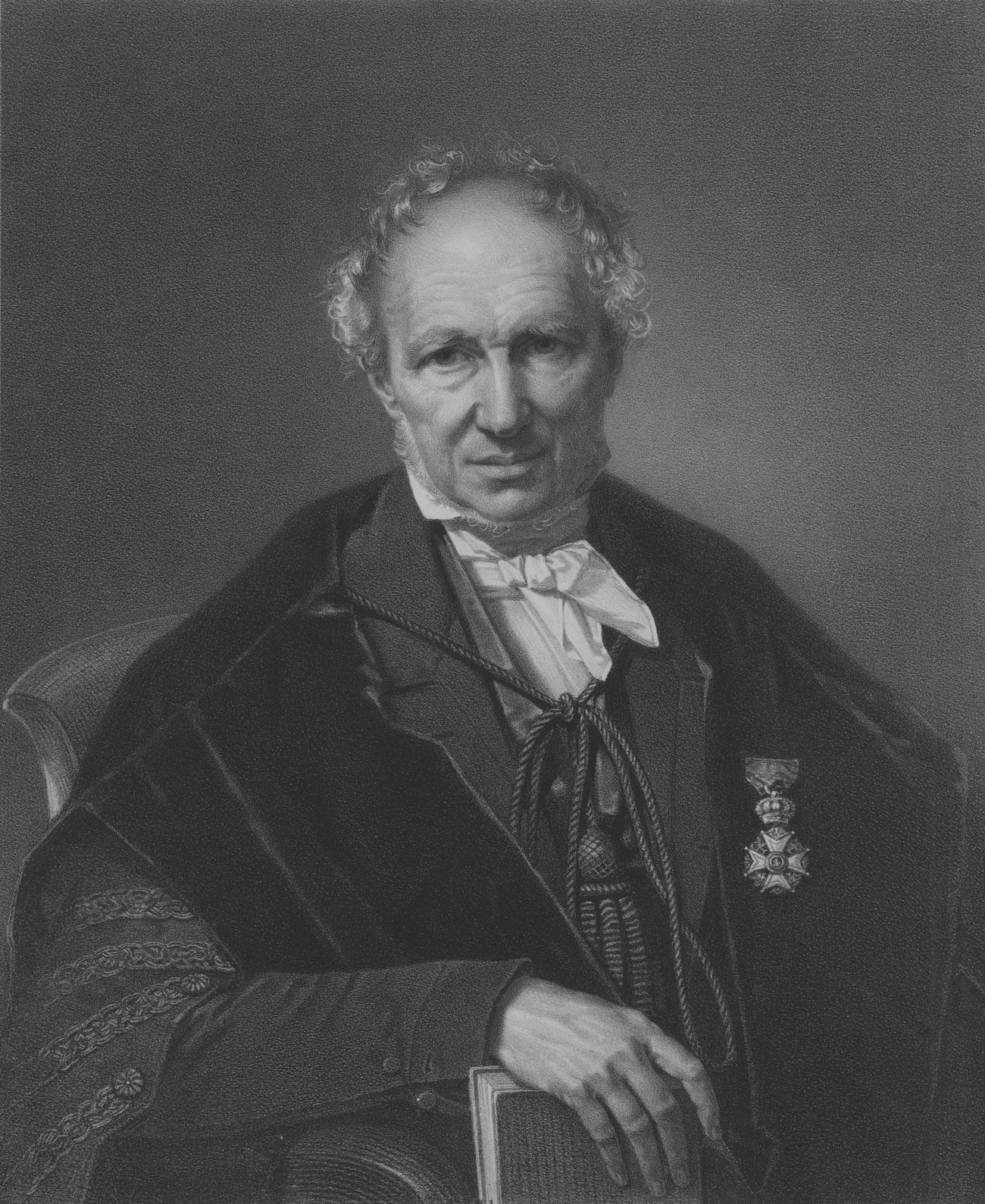
- Lithograph by Joseph Schubert after the portrait of Charles Delvaux de Fenffe by Barthélemy Vieillevoye.
- Born: July 25, 1782; Rochefort, Prince-Bishopric of Liège
- Died: November 14, 1863 (aged 81); Fenffe Castle (Ciergnon), Houyet, Namur Province, Belgium
- Occupations: Chemist, doctor, and teacher

Charles Delvaux de Fenffe (July 25, 1782 – November 14, 1863) was a Belgian doctor of medicine, doctor of sciences, and professor at the University of Liège. He served as the sixteenth rector of the university from 1832 to 1833.

Born in the southern part of the Principality of Liège, Charles Delvaux received a religious education, which was then seen as a means of upward mobility in the bourgeoisie of the principality. After studying medicine in Paris in the early 19th century, he returned in 1809 to his hometown and then to Liège to practice his profession. Soon, he discovered teaching, first at the Imperial Lyceum from 1810 onwards, then at the University of Liège from its establishment in 1817, where he taught physics, chemistry, and metallurgy. He became rector of the university between 1832 and 1833. After becoming emeritus professor in 1837, he continued to practice medicine in Liège until 1857. He then returned to his native village, where he cared for the less fortunate. He died in 1863 at his estate in Fenffe.

His scientific career, in terms of publications, was not extensive; he preferred teaching and popularization. His main works focused on pharmacy inspection, the control of suspicious food, and the conducting of toxicological analyses at the request of the Prosecutor's Office. He was also a member of various learned societies, including the Royal Society of Sciences of Liège, the Royal Academy of Sciences of Belgium, and the Royal Academy of Medicine of Belgium.

A ferric phosphate mineral whose chemical composition he determined was named "delvauxite" in his honor by André Dumont.

== Early life and education ==
Jean-Charles-Philippe-Joseph Delvaux de Fenffe was born on July 25, 1782, and baptized the same day in Rochefort. He was the son of the physician Théodore-Joseph (1731–1822) and Marie-Anne-Élisabeth Bellefroid (1758–1809). Since 1784, the family has owned the Fenffe Castle, acquired from the Prince of Gavre.

At the age of eight, he was entrusted to Jacques-Louis-Théodore Bellefroid, his maternal uncle and canon of the collegiate church of Saint-Pierre in Liège. At the time, in the Principality of Liège, one of the ways to ascend in the enriched bourgeoisie was to associate with the canons, known as trefoiners, of Saint Lambert's Cathedral. Charles was thus educated at the cathedral school.

During the Liège Revolution, he emigrated to Westphalia with his uncle. Aligned with the Bonapartist regime, he went to Paris in 1800 with two of his brothers to study medicine at the Paris School of Medicine. He obtained his doctorate in medicine in 1806. His thesis was titled "Propositions on Respiration," under the direction of Alexis Boyer.

He then returned to his hometown to practice his new profession but went back to Liège in 1809.

== Teaching ==
Charles Delvaux, who was interested in the burgeoning industry, hesitated to continue practicing medicine, but in 1810, the door to teaching opened for him. Ultimately, he would practice all three. In 1810, a decree from the Grand Master of the University of France, Louis de Fontanes, entrusted him with the chair of physical sciences at the Imperial Lyceum of Liège. The following year, on September 25, 1811, the Faculty of Sciences was established as part of the Academy of Liège. Charles was among the four professors and taught physics and chemistry. He was promoted to the rank of university officer. He was then appointed to the Academic Council and obtained his doctorate in sciences, a very rare diploma at the time. His zeal and piety, stemming from his religious education and heavily influencing his teaching at the Imperial Lyceum, his conformity, and his loyalty to the regime, earned him a certain esteem from the ruling power in Paris.

In 1814, he was appointed by Johann August Sack, the general governor of the Lower Rhine, to teach at the Gymnasium, which replaced the lyceum.

In 1817, William I, King of the Netherlands, founded the University of Liège, and Charles Delvaux joined the Faculty of Sciences. He taught physics, general chemistry applied to the arts, and metallurgy until the reorganization of 1835. Afterwards, he focused solely on chemistry, both general and applied. He served several times as dean of the faculty and in 1832, he was rector of the university for one year.

== Later career and death ==
He applied for emeritus status in November 1837, at the age of 55, but continued to supervise students for years and practice medicine until 1857. He remained a chemistry examiner within the Medical Commission of the Province of Liège from 1824. Between 1818 and 1849, he awarded the diploma of pharmacist and, with Nicolas-Gabriel Ansiaux, established a pharmacy course at the Bavaria Hospital in Liège in 1827, which his student, Gilles Peters-Vaust, was in charge of.

Highly appreciated by his students, he was offered a portrait painted by Barthélemy Vieillevoye in 1853, sixteen years after leaving the university.

In 1857, at the age of 75, he returned to his ancestral estate in Fenffe, where he cared for the less fortunate despite his infirmities. He notably had to deal with a cholera epidemic in Ciergnon. He died on November 14, 1863, at the age of 81, the last surviving professor appointed at the founding of the University of Liège. On November 24, 1863, he was buried in the cemetery of Ciergnon.

== Personal life ==
Charles Delvaux married his first cousin, Louise-Hélène-Clémence Bellefroid, on August 29, 1809. They had eleven children, but only three survived to adulthood. Lucie (1812–1883) became a nun of the Daughters of the Cross congregation, Marie-Charles-Adolphe (1815–1887) became a professor of metallurgy at the University of Liège, and Charles-Marie-Joseph (1824–1879) became a doctor of medicine and mayor of Chevetogne. His grandson, Henry Delvaux de Fenffe, son of Marie-Charles-Adolphe, was a Belgian politician.

Charles Delvaux, during his life in Liège, lived on Saint-Pierre Square, now Saint-Pierre Street (known as the "Habitation Chapeauville").

== Works and publications ==
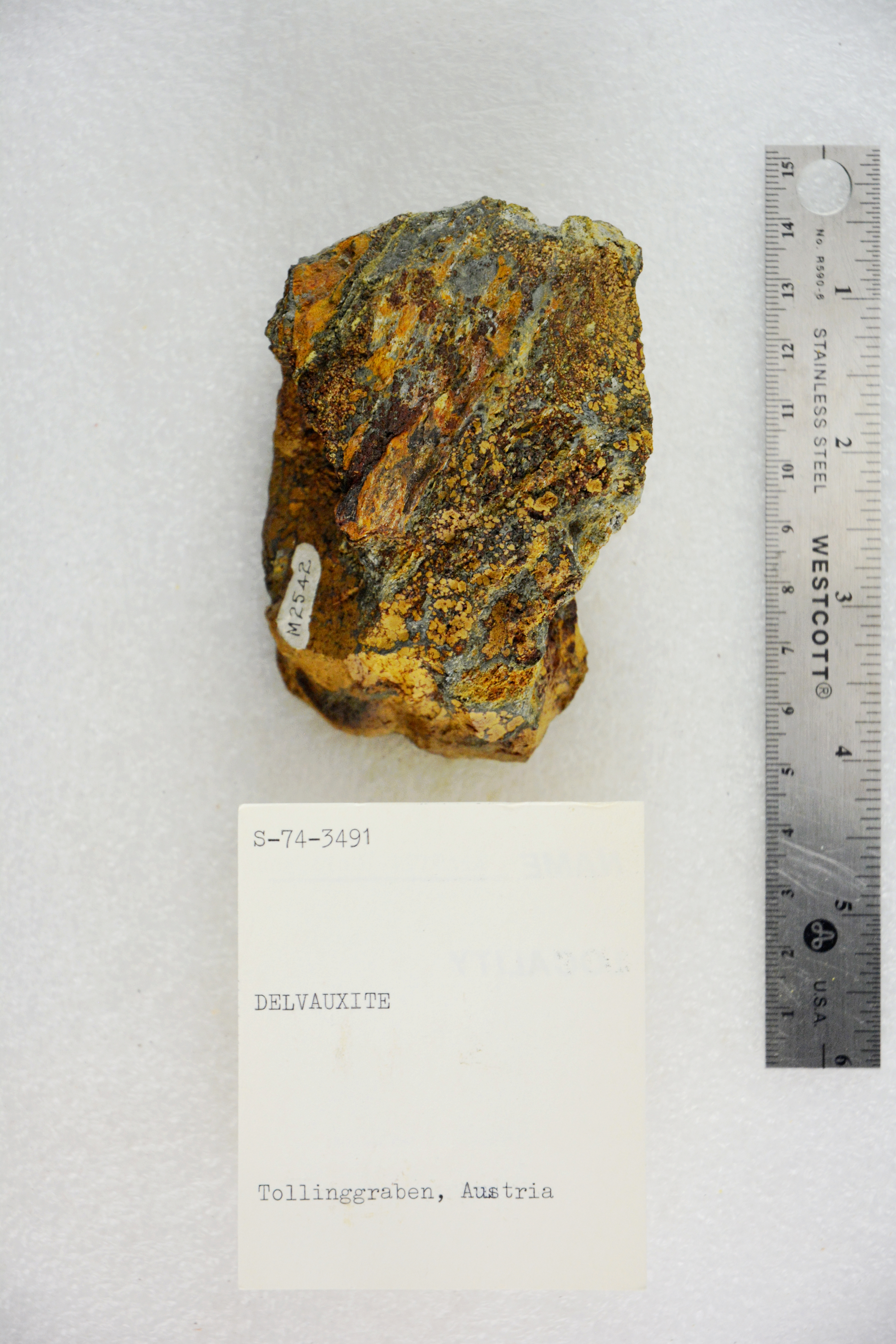
Delvauxite.

In 1830, he was tasked by the Dutch government, along with Nicolas-Gabriel Ansiaux and Toussaint-Dieudonné Sauveur, to create the Belgian pharmacopoeia. Although this project did not materialize, probably due to the Belgian Revolution, Charles Delvaux was part of subsequent commissions responsible for revising the Belgian Pharmacopoeia, which was published in 1854 but had its first edition in 1823.

His main work was carried out through the Medical Commission of which he was a part. This mainly involved pharmacy inspection, the control of suspicious food, and the conducting of toxicological analyses at the request of the Prosecutor's Office. Although Charles Delvaux intended to write a work on the drinking water of the Province of Liège, his project never materialized. His analyses of the waters of Chaudfontaine, the Sainte-Catherine fountain in Huy, the coal mines of Sainte-Marguerite and Sainte-Walburge in Liège, Basse-Wez in Grivegnée, and Juslenville were published by Richard Courtois and Toussaint-Dieudonné Sauveur.

As a chemist, Charles Delvaux determined the composition of a species of ferric phosphate found in the spoil heaps of a lead mine in Berneau. The geologist André Hubert Dumont found another specimen in a quarry in the same locality, which he presented to the Geological Society of France on May 21, 1838. In homage to its discoverer, he gave it the name "delvauxite".

Charles Delvaux was a member of various learned societies, including the Free Society of Physical and Medical Sciences of Liège, the Free Society of Emulation of Liège, the Anatomical Society of Paris, the Medical Society of Liège, and a corresponding member of the Medical Society of Antwerp. He was one of the founders of the Natural Sciences Society of Liège and the Royal Society of Sciences of Liège. In 1841, he joined the Royal Academy of Sciences of Belgium and the Royal Academy of Medicine of Belgium, which at the time had only eight members.

Apart from his doctoral thesis, he did not publish any works. He was primarily known as a popularizer, particularly in geology.

== Honors ==
Charles Delvaux de Fenffe was:

- Knight of the Order of Leopold (1837).

== Bibliography ==
- Carmanne (1868). Nécrologe liégeois (in French).
- Florkin, Marcel (1963). Notice sur Charles Delvaux de Fenffe (PDF) (in French).
- Opsomer, Carmélia (2012). Nouvelle biographie nationale (PDF) (in French). Académie royale des sciences, des lettres et des beaux-arts de Belgique.
