= Hugh Jones (professor) =

American mathematician

The Reverend Hugh Jones (1691–1760) was an American mathematician. He is the most famous and accomplished of Anglican clergymen of the same name from the American colonies of Virginia and Maryland. Jones is best known for his authorship of The Present State of Virginia, and a short view of Maryland and North Carolina (London, 1724). For several years he taught mathematics at The College of William and Mary, in Williamsburg, Virginia, where Jones Hall is named for him.

== Birth and education ==
He appears to have been born in Herefordshire, England, just east of Wales, in the parish of Little Dewchurch. Alumni records at Oxford University list his matriculation to Jesus College in March 1708, age 17, placing his birth around 1691. He received the B.A. in 1712, according to these records, and the M.A. in 1716. In a deposition given at age 49 (1740), he said "That he learnt Arithmetick at School, studied Geometry, Geography and Astronomy in the University of Oxford;" that he there took the degrees of B.A. and M.A.; that "Doctor Robinson, then Bishop of London ... advised [him] to perfect himself, as well as Time would allow, in the Mathematicks, for that his Lordship intended to send him over to the Colledge of William and Mary in Virginia, as Professor of the Mathematicks. That, thereupon, [he] applied himself to the Study of Algebra (which he had not applied himself to before) under the Instruction of Mr. Hudson of Christ-Church, and was admitted Professor of Mathematicks in the Colledge of William and Mary aforesaid, in the Year 1717, and continued studying and teaching the Mathematicks there till 1721."

== Virginia years ==
Besides the College of William and Mary, Jones can be connected in some leadership capacity with Bruton Parish Church in Williamsburg, Jamestown Church, and St. Stephen's Church of King and Queen's County. He served at least two terms, also, as Chaplain of the House of Burgesses in the Colonial Capital of Williamsburg. Allied with Lt. Gov. Alexander Spotswood in a dispute over ecclesiastical authority granted to James Blair, Head of the college, he fell out with Blair and, apparently, returned to England for some time after 1721. Upon his return to Virginia around 1724, Blair appointed him to lead the highly contentious congregation of St. Stephen's. He resigned that post about 1725, after a dispute over the placement of the church pulpit. He then migrated north, to Maryland.

== Maryland years ==
Jones led the William and Mary Parish Church in Charles County, Maryland for the next five or six years, after which, in 1731, he moved farther north to St. Stephen's Church, North Sassafras Parish, Cecil County, Maryland. Apart from his clerical duties at St. Stephen's, Jones also headed a committee of Maryland mathematicians in the dispute between Maryland and Pennsylvania over the circular northern border of Delaware. The above-mentioned deposition can be found in legal documents related to that dispute. Jones held the rectorship at St. Stephen's until just before his death on 8 September 1760, around age 70. His burial site is the cemetery there. He is buried next to his nephew, William Barroll, who succeeded him as rector. Nearly a century after his death the Rev. Ethan Allen, D.D. would write: "Mr. Jones was a man of very considerable learning and he gained strong friendships wherever he went. His piety was earnest and his morals unexceptionable. He had a clear, vigorous mind and wrote in a style once lucid and chaste. His published works do credit to his memory."

== Publications ==
=== The Present State of Virginia ===
Hugh Jones's most well known work is based on his first several years of residence in America, and remains a primary resource for Virginia's colonial history. The book was occasioned, he wrote, by his finding that "few people in England (even many concerned in public affairs of this kind) have correct Notions of the true State of the Plantations [Colonies], and having been eagerly applied to frequently by Persons of the greatest Figure, Experience and Judgment in political and national Concerns, for Information concerning all the Circumstances of Virginia, [he] was requested to digest methodically and publish what [he] knew and thought of these Matters." About the slavery he encountered on the plantations he observed that the slaves' work "is not very laborious, their greatest Hardship consisting in that they and their Posterity are not at their own Liberty or Disposal, but are the Property of their Owners; and when they are free, they know not how to provide so well for themselves generally; neither did they live so plentifully nor (many of them) so easily in their own Country, where they are made Slaves to one another, or taken Captive by their Enemies." Included in the work also is this erroneous prediction: "There can be no Room for real Apprehension of Danger of a Revolt of the Plantations in future Ages. Or if any of them should attempt it, they might very easily be reduced by the others; for all of them will never unite with one another."

=== Accidence to the English Tongue ===
In 1724, while he was in England, Jones also published an English grammar, Accidence to the English Tongue, chiefly for the use of such boys and men, as have never learnt Latin perfectly, and for the benefit of the female sex; also for the Welch, Scotch, Irish and foreigners. In the assessment of one scholar, "A complete reading of the little grammar will prove the author's gift for simplicity and directness....It reflects a pleasantly unostentatious mind, of marked seriousness...." Though sometimes called "The First Colonial Grammar in English", or mistakenly credited as the first grammar written by and American in America, Jones was an Englishman, the book was written in England between 1721 and 1724, and it was published in "London: printed for John Clarke, 1724." It is not clear if Jones used it when he returned to America, as he was fully occupied with clerical duties, or that anyone else taught from it: only two paper copies of this short book remain, one in the British Library and one at Columbia University.

=== Georgian Calendar (Pancronometer) ===
The Gentleman's Magazine (London) of July 1745, pp. 377–79, contains "An Essay on the British computation of time, coin, weights and measures," outlining a calendar reform called the Georgian Calendar, after King George II of Great Britain. The essay is signed "Hirossa Ap-Iccim," whose residence is given as Maryland. It proposes a calendar year of 364 weekdays, divided into thirteen 28 day months. The same calendar plan is expounded in a pamphlet authored by one "H.J.," which appeared in London in 1753: Pancronometer, or Universal Georgian Calendar. Bundled with it was a treatise on "The Reasons, Rules and Uses of Octave Computation, or Natural Arithmetic." In the Pancronometer, H.J.'s authorship of the 1745 essay is acknowledged. It is theorised there that the Earth would originally have orbited the Sun in exactly 364 days, on a perfect circle, but slipped into a slightly longer, elliptical orbit as a result of the great flood.

Jones's most original contribution to calendar reform is the proposal to remove one or two days from the cycle of the week, thereby establishing a perennial calendar, beginning every year on the same weekday. The same idea had been thought of ~1650 years earlier c. 100 BCE and incorporated into the calendar used by the Qumran community, but was lost c. 68 CE when the Romans eradicated Qumran. The idea is suggested again in 1834, by Abbot Marco Mastrofini. It is also employed in Auguste Comte's Positivist Calendar (1849), which, except for month names and holidays, is virtually the same as the Georgian calendar. In the mid twentieth century, reformers promoting the International Fixed Calendar and The World Calendar employed the same technique, often referring to the 365th and 366th days as "blank days."

=== Georgian Standard (Octave computation) ===
The "Essay" mentioned above contains also the recommendation that divisions of coins, weights and measures be based on 8 instead of 10. "Whereas reason and convenience indicate to us a uniform standard for all quantities; which I shall call the Georgian standard; and that is only to divide every integer in each species into eight equal parts, and every part again into 8 real or imaginary particles, as far as is necessary. For tho' all nations count universally by tens (originally occasioned by the number of digits on both hands) yet 8 is a far more complete and commodious number; since it is divisible into halves, quarters, and half quarters (or units) without a fraction, of which subdivision ten is uncapable...." In the treatise on Octave computation Jones concluded: "Arithmetic by Octaves seems most agreeable to the Nature of Things, and therefore may be called Natural Arithmetic in Opposition to that now in Use, by Decades; which may be esteemed Artificial Arithmetic."
