= Regulus (disambiguation) =

Regulus is the brightest star in the constellation Leo, the lion.

Regulus, Latin for little king, may also refer to:

== Animals ==
- Regulus (bird), a bird genus
- Regulus (horse), a Thoroughbred racehorse and sire
- Basilisk, from the Greek term for regulus
- Kinglet, a small bird in the family Regulidae
  - Regulus regulus or Goldcrest, a bird in the family

== Fiction ==
- Regulus (Bomberman), a character in the Bomberman series of video games
- Regulus Black, a fictional character from the Harry Potter series of novels by J. K. Rowling
- Regulus Corneas, a character in the series Re:Zero − Starting Life in Another World
- Demon Regulus, a fallen Angel
- Regulus (Crowne play), a 1692 work by John Crowne
- Regulus (1744 play), a 1744 work by William Havard
- Regulus, a story in Rudyard Kipling's 1899 Stalky & Co. collection
- Leo Regulus, a character from the manga Saint Seiya: The Lost Canvas
- a character from the High School DxD series

== Military ==
- French ship Régulus (1805)
- HMS Regulus, a list of ships with the name
- SS Regulus (T-AKR-292), an Algol class vehicle cargo ship
- SSM-N-8 Regulus, a cruise missile in service 1955-1964
- SSM-N-9 Regulus II, a cruise missile first produced in 1956
- Regulus (ship), a list of ships with the name
- Regulus missile submarines, a group of submarines operated by the United States Navy between 1959 and 1964
- USS Regulus, a list of ships with the name

== Minerals ==
- Regulus, the metallic form of antimony
- Regulus, the end-product of metallic ore smelting
- Regulus, an alchemical symbol (variously 🜲, 🜳, 🜴, or 🜵) for the regulus-producing process

== People ==
- Saint Regulus (4th century), Christian saint, purported to have brought the relics of St. Andrew to Scotland
- Erwan Regulus (born 2000), French footballer
- Marcus Atilius Regulus (consul 267 BC), a Roman consul
- Marcus Aquilius Regulus (c. 1st century AD), a Roman who is discussed in the works of Pliny the Younger

== Other uses ==
- Regulus (painting), a 1828 painting by J. M. W. Turner
- Regulus (1797 ship), a trading ship built in Spain and captured by the British
- Regulus (geometry) is the locus of lines meeting three given skew lines
- Regulus (video game)
- Regulus Grammar Compiler, a system for compiling unification grammars into grammars for speech recognition systems
- SS Regulus, a Canadian steamship
- Regulus, a song composed by yuuyu commissioned for the group Leo/Need from the game Hatsune Miku: Colorful Stage!

== See also ==
- Marcus Atilius Regulus (disambiguation)
