= Polybius (disambiguation) =

Polybius (c. 203 BC – 120 BC) was an ancient Greek historian.

Polybius may also refer to:

== People ==
- Polybius (freedman) (fl. 1st century), freedman and later secretariat under the Roman Emperor Claudius
- Polybius of Tralles, a 2nd-century Christian bishop mentioned in the writings of Ignatius of Antioch

== Other uses ==
- Polybius (crab), a genus of swimming crabs
- Polybius (crater), a lunar impact crater
- Polybius (urban legend), a fictitious video game featured in urban legend
  - Polybius (2017 video game), released for the PlayStation 4 inspired by the urban legend
  - "Polybius", the fourth episode of Dimension 404, based on the urban legend
- Polybius square, a cipher key technique
- Polybius Bank, an Estonian bank

== See also ==
- Polybus (disambiguation)
