= Henry Delvaux de Fenffe =

Belgian nobleman and civil servant

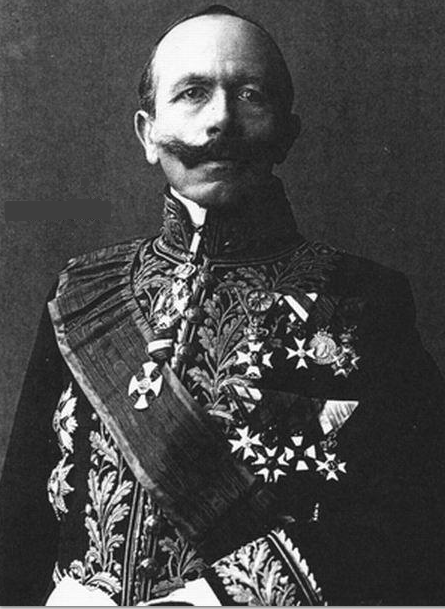

coat of Arms

Henry Charles Marie Adolphe Delvaux de Fenffe was a Belgian nobleman and high-ranking civil servant.

== Career ==
He achieved his Doctorate of Law in 1885. He was member of the provincial council, 1985. In 1898 he was shortly member of parliament. He served as Royal High Commissioner for Eupen-Malmedy, and governor of Devastated Regions. Between 1908 and 1919 he was Governor of liege in succession of Léon Pety de Thozée. He was then Senator, from 1926 to 1936.

== Bibliography ==
- "Faut-il appliquer la participation aux benefices?" Liege, 1892
- "Les travaux publics." Liege, 1908
- "Les habitations ouvrieres." Liege, 1909
- "La formation de la jeunesse. L'education physique. Discours." Liege, 1910
- "La science du plein air." Liege, 1911
- "La science d'alimentation populaire." Liege, 1912
- "La science de l'adaptabilite de la jeunesse." Liege, 1913

== Honours ==
- Kingdom of Belgium:
  - 1919: Created 1st Baron Delvaux de Fenffe, by Royal Decree
  - 1932 : knight Grand Cross of the Order of the Crown
  - Grand Officer of the Order of Leopold
- Vatican: Knight Grand Cross of the Order of St. Gregory the Great
- France: Grand Officer of the Legion of Honour
- Kingdom of Greece:
  - Grand Officer of the Order of the Phoenix
  - Knight of the Order of the Redeemer
- Luxemburg: Knight of the Order of the Oak Crown
- Civil Cross

== See also ==
- 1898 Belgian general election
- Charles Delvaux de Fenffe
