= Delvauxite =

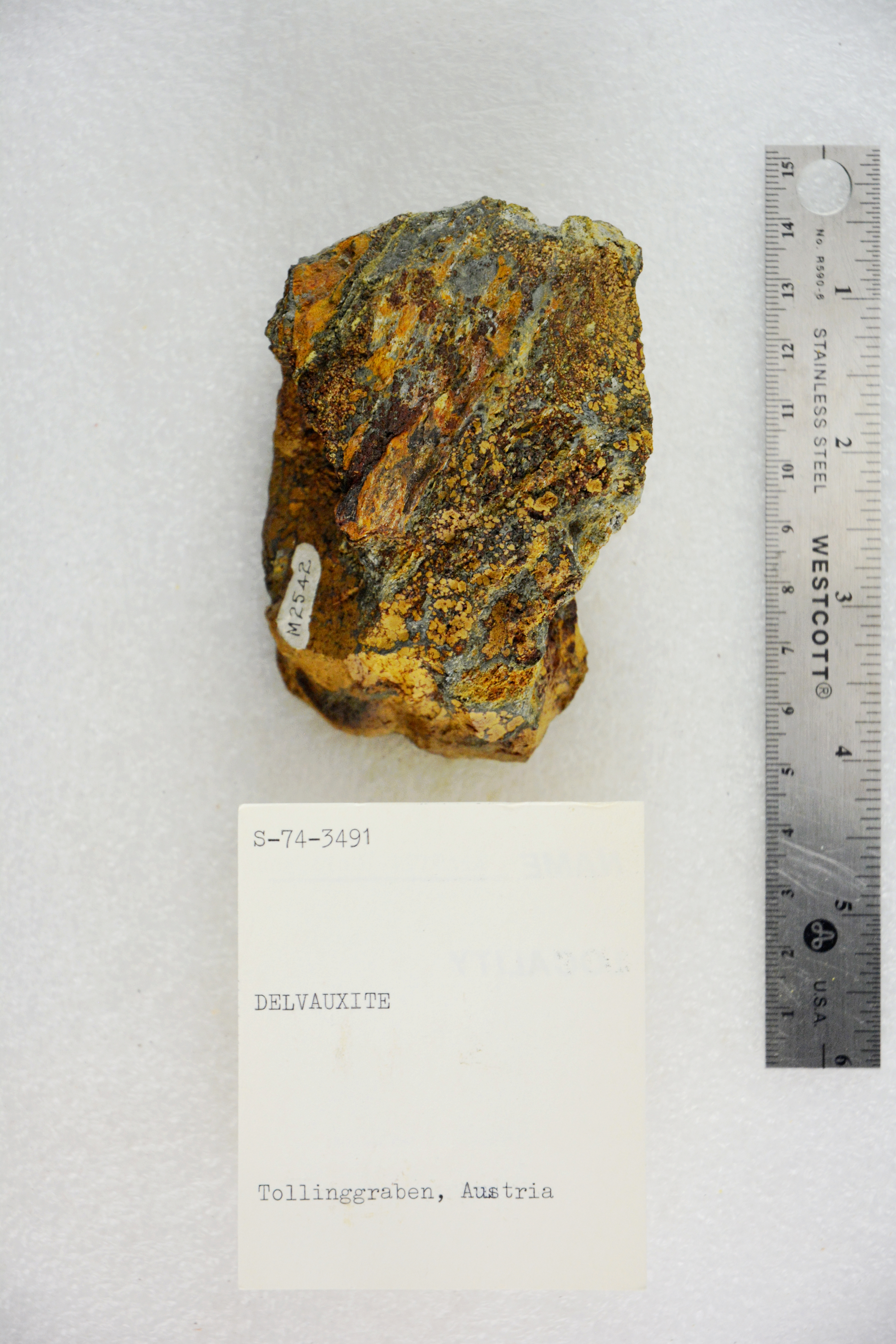

General
- Category: Phosphate minerals
- Formula: CaFe_{4}(PO_{4},SO_{4})_{2}(OH)_{8}•(4-6)H_{2}O
- IMA symbol: Dvx

Identification
- Color: Yellow to brown to dark brown

Delvauxite, also known as borickite, is a yellow to brown to dark brown amorphous mineral, sometimes forming a botryoidal mass. Its chemical formula is CaFe_{4}(PO_{4},SO_{4})_{2}(OH)_{8}•(4-6)H_{2}O. and it may sometimes form stalactites.

It was first described in 1838 by Belgian geologist André Dumont and dedicate to chimist Charles Delvaux de Fenffe (1782–1863) who first analysed its chemical composition. It was found in Bernau, Liege, Belgium and Stredocesky, Czech Republic.
