= Polybus =

Polybus (Πόλυβος) is an ancient Greek masculine name. It is the name of:

- Polybus (physician) (fl. c. 400 BCE), author of On the Nature of Man
- Polybus (mythology), various mythological figures

== See also ==
- Polybius (disambiguation)
