= Armelin's calendar =

Armelin's calendar was developed around 1887 by French astronomer Gaston Armelin, who developed a twelve-month calendar in which the year of 364 days was divided into four equal quarters of 91 days.

Armelin's calendar proposal was discussed chiefly under the auspices of the Société astronomique de France in 1887 and recently in the French Academy of Sciences.

== Structure ==
1. The year is divided into four quarters of three months each, and the arrangements for the first quarter repeat in each of the other quarters. The first and second month of each quarter have thirty days, and the third month 31 days. This accounts for 91 days in each quarter, or 364 days in all.
2. The remaining day in ordinary years is "New Year's Day". It is given no other descriptive title. It does not belong to any week or any month. It begins the year. January 1 is the day following New Year's Day.
3. The 366th day of leap year is likewise an extra day, bearing an appropriate descriptive name, perhaps "Leap Day", but no week-day name, nor is it a part of any month. It is the day following December 31, and the day preceding New Year's Day. This is the only significant difference from the later Invariable Calendar, which has the leap day in the middle of the year. It is assumed to be a holiday — it occurs once every four years. It could follow June 31, if preferred.
4. January 1 falls on Monday, as do April 1, July 1, and October 1. The second months in each quarter (February, May, August and November) begin always on Wednesday; and the third months in each quarter (March, June, September and December) begin always on Friday. The first day of the month never falls on Sunday; the 15th day of the month never falls on Sunday; the 30th day of the month never falls on Sunday; the last day of each quarter — the 31st of March, June, September, December — always falls on Sunday. The 30-day months always have four Sundays each; and the 31-day months always have five Sundays each. The number of business days (non-weekends) in each month is 26.
5. Since 91 is a multiple of 7, each quarter has 13 weeks and begins on the same day of week.
6. The calendar is therefore perennial, since the dates of the year always fall on the same weekday, and the same calendar table represents every year.

Year layout by months and days
Month	01	02	03	04	05	06	07	08	09	10	11	12	13	14	15	16	17	18	19	20	21	22	23	24	25	26	27	28	29	30	31
New Years Day
January	Mo	Tu	We	Th	Fr	Sa	Su	Mo	Tu	We	Th	Fr	Sa	Su	Mo	Tu	We	Th	Fr	Sa	Su	Mo	Tu	We	Th	Fr	Sa	Su	Mo	Tu	—
February	We	Th	Fr	Sa	Su	Mo	Tu	We	Th	Fr	Sa	Su	Mo	Tu	We	Th	Fr	Sa	Su	Mo	Tu	We	Th	Fr	Sa	Su	Mo	Tu	We	Th	—
March	Fr	Sa	Su	Mo	Tu	We	Th	Fr	Sa	Su	Mo	Tu	We	Th	Fr	Sa	Su	Mo	Tu	We	Th	Fr	Sa	Su	Mo	Tu	We	Th	Fr	Sa	Su
April	Mo	Tu	We	Th	Fr	Sa	Su	Mo	Tu	We	Th	Fr	Sa	Su	Mo	Tu	We	Th	Fr	Sa	Su	Mo	Tu	We	Th	Fr	Sa	Su	Mo	Tu	—
May	We	Th	Fr	Sa	Su	Mo	Tu	We	Th	Fr	Sa	Su	Mo	Tu	We	Th	Fr	Sa	Su	Mo	Tu	We	Th	Fr	Sa	Su	Mo	Tu	We	Th	—
June	Fr	Sa	Su	Mo	Tu	We	Th	Fr	Sa	Su	Mo	Tu	We	Th	Fr	Sa	Su	Mo	Tu	We	Th	Fr	Sa	Su	Mo	Tu	We	Th	Fr	Sa	Su
July	Mo	Tu	We	Th	Fr	Sa	Su	Mo	Tu	We	Th	Fr	Sa	Su	Mo	Tu	We	Th	Fr	Sa	Su	Mo	Tu	We	Th	Fr	Sa	Su	Mo	Tu	—
August	We	Th	Fr	Sa	Su	Mo	Tu	We	Th	Fr	Sa	Su	Mo	Tu	We	Th	Fr	Sa	Su	Mo	Tu	We	Th	Fr	Sa	Su	Mo	Tu	We	Th	—
September	Fr	Sa	Su	Mo	Tu	We	Th	Fr	Sa	Su	Mo	Tu	We	Th	Fr	Sa	Su	Mo	Tu	We	Th	Fr	Sa	Su	Mo	Tu	We	Th	Fr	Sa	Su
October	Mo	Tu	We	Th	Fr	Sa	Su	Mo	Tu	We	Th	Fr	Sa	Su	Mo	Tu	We	Th	Fr	Sa	Su	Mo	Tu	We	Th	Fr	Sa	Su	Mo	Tu	—
November	We	Th	Fr	Sa	Su	Mo	Tu	We	Th	Fr	Sa	Su	Mo	Tu	We	Th	Fr	Sa	Su	Mo	Tu	We	Th	Fr	Sa	Su	Mo	Tu	We	Th	—
December	Fr	Sa	Su	Mo	Tu	We	Th	Fr	Sa	Su	Mo	Tu	We	Th	Fr	Sa	Su	Mo	Tu	We	Th	Fr	Sa	Su	Mo	Tu	We	Th	Fr	Sa	Su
Leap Day

Quarter layout by weeks
Q1 month	Q2 month	Q3 month	Q4 month	Mon	Tue	Wed	Thu	Fri	Sat	Sun
January	April	July	October	01	02	03	04	05	06	07
January	April	July	October	08	09	10	11	12	13	14
January	April	July	October	15	16	17	18	19	20	21
January	April	July	October	22	23	24	25	26	27	28
January	April	July	October	29	30	—				
February	May	August	November	—		01	02	03	04	05
February	May	August	November	06	07	08	09	10	11	12
February	May	August	November	13	14	15	16	17	18	19
February	May	August	November	20	21	22	23	24	25	26
February	May	August	November	27	28	29	30	—		
March	June	September	December	—				01	02	03
March	June	September	December	04	05	06	07	08	09	10
March	June	September	December	11	12	13	14	15	16	17
March	June	September	December	18	19	20	21	22	23	24
March	June	September	December	25	26	27	28	29	30	31

== Advantages and disadvantages ==
Advantages include that the months are nearly equal in length and have the same number of business days, and that each day falls on the same day of the week each year. The day of the week on which each month starts can be memorized. Thanksgiving Day falls always on November 30.

A major disadvantage is for sabbatarians, who are obliged to worship every seventh day. Their holy day will occur on a different weekday every year.

Armelin's project received the first premium of the French Astronomical Society. The World Calendar, roughly identical, has been promoted by the World Calendar Association since 1930.
