= Donald Robertson (artist) =

American artist and writer (born 1962)

- Born: 7 March 1962 (age 64)
- Education: Ontario College of Art and Design
- Spouse: Kim Gieske
- Awards: 2014 Instagrammer of the Year

Donald Robertson (born 7 March 1962) is an artist and creative director for Esteé Lauder Companies.

== Career ==
=== Beginning ===
In the 1980s, Robertson attended Ontario College of Art and Design but did not graduate. He was asked to leave for not adhering to realism, drawing people "longer and skinnier than they were."

When MAC Cosmetics launched in 1984, Robertson assisted with creative direction. In 1991, he moved to New York City and worked at Hearst Communications where he launched Marie Claire magazine in 1993. He then redesigned Cosmopolitan with editor Bonnie Fuller. Robertson then moved to Condé Nast where he worked with James Truman and S. I. Newhouse School of Public Communications on Glamour and Cargo. After Esteé Lauder Companies acquired MAC Cosmetics in 1998, Robertson continued to work with the brand, contributing to the creation of the MAC Viva Glam line in 1994. All of this line's profits are contributed to the Mac AIDS Fund.

In 2007, Robertson became a creative director at Esteé Lauder Companies. He has also done projects for Smashbox, Bobbi Brown, and Bergdorf Goodman. In 2014, Robertson completed an artist-in-residency at Eric Firestone Gallery, and in August 2016, he collaborated with Amber Rose to launch Flirt Cosmetics, a direct-to-consumer cosmetics brand.

=== Collaborations ===
In 2014, Robertson partnered with the ASPCA to design products with profits benefiting the foundation. In 2015, he worked with the company again on their Save the Bees campaign, creating T-shirts that raised money for the UK organization Buglife. In 2016, he collaborated with Bloomingdales, designing a sweater with a portion of profits going to the Breast Cancer Research Foundation.

In 2014, Robertson partnered with J. Crew to create a line of graphic T-shirts. That same year, Robertson collaborated with fashion designer Giles Deacon of Giles Deacon Couture, creating a flamingo motif for the Giles Resort '15 collection. This followed his work on the Giles S/S '14 collection for which he designed its lip motif. Robertson also participated in an art event at the French boutique Colette.

In 2015, Robertson collaborated with the New York-based retail shop STORY on its 26th installation. Aside from Robertson's art, products featuring his designs included those by Canada Goose, Warby Parker, S'well Bottle, and Smashbox Cosmetics, among others. In November of the following year, Robertson launched a capsule collection with Junk Food Clothing Co., which featured a range of women's long and short sleeved T-shirts, tank tops, and baseball shirts, as well as men's T-shirts and children's T-shirts and onesies.

=== Author ===
In August 2015, Robertson published his first children's book Mitford at the Fashion Zoo, which follows Mitford the giraffe on his adventures at COVER magazine in the New York City fashion industry, which Robertson calls the zoo. The book's North American launch was held at Hot Renfrew in January 2017. Robertson wrote a second book called Mitford at the Hollywood Zoo, which documents Mitford's experience at the Academy Zoowards.

In September 2017, he published Donald: The Book with Assouline Publishing. The book features pieces from his collections.

== Awards ==
Robertson posts his art on social media, which often depicts satirical fashion scenes and events. In 2014, Robertson was nominated for the CFDA "Instagrammer of the Year" award.

== Personal life ==
Robertson is married to Kim Gieske, an interior designer, and the couple have five children. They moved to Dallas, Texas in 2020.
