= Paul-Émile =

Paul-Émile may refer to:

- Paul-Émile Allard (1920–1995), Canadian provincial politician
- Paul Émile Appell (1855–1930), French mathematician, Rector of the University of Paris
- Paul-Émile Bécat (1885–1960), French painter, printmaker and engraver, awarded first prize in the Prix de Rome in 1920
- Paul Émile Berthon (1846–1909), French landscape painter
- Paul-Emile Bibeault (1919–1970), ice hockey goaltender
- Paul Emile Biyaga (born 1987), Cameroonian football striker
- Paul-Émile Lecoq de Boisbaudran (1838–1912), French chemist who discovered gallium, samarium and dysprosium
- Paul-Émile Borduas (1905–1960), Québec painter known for his abstract paintings
- Paul-Émile Botta (1802–1870), Italian-born French scientist, Consul in Mosul, discovered the ruins of Dur-Sharrukin
- Paul-Émile Boutigny (1853–1929), French painter who specialized in military subjects
- Paul Émile Chabas (1869–1937), French painter and illustrator and member of the Académie des Beaux-Arts
- Paul Emile Chappuis (1816–1887), photographer, an inventor and manufacturer of daylight reflectors
- Paul-Émile Charbonneau (1922–2014), Canadian Prelate of Roman Catholic Church
- Benoît Paul Émile Clapeyron (1799–1864), French engineer and physicist, one of the founders of thermodynamics
- Paul-Émile Côté (1909–1970), Liberal party member of the House of Commons of Canada
- Paul-Émile Dalpé (1919–1994), C.M., Canadian labour unionist and nurse
- Paul Emile Diou (1855–1914), French general
- Paul Émile Gallant (1944–2011), Canadian entrepreneur who developed three-dimensional jigsaw puzzles
- Paul-Émile Janson (1872–1944), francophone Belgian liberal politician and Prime Minister (1937–1938)
- Jean-François-Paul-Emile d'Oultremont (1679–1737), Count of Oultremont and of the Holy Roman Empire, Baron of Han-sur-Lesse
- Paul-Émile Lamarche (1881–1918), lawyer and political figure in Quebec
- Paul-Émile Léger CC GOQ GCM PSS (1904–1991), Canadian Cardinal of the Roman Catholic Church
- Paul-Émile d'Entremont, Canadian documentary filmmaker, known for his 2012 film about LGBT refugees, Last Chance
- Paul Émile de Puydt (1810–1891), a writer whose contributions included work in botany and economics
- Paul Emile Rousseau (1929–2001), car dealer and political figure in Saskatchewan, Canada
- Pierre Paul Émile Roux FRS (1853–1933), French physician, bacteriologist and immunologist
- Paul-Emile Saadé (born 1933), Emeritus Maronite Eparch of the Maronite Catholic Eparchy of Batroun
- Paul-Émile Sauvageau (1918–2003), Canadian politician
- Paul-Émile de Souza (1930–1999), Beninese army officer and political figure
- Paul-Émile Victor (1907–1995), French ethnologist and explorer

== See also ==
- Prix Paul-Émile-Borduas, award by the Government of Quebec that is part of the Prix du Québec, given to individuals who are artists or craftsman in the fields of visual arts, of the trades of art, architecture and the design
- French Polar Institute Paul-Emile Victor, the organization leading the French National Antarctic Program since 1992
