= Donald Robertson (British administrator) =

Lieutenant-Colonel Sir Donald Robertson, KCSI (24 June 1847 – 13 October 1930) was a British military officer and member of the Indian Political Service. He was Resident of Mysore from 1896 to 1903.

His only son was Major-General Donald Elphinston Robertson, CB, DSO (1879–1953).
