= Marco Mastrofini =

Italian priest, philosopher and mathematician (1763–1845)

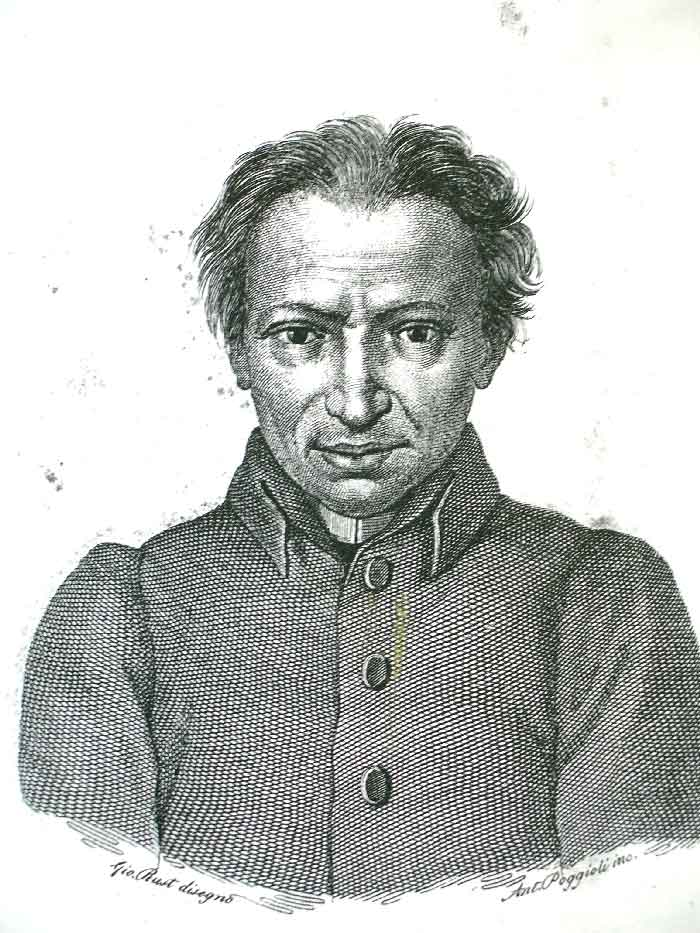
Portrait of Macro Mastrofini

Marco Mastrofini (1763–1845) was an Italian priest, philosopher and mathematician.

== History of work ==
In 1834 Mastrofini offered to create for the world an "eternal" calendar, and demonstrated that its invariance can be achieved only by application of special days that would not belong to any week or month. He offered to establish a calendar year of 364 days, always beginning on a Sunday, split into 52 seven-day weeks, and to place the 365th day of each year at the end of December, considering it "extra-calendrical," special, or out of week.

He planned one more special intercalary day in a leap year, and to place it in the middle of a year, between the last day of June and the first day of July, or following the first special day.

== Influence on other calendars ==
His work significantly influenced the Armelin's calendar and calendar reform proposal by Auguste Comte in 1849.
