= Toussaint-Dieudonné Sauveur =

Belgian physician and professor

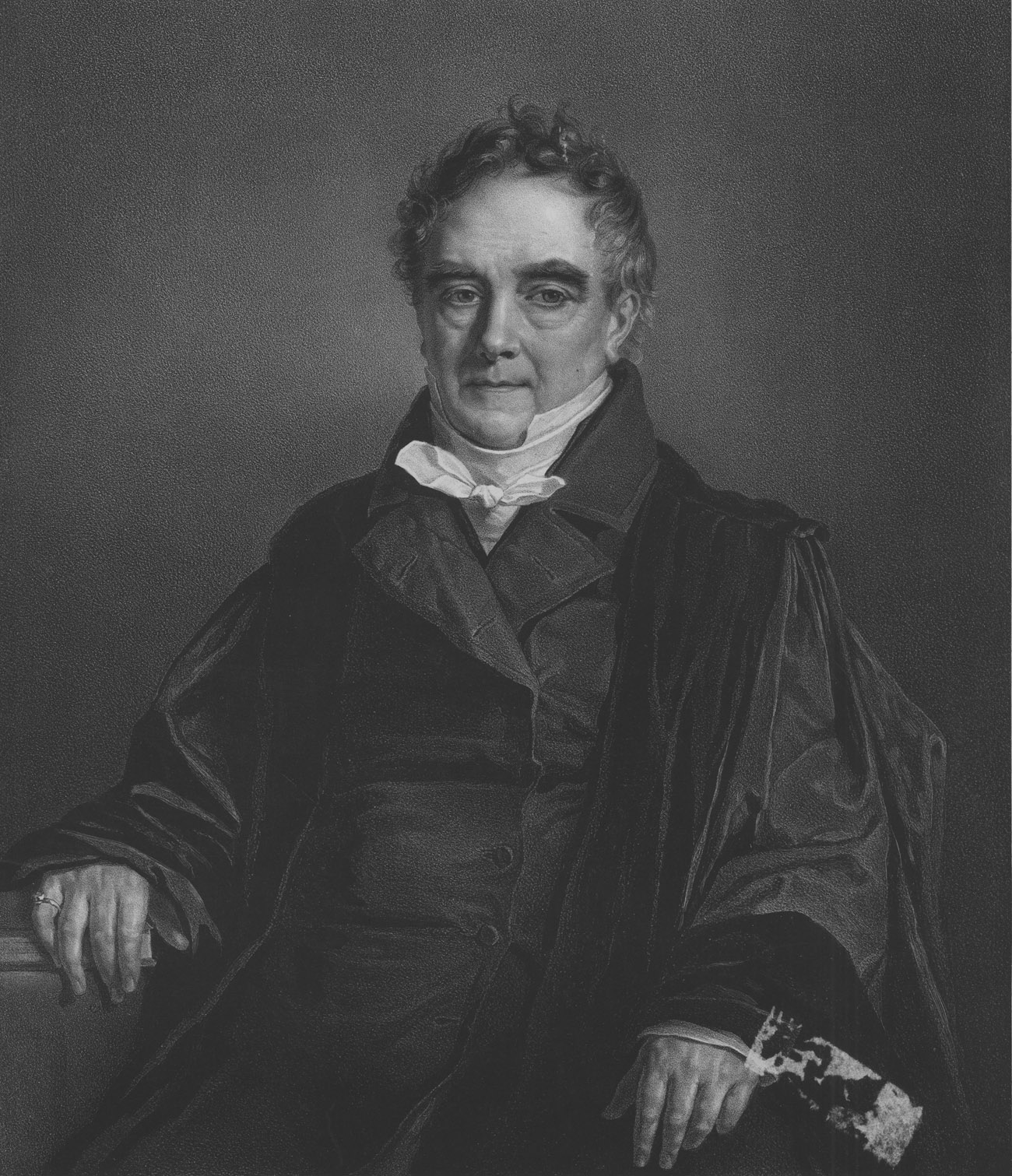
- Born: 26 April 1766; Liège (Principality of Liège)
- Died: 27 January 1838 (aged 71); Liège (Belgium)
- Burial place: Robermont Cemetery
- Education: Faculty of Medicine, Paris (1789–1792) Utrecht University (1792–1793)
- Occupations: Doctor, university professor
- Children: 2

Toussaint-Dieudonné Sauveur (26 April 1766 - 27 January 1838) was a Belgian medical doctor and professor. After studying in Liège, Toussaint-Dieudonné Sauveur went to Paris to pursue a literary education. After graduating, he was appointed to teach at the University of Angers, where he earned a Master of Arts. Between 1789 and 1792, the French Revolution led him to study medicine in Paris; in 1793, he received a medical degree in Utrecht.

In 1808, he was appointed physician to the Lycée Impérial in Liège, which opened many doors for him, including the post of president of the medical jury for the Ourthe department.

Toussaint-Dieudonné Sauveur became a professor of medicine at the newly founded University of Liège in 1817. He also became the first rector for a one-year term. He taught several disciplines, including general pathology and the special pathology of internal diseases. He returned as rector between 1829 and 1830, but lost his position in 1835 following a reshuffling of teaching duties, probably due to his Orangism background.

== Biography ==
=== Studies and practice of medicine ===
Toussaint-Dieudonné Sauveur was born in Liège on 26 April 1766. (Note: At the time, Liège was part of the Principality of Liège, a state of the Holy Roman Empire.) He was the ninth child of a prominent Liège family. He completed his secondary education at the Collège de Visé, then run by the Congregation of the Oratory of Jesus and Mary Immaculate. He left for Paris to further his literary education, where he remained for three years. The French Oratory then sent him to the Collège de Juilly to teach the humanities. He was subsequently offered a position at the University of Angers, where he obtained a Master of Arts degree. (Note: This title, which allows you to teach humanities and philosophy, is the equivalent of a Doctor of Letters.) During his time in France, he had the opportunity to interact with numerous individuals who would later play a role in the French Revolution, including Joseph Fouché, with whom he developed a close relationship, and Maximilien de Robespierre. He also formed friendships with Gaspard de Chabrol, Auguste Creuzé de Lesser, and Jean-Joseph Dessolles. Despite his esteemed friendships, Toussaint-Dieudonné Sauveur remained a modest doctor, with "the honorable ambition of owing nothing but himself". This did not prevent him from helping many "oratorians" during the restoration of the Bourbon dynasty in France and their exile in Belgium.

Faced with the possibility of a challenging situation, particularly the potential impact on educational institutions run by religious communities, Toussaint-Dieudonné Sauveur began studying medicine in Paris between 1789 and 1792. He had to suspend his studies temporarily during the Reign of Terror. Moreover, the invasion of the Netherlands by the Austrian army led to a disruption in his family's ties and a loss of financial resources. He hurriedly left France, with difficulty, as obtaining a passport was complicated and any application was suspect. (Note: Revolutionary France required passports to curb emigration. Without one, all border crossings were illegal and punishable by death.) Fortunately, he received one through various contacts, thanks to Jean-Antoine Rossignol, a revolutionary militant. He spent little time with his family and soon left for Holland to finish his studies in Utrecht. He was awarded a medical degree in 1793 at the age of 27. He promptly returned to Liège, where he was employed at the Saint-Abraham hospice. However, he was compelled to leave this position due to political considerations. He was denounced as having an emigrant brother, prompting him to step aside. Toussaint-Dieudonné Sauveur decided to withdraw from all public employment. He treated civilians and enjoyed a large clientele.

In 1808, shortly after settling in Liège, Toussaint-Dieudonné Sauveur was appointed physician to the lycée impérial. No recorded deaths were among the school's 200 to 250 students aged 8 to 17 during his tenure.

His skills as a doctor led to his appointment to the medical jury of the Ourthe department, where he eventually became chairman. Fortunately, he was not dismissed when Belgium joined the United Kingdom of the Netherlands in 1814.

=== Career at the University of Liège ===
In 1817, William I, King of the Netherlands, founded the University of Liège, and Toussaint-Dieudonné Sauveur took over the chair of medicine. He also became the university's first rector for a one-year term. (Note: His power is limited, because under the Dutch system, the College of Curators is in fact the University's main authority, not the Rector.) The previous year, he had been commissioned by the king, along with Nicolas-Gabriel Ansiaux and Charles Delvaux de Fenffe, to create the Belgian pharmacopeia. In 1817, he was also appointed president of the provincial medical commission.

As a professor, Toussaint-Dieudonné Sauveur significantly contributed to various disciplines, including general pathology, special pathology of internal diseases, hygiene, therapeutics, and medical clinic. His dedication and expertise were further demonstrated when he served as rector again between 1829 and 1830. During this period, he was a member of the "commission charged by the government with examining and revising the laws, decrees, and regulations previously promulgated on the practice of the healing art", leaving a lasting impact on medicine and academia.

He was the first and last rector of the university before the Belgian Revolution. Toussaint-Dieudonné Sauveur was a member of the Liège Orangism. Trained in the disciplines of the Lumières, the first teachers were full of praise for King William, and their situation was much better than under the Ourthe prefects. As part of his oath, the rector swore to "do everything that depends on him, in his capacity, for the good of the State, the King, and the University," while the professors did not swear for the good of the King. Toussaint-Dieudonné Sauveur deliberately sided with the Orangistes. Trained by the Oratorians, a congregation "composed of men without intrigue or desire for domination," he feared seeing "the pontifical see enter the throne of Belgium" and the "militias of Rome."

=== At the end of his life ===
In 1835, following a reorganization of teaching duties, Toussaint-Dieudonné Sauveur was relieved of his professorship, which caused him significant distress. The decision perplexed the academic community, which came as a surprise and was perceived as arbitrary. Toussaint-Dieudonné Sauveur was upset, but he remained discreet. His Orangemen background and his lack of familiarity with the "everyday, down-to-earth truth" that neither the Belgians nor the people of Liège liked the Dutch during the Belgian Revolution undoubtedly contributed to his dismissal.

Despite being appointed Professor Emeritus in 1836, he retained no academic responsibilities. He died on 27 January 1838 in Liège at the age of 71.

== Private life ==
Toussaint-Dieudonné Sauveur had two sons. The eldest, Dieudonné-Jean-Joseph Sauveur (1797–1862), was also a doctor but subsequently pursued an administrative career in Brussels, ultimately becoming Inspector General of the Civil Health Service. He was also interested in paleobotany and was able to identify several fossils. His second son, Jean-Thomas-Hyacinthe Sauveur (1801–1888), was also a doctor and professor at the University of Liège.

== Research and publications ==
Toussaint-Dieudonné Sauveur published a few works. His numerous patients and courses left him with limited time for writing. Notwithstanding, he was a founding member of the Bulletin de la Société des sciences physiques et médicales de Liège in 1806. Although these were not scientific publications, he wrote numerous observations published in periodicals.

He was appointed a member of the Société médicale d'émulation de Paris at the recommendation of Professor Paul-Joseph Barthez. He also became a member of the Société des sciences naturelles et médicales de Paris et d'Orléans. He is a member of the Société d'émulation de Liège. In 1834, he was elected a member of the Société des Sciences, des Arts et des Lettres de Mons.

He was known for his dedication to lifelong learning for himself and his students. He is a progressive and eclectic scholar. One of his mottos, attributed to Ludwig Gottfried Klein (de), is "I am no more attached to ancient physicians than to modern ones; I use both indifferently when they follow the truth: an often-repeated experience is my main guide."

== Bibliography ==
- Lanneau, Catherine (2018). "Une université à Liège ? Regards sur les premières années d'enseignement supérieur en Cité ardente (1811–1835)". Revue belge de Philologie et d'Histoire (in French). Vol. 96. pp. 1253–1269. doi:10.3406/rbph.2018.9243.
- Florkin, Marcel; Halkin, Léon-Ernest (1967). Chronique de l'Université de Liège (in French). Liège: Université de Liège.
- Opsomer, Carmélia (2012). Delvaux ou Delvaux de Fenffe, Jean Charles (PDF) (in French). Vol. 11. Académie royale de Belgique, Bruxelles, Belgium. pp. 98–100.
- Association nationale pour l'encouragement et le développement de la littérature en Belgique (1838). "Notice nécrologique sur le docteur T. D. Sauveur, professeur-émérite à l'université de Liège". Revue belge (in French). Liège. pp. 353–368.
- Académie royale des sciences, des lettres et des beaux-arts de Belgique; et al. (Vanlair Constant) (1911). Biographie nationale (PDF) (in French). Vol. 21. Académie royale des sciences, des lettres et des beaux-arts de Belgique. pp. 464–468.
