= Donald J. Robertson =

Scottish cognitive-behavioral psychotherapist and author

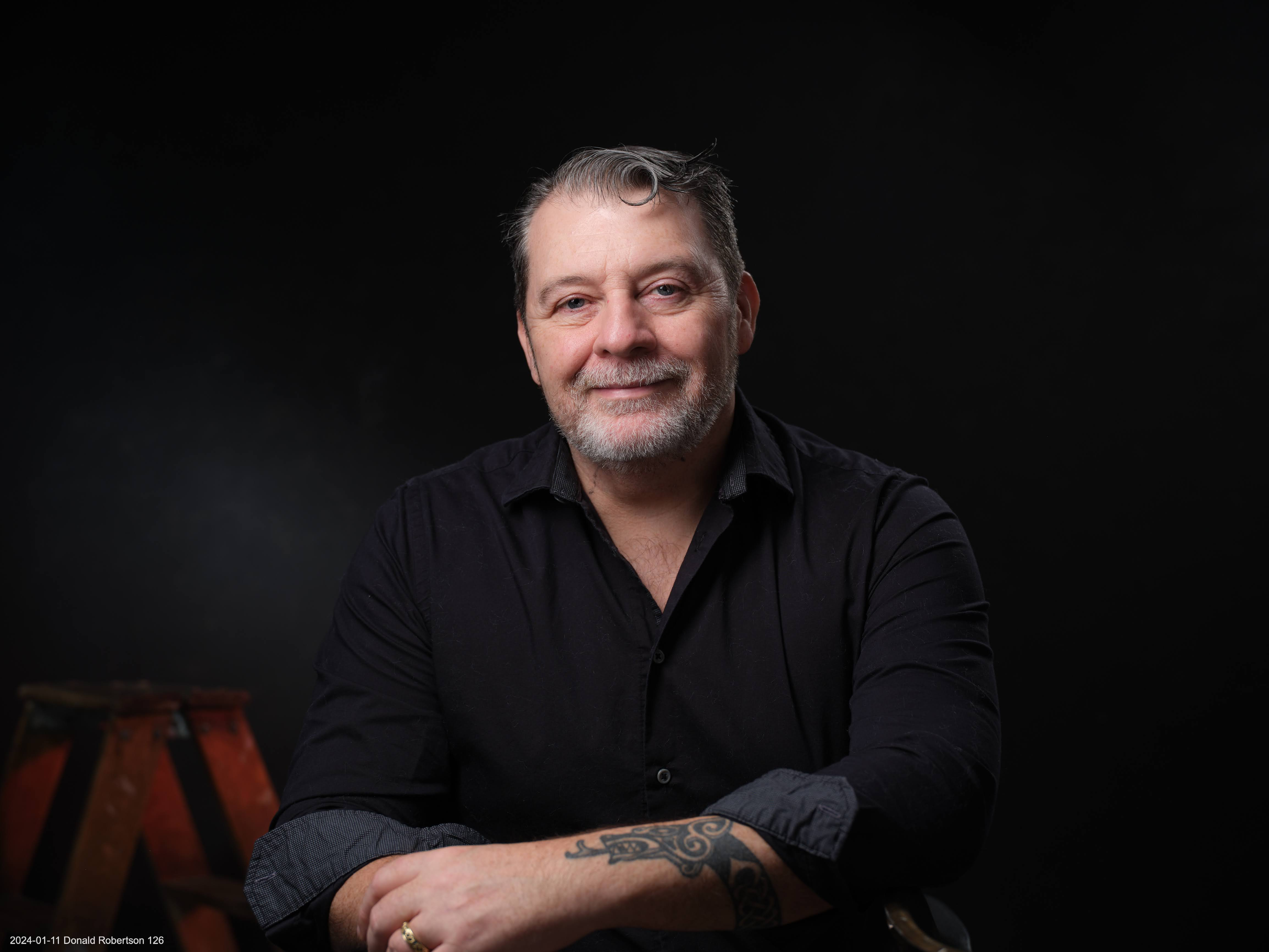
- Born: December 27, 1972 (age 53)
- Occupations: Psychotherapist, author
- Notable work: The Philosophy of Cognitive Behavioural Therapy; How to Think Like a Roman Emperor; How to Think Like Socrates
- Website: Donald Robertson

Donald John Robertson is a Scottish-born cognitive-behavioral psychotherapist and author, known for his work in integrating modern cognitive-behavioral therapy (CBT) with Ancient Greek and Roman philosophy, particularly Stoicism. He has written on Stoicism's relevance to modern therapeutic practices, and his books have contributed to Stoic philosophy in contemporary psychology. He is the author of Stoicism and the Art of Happiness and The Philosophy of Cognitive Behavioural Therapy: Stoic Philosophy as Rational and Cognitive Psychotherapy. His writing on Stoicism and Contemporary Psychology has been featured in Forbes, The Wall Street Journal, the BBC and The Times.

== Biography ==
He was born in Ayrshire, Scotland, and later moved to England, where he worked in London for many years before emigrating to Canada, where he now resides in Quebec. After obtaining a degree in philosophy from Aberdeen University, he completed a masters in philosophy and psychotherapy at the Centre for Psychotherapeutic Studies in Sheffield University, before training in several modalities of counselling and psychotherapy. He holds experience in the treatment of anxiety disorders and the use of evidence-based psychological skills, with a specific focus on CBT.

== Career ==
After studying at the University of Sheffield, he advanced his training in psychotherapy and counseling, initially working as a school counselor for a youth drug project in South London. He then established a private clinic on Harley Street, London, focusing on anxiety disorders, and ran a training school for psychotherapists. Throughout this period, Robertson authored articles and presented on topics like Stoicism in psychotherapy, with a 2005 publication titled Stoic Philosophy as Psychotherapy in the British Association for Counselling and Psychotherapy journal.

Between 2006 and 2010, he contributed to a government-led Coping with Noise research project, where he developed online CBT protocols for managing stress and insomnia, with findings published in peer-reviewed journals. In 2010, Robertson’s book The Philosophy of Cognitive-Behavioural Therapy was published, becoming a key work in Stoicism and CBT.

Continuing his training, Robertson earned a diploma from King’s College London and published Build Your Resilience (2012) and Stoicism and the Art of Happiness (2013) through Hodder & Stoughton.

He is one of the founding members of the Modern Stoicism nonprofit organization, and the founder and president of the Plato’s Academy Centre, a nonprofit organization based in Greece.

== Works and Themes ==
Robertson is the author of several books on philosophy and psychology, including The Philosophy of Cognitive Behavioural Therapy, How to Think Like a Roman Emperor, and How to Think Like Socrates: Ancient Philosophy as a Way of Life in the Modern World. His works focus on applying ancient philosophical principles—particularly Stoicism and Socratic reasoning—to modern psychological challenges, self-improvement, and mental resilience.

=== Stoicism and Cognitive Behavioural Therapy ===
Robertson’s work explores the relationship between Stoicism and modern psychotherapy, particularly Cognitive Behavioral Therapy (CBT). His book The Philosophy of Cognitive Behavioural Therapy examines how Stoic principles align with and influenced the development of CBT, highlighting their practical applications for managing emotions and developing psychological resilience.

How to Think Like a Roman Emperor combines elements of biography, philosophy, and modern psychology, using the life and writings of the Roman emperor and Stoic philosopher Marcus Aurelius to illustrate Stoic principles in action. The book has been noted for its accessible style and its integration of Stoic philosophy with modern psychological techniques.

=== Socratic Philosophy and Modern Applications ===
In November 2024, Robertson published How to Think Like Socrates: Ancient Philosophy as a Way of Life in the Modern World, which explores the enduring relevance of Socratic thought and its practical applications for modern life. The book examines Socrates’ dialectical method, his emphasis on rational inquiry, and his commitment to virtue, framing them as tools for improving self-awareness, critical thinking, and emotional resilience.

Robertson draws on historical sources, including Plato’s dialogues and Xenophon’s accounts, to reconstruct Socrates’ philosophical techniques and demonstrate their applicability to contemporary challenges such as decision-making, personal development, and mental well-being. He also explores connections between Socratic dialogue and modern psychological disciplines, particularly CBT, which shares a similar emphasis on questioning unexamined beliefs and fostering rational self-reflection.

The book has been praised for making classical philosophy accessible to a general audience while maintaining scholarly rigor. Critics have highlighted its engaging narrative and practical insights, noting that its detailed historical context adds depth for readers interested in the ancient world.

== Selected bibliography ==
- How to Think Like Socrates: Ancient Philosophy as a Way of Life in the Modern World (1st ed.). New York: St. Martin's Press. 2024. p. 368. ISBN 978-1-250-28050-3.
- How to Think Like a Roman Emperor: The Stoic Philosophy of Marcus Aurelius (1st ed.). New York: St. Martin's Press. 2019. p. 304. ISBN 978-1-250-19662-0.
- Stoicism and the Art of Happiness: A Teach Yourself Guide (1st ed.). McGraw-Hill Education. 2014. ISBN 978-1444187106.
- The Philosophy of Cognitive-Behavioural Therapy (CBT): Stoic Philosophy as Rational and Cognitive Psychotherapy (2nd ed.). Routledge. 2019. p. 252. ISBN 978-0367219147.
- Verissimus: The Stoic Philosophy of Marcus Aurelius. St. Martin's Press. 2022. p. 272. ISBN 978-1250270955.
- Robertson, Donald J. (2024). Marcus Aurelius: The Stoic Emperor (Ancient Lives). Yale University Press. p. 248. ISBN 978-0300256666.
- Marcus, Aurelius; Robertson (Introduction), Donald (2020). Meditations: the ancient classic. Capstone classics. Hoboken, New Jersey: Wiley. ISBN 978-0-85708-846-8.
- "The Stoic influence on modern psychotherapy". The Routledge Handbook of the Stoic Tradition. 2016. p. 15. doi:10.4324/9781315771588-31. ISBN 9781315771588.
- Robertson, Donald J. (2018-05-08). The Practice of Cognitive-Behavioural Hypnotherapy: A Manual for Evidence-Based Clinical Hypnosis (1 ed.). Routledge. doi:10.4324/9780429482793. ISBN 978-0-429-48279-3.
