= Don Robertson (baseball) =

American baseball player (1930–2014)

- Right fielder
- Born: October 15, 1930; Harvey, Illinois, U.S.
- Died: April 11, 2014 (aged 83); Phoenix, Arizona, U.S.
- Batted: Left Threw: Left

MLB debut
- April 13, 1954, for the Chicago Cubs

Last MLB appearance
- May 23, 1954, for the Chicago Cubs

MLB statistics
- Games played: 14
- At bats: 6
- Hits: 0
- Stats at Baseball Reference

Teams
- Chicago Cubs (1954)

Donald Alexander Robertson (October 15, 1930 – April 11, 2014) was an American Major League Baseball player. Robertson played for the Chicago Cubs in 1954. He batted and threw left-handed.

He was signed by the Cubs as an amateur free agent in 1949.
