= Don Robertson (television announcer) =

American television announcer (1928–2021)

Donald Robertson (September 6, 1928 – January 8, 2021) was an American television announcer for the CBS television network. He was known as "The Voice Of CBS Sports", where he also voiced nearly every sporting event CBS had. Robertson also voiced the CBS network ID "This is CBS", along with promos for the sporting events that he would call.

== Early life and career ==
Educated at University of North Carolina, he once sang in the glee club with Andy Griffith.

After working as a radio reporter throughout high school and college, Robertson received a degree in communications in 1950. He went into the Air Force after college and served in Korea. In 1953, he left military service and returned to broadcasting, working for radio and television markets in North and South Carolina and Connecticut.

Robertson once worked for WBTV-TV in Charlotte, North Carolina when he got his big break. In 1961, he had moved to WBT (AM), where "I think I was on the air all day," he said. He did news, weather and sports for a morning show, and hosted a mid-day interview show. He also did play-by-play sports announcing for Davidson College.

Robertson was in New York announcing a basketball game between the college and New York University at Madison Square Garden when a producer with CBS Sports Spectacular invited him to auditions that were taking place while he was in town. About two days later, the station manager of WBT (AM) came in and said, ‘Congratulations on your new job, Don.’ I didn't want them to know I was auditioning, but he said CBS had called to make sure it was okay to hire me. So that's how I found out I had a job with CBS," he said.

Ultimately, Robertson then moved to CBS Sports. Management there had decided they wanted one voice that viewers could associate with all their sporting events, and the voice they chose was his.

As he advanced his career, Robertson also raised a family with his wife Mary, whom he married in 1951 after knowing her for six months.

== CBS Sports ==
Throughout his career, Robertson worked with Pat Summerall and Jack Whitaker. He voiced the World Series, The Masters, and every golf and tennis tournament for which CBS had the rights.
