= Marcus Atilius Regulus (disambiguation) =

Marcus Atilius Regulus may refer to the following consuls of Rome in the third century BC:

- Marcus Atilius Regulus (consul 294 BC), first man from the gens Atilia to become consul of Rome.
- Marcus Atilius Regulus (consul 267 BC) (died 250 BC), son of the above, consul and general who fought in the First Punic War
- Marcus Atilius Regulus (consul 227 BC), supposedly the elder son of the second Regulus, consul and grandson of Marcus Atilius, consul in 227 BC and consul suffect in 217 BC
