= Swaminarayan Bhashyam =

Five-volume commentary on Hindu scriptures

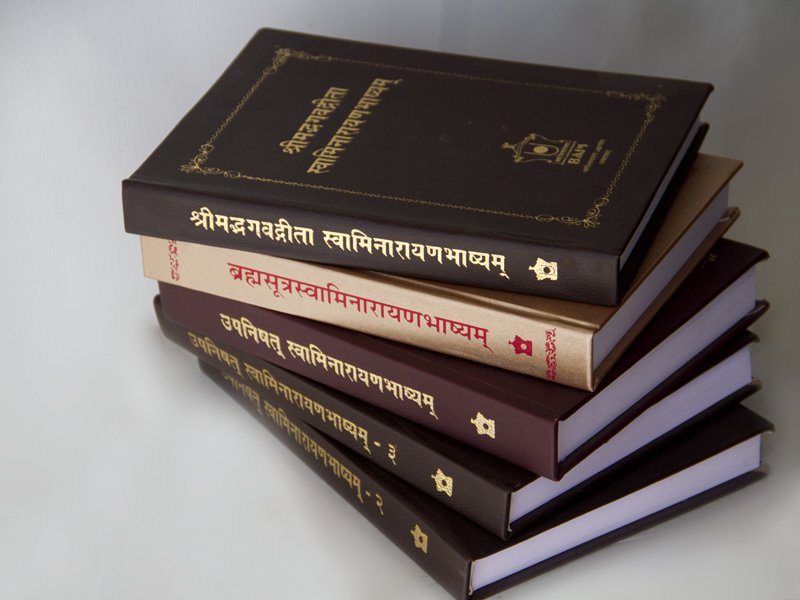
- The Swaminarayan Bhashyam 5-Volume Commentary

Information
- Religion: Hinduism - Swaminarayan
- Author: Bhadreshdas Swami
- Language: Sanskrit

The Swaminarayan Bhashyam (Svāminārāyaṇabhāṣyam) is a five-volume Sanskrit bhashya, or commentary, on the Prasthanatrayi (Prasthānatrayī) - the ten principal Upanishads (Upaniṣads), the Bhagavad Gita (Bhagavadgītā), and the Brahmasutras (Brahmasūtras) - which establishes the principles taught by Swaminarayan as perceived by the BAPS.

Acharyas, including Shankara, Ramanuja, Madhva, Nimbarka, and Vallabha, all wrote commentaries on the Prasthanatrayi to establish their own school of thought. Swaminarayan did not author a Sanskrit commentary himself, but he interpreted Hindu texts in discourses found in the Vachanamrut.

The Swaminarayan Bhashyam establishes the following: the five metaphysical eternal entities (jiva, ishvara, maya, Aksharbrahman, and Parabrahman), the ontological distinction between Aksharbrahman and Parabrahman, the exposition of spiritual knowledge (brahmavidya), and the means to liberation through identifying with Aksharbrahman and exclusive devotion to Parabrahman. Bhadreshdas Swami's commentarial work is the first Vedanta commentary to bring forth Swaminarayan's philosophical teachings within the school of Vedanta.

In 2005, after the completion of his Ph.D. in Sanskrit, Bhadreshdas Swami, an ordained monk of the Bochasanwasi Akshar Purushottam Swaminarayan Sanstha, was instructed by Pramukh Swami Maharaj to author Sanskrit commentaries on the Prasthanatrayi. The commentary was completed and presented to Pramukh Swami Maharaj on 17 December 2007 in Ahmedabad during the BAPS Centenary Celebration. Bhadreshdas Swami holds a Ph.D. in Sanskrit from Karnataka University and was awarded a D.Litt and Mahamahopadhyaya honorific by Kavikulaguru Kalidas Sanskrit University in 2010 for the Swaminarayan Bhashyam.

On 31 July 2017, the Shri Kashi Vidvat Parishad (Śrī Kāśī Vidvat Pariṣad), a council of specialists recognized throughout India for their expertise in Vedic literature, acknowledged Swaminarayan's darsana (view, philosophy) on the Akshar-Purushottam distinction as a distinct view within Vedanta. The council also recognized Bhadreshdas Swami as an acharya in line with Shankara, Ramanuja, Madhva, and Vallabha, and as the only Sanskrit scholar in history to write both a commentary on the Prasthanatrayi and a vadagrantha, a Sanskrit text which offers systematic exposition of and justification for the philosophical principles found in the Swaminarayan Bhashyam.

In 2018, at a plenary session of the 17th World Sanskrit Conference in Vancouver, Canada, professor Ashok Aklujkar also acclaimed that Swaminarayan's Akshar-Purushottam distinction is a separate darshan within Vedanta.

== The Vedanta commentarial tradition ==
=== Terminology ===
A bhashya (or bhashyam) in the Vedanta (Vedānta) tradition is an exposition or commentary on sutra (sūtra) texts, such as the Brahmasutras (Brahmasūtras), or sacred texts, such as the Upanishads (Upaniṣad). A commentary presents aphorisms or verses, as read in the text, followed by a detailed exposition on each term to reveal the author's philosophy.

The bhashyakara (bhāṣyakara), or commentator, in the Vedanta tradition must have mastery of both the Sanskrit language as well as of the six schools of Hindu philosophy (śaḍdarśana, shaddarshan) - Sankhya (Śāṅkhya), Yoga (Yoga), Vaisheshika (Vaiśeṣika), Nyaya (Nyāya), Mimamsa (Mīmāṃsā), and Vedanta (Vedānta).

Vedanta, which literally means the end of the Vedas (Veda + anta), refers to the essence of the Vedas found in the Upanishads. The Vedas are considered to hold the highest scriptural authority by most Hindus.

The term Prasthanatrayi (Prasthānatrayī) is the combination of the Sanskrit words prasthana (prasthāna) and trayi (trayī). Prasthana means a starting-point or source, and specifically in Vedanta, a text by which philosophy is established. Trayi means three, and refers to the three scriptures which establish Vedanta darshans (darśana, a system of practice that helps one know, experience, and realize the truth; school of thought), known as the Prasthanatrayi, are the Upanishads (Upaniṣad), Shrimad Bhagavad Gita (Śrimadbhagavadgītā), and Brahmasutras (Brahmasūtras).

=== Foundational Vedanta scriptures - the Prasthanatrayi ===
Within the Vedanta school of thought, the inquisition of spiritual knowledge (brahmavidya, brahmavidyā) and liberation (moksha, mokṣa) must be grounded in the Prasthanatrayi. Each Vedanta darshan, such as Advaita (Advaita), Dvaita (Dvaita), Vishishtadvaita (Viśiṣṭādvaita), or Akshar-Purushottam Darshan (Akṣar-Puruṣottama Darśana), has therefore established its philosophy by interpreting the Prasthanatrayi.

==== Upanishad ====
The first prasthana is the Upanishads (Upaniṣad), which are found at the end of the Vedas. It also known as the shruti-prasthana (śrutiprasthāna), and it takes a privileged position amongst the three scriptures of the Prasthanatrayi as a primary source for Vedanta. The Sanskrit verb Upanishadyate (Upaniṣadyate) can be understood to mean “to attain or to know brahmavidya.” Thus, an Upanishad is a text by which the knowledge of Brahman can be attained or known, or brahmavidya (brahmavidyā), which is believed to be the knowledge intended and required for liberation. Although there are hundreds of Upanishads, there are ten principal Upanishads which are believed to focus on brahmavidya. The ten Upanishads (Note: The 10 principal Upanishads are listed in the verse: ईश-केन-कठ-प्रश्न-मुण्ड-माण्डुक्य-तित्तिरिः | ऐतरेयं च चान्द्योग्यं बृहदारण्यकं दश || “īśa-kena-kaṭha-praśna-muṇḍa-māṇḍūkya-tittiriḥ | aitareyaṃ ca chāndogyaṃ bṛhadāraṇyakaṃ daśa”) central to the Prasthanatrayi are: Ishavasya (Īśāvāsya), Kena (Kena), Katha (Kaṭha), Prashna (Praśna), Mundaka (Muṇḍaka), Mandukya (Māṇḍūkya), Taittiriya (Taittirīya), Aitareya (Aitareya), Chandogya (Chāndogya), and Bruhadaranyaka (Bṛhadāraṇyaka).

==== Bhagavad Gita ====
The second established text (prasthana) is the Shrimad Bhagavad Gita (Śrimadbhagavadgītā), the philosophical dialogue of Arjuna and Krishna right before battle. The Bhagavad Gita contains 700 verses and is located in the 18th chapter of the Mahabharata (Mahābhārata). Each chapter in the Bhagavad Gita traditionally ends with a verse which states that the Gita is a sacred text on yoga, centralized around the theme of Brahmavidya, and is therefore considered an Upanishad (Note: Each chapter ends with the verse: इति श्रिमद्भगवद्गितासूपनिषत्सु ब्रह्मविद्यायां योगशास्त्रे...; “iti śrīmadbhagavadgītāsūpaniṣatsu brahmavidyāyām yogaśastre…”), a text by which the knowledge of Brahman can be attained or known. As the Bhagavad Gita is part of the Mahabharata, this text holds a significant status among smruti (smṛti) scriptures and therefore is known as the smruti-prasthana (smṛtiprasthāna).

==== Brahmasutras ====
The third prasthana is the Brahmasutras (Brahmasūtras), authored by Badarayana Vyas (Bādarāyaṇa Vyāsa), which summarizes and systematizes the central themes found in the Upanishads. Badarayana structured the text into four chapters (adhyāyas) which discuss the nature of Brahman, Vedanta philosophy and other schools of thought, and the methods and nature of liberation. As various principles are debated in the text using logical reasoning, it is known as the tarka-prasthana (tarkaprasthāna), text of reason.

=== Qualities of a Vedanta commentary ===
Vedanta Bhashyas extract and elaborate metaphysics, epistemology, or philosophy from the Prasthanatrayi. Bhashyas should, by convention, also follow the Sanskrit grammar rules established by Panini (Pāṇini) in the Ashtadhyayi (Aṣṭādhyāyī).

To remain coherent, the commentator must first identify a leading theme as the subject from the root text (abhidheya, abhidheya), the principal purpose (prayojana, prayojana), and the relation between the two (sambhanda, sambhanda). Thereafter, the commentator can structure various sutras to follow a thematic order. The sutras do not have explicit labels but follow the pattern: 1) a statement of the topic (vishaya, viṣaya) 2) a statement of doubt (samshay, saṃśaya) 3) an opposing view with reasons (purvapaksha, pūrvapakṣa) 4) supporting claims with evidence (siddhanta, siddhānta) and 5) the purpose of the discussion regarding that topic, prayojana. Finally, within the formal structure, the author must establish coherence across the text.

Each consecutive chapter must be interrelated (sangati, saṅgati) and should follow one of the six types of criteria: 1) corollary - prasanga (prasaṅga) 2) prerequisite - upoddhata (upoddhāta) 3) causal dependence - hetutva (hetutva) removal of an obstacle to further inquiry - avasara (avasara) 5) common end is found in adjacent endings - nirvahakaikya (nirvāhakaikya) 6) the adjacent sections are joint with a common factor - karyaikya (kāryaikya).

=== Vedanta commentaries ===
In order for a school of thought (or darshan) to be established in Vedanta, the author must align their philosophy with the teachings of the Prasthanatrayi. Shankara (Śaṅkara) set the precedent of commenting on all three scriptures in the Prasthanatrayi. However, commentators who followed him did not always complete a commentary on all three texts, leaving those commentators’ disciples or others in his philosophical lineage to author commentaries on the remaining texts of the Prasthanatrayi.

In the late 8th or early 9th century, Shankara established the Advaita (Advaita) Darshan (absolute non-dualism) with his commentary on the Prasthanatrayi. In this school of thought, the belief is that there is only one metaphysical entity, Brahman. Shankara states that maya (māyā), or ignorance, and its creations are unreal. To realize oneself as Brahman, knowledge is the only means.

Ramanuja (Rāmānuja) was the founder of the Vishishtadvaita (Viśiṣṭādvaita) Darshan (11th to 12th century), also known as qualified non-dualism. The Vishishtadvaita Darshan posits three metaphysical entities: jiva (jiva, the self), prakriti or jagat (prakṛti, jagat, the insentient, primordial matter), and Brahman.

The 11th century theologian Nimbarka (Nimbārka) established the Dvaitadvaita (Dvaitādvaita) Darshan, also known as the Bhedabhed Darshan, which resembles Ramanuja's philosophy. Nimbarka authored a commentary on the Brahmasutras entitled the Vedanta Parijatasaurabha (Vedānta Pārijātasaurabha). Within this darshan, there are three metaphysical entities: jiva (chit), the world (achit), and Brahman. Krishna (Kṛṣna) is worshipped as Brahman and Radha (Rādhā) is the principal devotee. The means of liberation is bhakti.

In the 13th or 14th century, Madhva (Madhva) established a philosophy called the Dvaita (Dvaita) Darshan. Dvaita, which means dualism, refers to two types of metaphysical entities: svatantra (svatantra, independent) and partantra (paratantra, dependent). Brahman, specifically Vishnu (Viṣṇu), is independent while the others (jiva, prakriti, and the world) are dependent. Madhva authored four commentaries on the Brahmasutras, two commentaries on the Bhagavad Gita, and ten commentaries on the Upanishads. Bhakti based on the knowledge of the philosophy is the pathway for liberation, according to him. This darshan, like others which precede it, refutes and criticizes Shankara's Advaita philosophy.

Vallabha’s philosophy, the Shuddhadvaita (Śuddhādvaita) Darshan, or pure non-dualism, was established around the 15th or 16th century. He wrote a commentary on the Brahmasutras, titled the Anubhashya (Aṇubhāṣya), and the Bhagavata Purana (Bhāgavata Purāṇa), titled the Subodhini (Subodhinī). Vallabha, like Shankara, posited the existence of a single entity, Brahman, yet he maintained that the world and the selves are real in being parts of Brahman. Vallabha defines maya as a power of Brahman. Liberation is attained, according to him, by practicing the nine-fold bhakti of Krishna.

== Swaminarayan commentarial tradition ==
=== Swaminarayan ===
Swaminarayan was born 3 April 1781 in the village of Chhapaiya in present-day Uttar Pradesh, India. He completed his study of Hindu texts at a young age. His early study allowed him to engage in scholastic debate at Varanasi at the age of 10. At the age of 11, he renounced his home and traveled for 7 years as a brahmachari (brahmacāri, child yogi) before settling in the hermitage of Ramanand Swami in present-day Gujarat. On 28 October 1800, Ramanand initiated him as Sahajanand Swami and in 1801 appointed him to be his successor and leader of the Swaminarayan Sampradaya (sampradāya, fellowship). After Ramanand Swami's death, on 17 December 1801, Sahajanand Swami directed his devotees to chant the Swaminarayan mantra. As devotees began chanting the new mantra, society identified the group by the mantra and began referring to the sampradaya as the Swaminarayan Sampradaya and Sahajanand Swami as Swaminarayan. Textual sources indicate that as early as 1804 Swaminarayan was regarded as the manifestation of God, and over his life, he would be worshiped as God by his followers. Swaminarayan died on 1 June 1830, but the Swaminarayan Sampradaya continued to grow, with an estimated 5 million followers in 2001.

=== Swaminarayan and the Vedanta canon ===
Swaminarayan's teachings are found in the Vachanamrut (Vacanāmṛta), the principal theological text of the Swaminarayan Sampradaya. As followers believe Swaminarayan to be Parabrahman (Parabrahman), his teachings are considered a direct revelation of God. Though Swaminarayan did not author a commentary himself, he discusses and interprets Vedanta texts in his teachings wherein he establishes his own philosophy.

While Swaminarayan states a greater affinity for Ramanuja's philosophy compared to the philosophy of Shankara, in the Vachanamrut and other Swaminarayan texts, he delineates his own unique philosophy by presenting five eternal entities versus Ramanuja's three. In the Vachanamrut, Swaminarayan states, “from the Vedas, Purans, the itihas and the Smrutis, I have formed the principle that jiva, ishvar, maya, Brahma, and Parabrahma are all eternal.”

=== Historical Sanskrit commentarial literature in the Swaminarayan Sampradaya ===
In the 19th and 20th centuries, various figures within the Swaminarayan Sampradaya took on the task of composing and publishing Vedanta commentarial texts. With respect to commentaries on the Brahmasutras, handwritten manuscripts date to the early 19th century, while printed commentaries began to appear in the early 20th century. Though these commentaries are attributed to senior monastic disciples of Swaminarayan, Muktanand Swami and Gopalanand Swami, their actual authorship is disputed on account of the existence of two completely different sets of texts written in their name.

One set of commentaries includes the Brahmasutra Bhashya Ratnam (Brahmasūtrabhāṣyaratnam) attributed to Muktanand Swami and the Vyasa Sutrartha Dipa (Vyāsasūtrārthadīpa) attributed to Gopalanand Swami. The second text explicitly references the first.

In 1952, the Vadtal diocese's Sanskrit Pathashala published two Brahmasutra commentaries, the Brahma Mimamsa (Brahmamīmāṃsā) and a sub-commentary to the Brahma Mimamsa titled Pradipa (Pradīpa). The two commentaries appeared in one volume with prefaces written by Krishnamacharya and Annangaracharya, two Srivaisnava scholars hired from Tamil Nadu by the Pathashala. Annangaracharya is credited as the editor of the entire volume. Though the Brahma Mimamsa commentary is attributed to Muktanand Swami and Pradipa is attributed to Gopalanand Swami, these texts bear no resemblance to the other texts. While historically there are instances of the same commentator authoring multiple commentaries on a sacred text, the lack of similarity between the two sets of Brahmasutra commentaries calls this authorship into question.

A comparative study of these Sanskrit commentaries reveals that while the Brahma Sutra Bhashya Ratnam does make reference to some unique features of Swaminarayan's Vedanta as described in the Vachanamrut, it ultimately bears more affinity with Vishishtadvaita Vedanta. The Brahma Mimamsa is even more aligned with Vishishtadvaita Vedanta rather than the Vedanta principles taught by Swaminarayan in his discourses in the Vachanamrut.

== Creation of the Swaminarayan Bhashyam ==
=== Bhadreshdas Swami ===
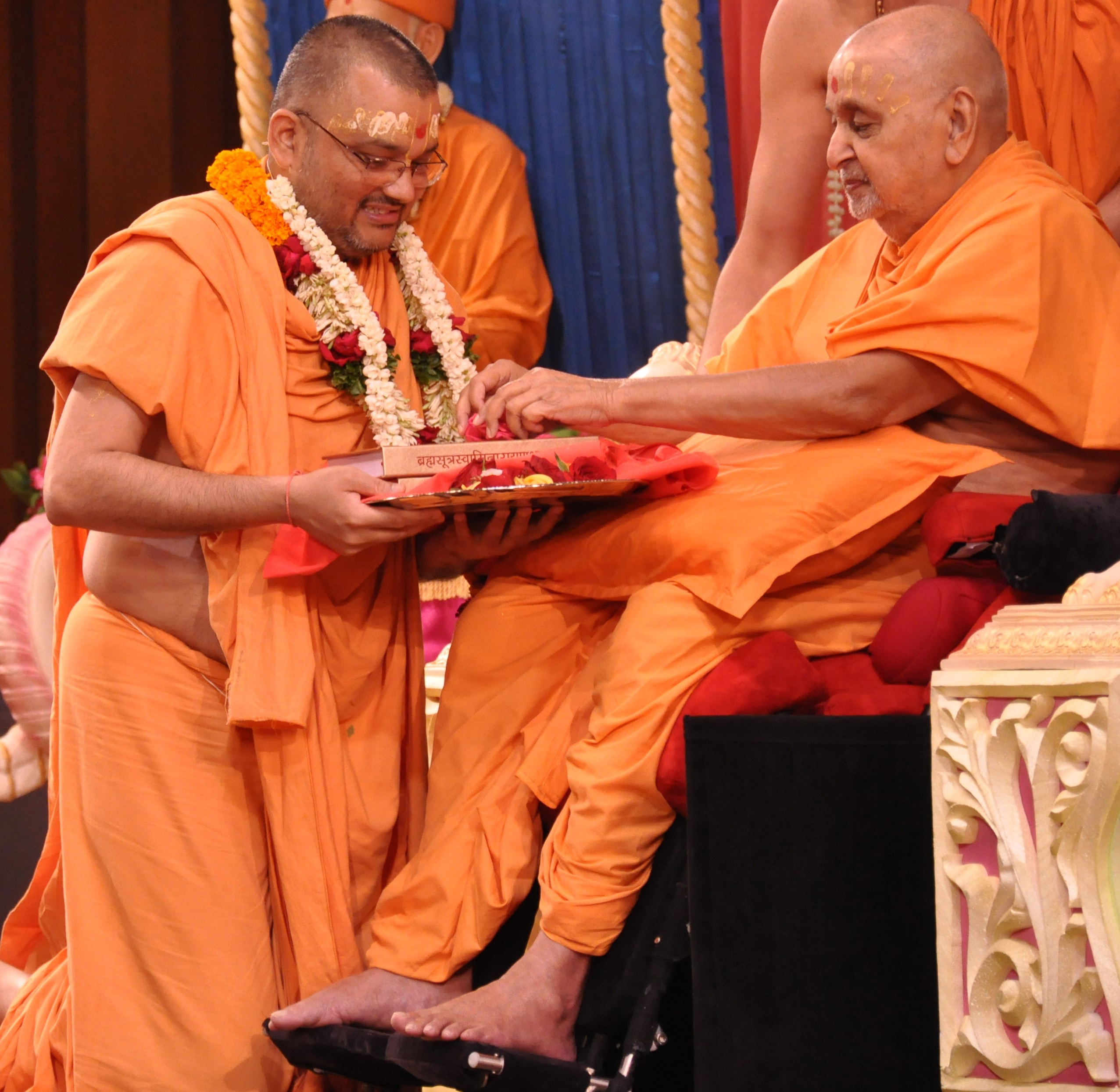
Bhadreshdas Swami presenting the Swaminarayan Bhashyam to Pramukh Swami Maharaj, 17 December 2007, Ahmedabad, India

The author of the Swaminarayan Bhashyam, Bhadreshdas Swami, is a swami of the BAPS Swaminarayan Sampradaya and an eminent scholar of the Swaminarayan Hindu tradition. He was initiated as a swami by Pramukh Swami Maharaj in 1981. As Shaddarshan Acharya (Śaḍdarśanācārya) he holds the equivalent of a master's degree in each of the six classical schools of Hindu philosophy: Sankhya (Sāṅkhya), Yoga (Yoga), Nyaya (Nyāya), Vaisheshika (Vaiśeṣika), Mimamsa (Mīmāṃsā), and Vedanta (Vedānta), a Master's in neo-classical Indian logic (Navya Nyaya Acharya, Navyanyāyācārya), and a Master's in Sanskrit grammar (Vyakarana Acharya, Vyākaraṇācārya). In 2005 he received a Ph.D. in Sanskrit for his comparative work on the Vachanamrut and Bhagavad Gita (Paramatma Pratyaksha Swarupa Yoga, Paramātmapratyakṣasvarūpayogaḥ) from Karnataka University in 2005. In 2010, for the Swaminarayan Bhashyam, he was awarded a D.Litt. in Vedanta from Kavikulaguru Kalidas Sanskrit University and the honorific title Mahamahopadhyaya (Mahāmadopādhyāya) in 2012. In 2013 he received the Darshankesari (Darśanakesarī) award from the Akhil Bhartiya Vidvat Parishad, Varanasi and in 2015 ‘Vedanta-Martanda’ (Vedānta-Mārtaṇḍa) from Silpakorn University, Bangkok at the 16th World Sanskrit Conference. He currently serves as the head scholar at the Yagnapurush Sanskrit Pathshala in Sarangpur where he teaches Indian philosophy, Sanskrit, and Indian classical music.

Bhadreshdas Swami has also authored the Sanskrit text, Swaminarayan Siddhant Sudha (Svāminārāyaṇa-Siddhānta-Sudhā), a vad grantha (vādgrantha) which offers systematic exposition of and justification for the philosophical principles found in the Swaminarayan Bhashyam.

=== Inspiration ===
In 2005, upon the completion of his Ph.D., Bhadreshdas Swami was instructed by Pramukh Swami Maharaj, 5th spiritual successor of Swaminarayan in the BAPS Swaminarayan Sanstha, to author Sanskrit commentaries on the Prasthanatrayi.

Bhadreshdas Swami was authoring the commentaries in a room in the basement of the BAPS Swaminarayan Mandir in Sarangpur when, in 2007, a flash flood inundated his room destroying his books, notes, and writing. Pramukh Swami Maharaj was informed of the tragedy, and he inspired Bhadreshdas Swami to continue writing and finish the commentaries by the time of the BAPS Centenary Celebration in December 2007, approximately 6 months from the time of the flood. Bhadreshdas Swami was able to complete the task and presented the bhashyas to Pramukh Swami Maharaj on 17 December 2007 in Ahmedabad.

=== Why it is titled Swaminarayan Bhashyam ===
Biographies indicate Swaminarayan studied and attained mastery in Hindu texts at a young age. In his teachings recorded in the Vachanamrut and other texts, Swaminarayan discussed Vedanta texts (such as the Upanishads and Bhagavad Gita) and established a set of philosophical principles of Vedanta distinct to those of Ramanuja, Shankara, and previous commentators. However, he did not author any Sanskrit commentaries himself. When compared to the various schools of Vedanta, Swaminarayan's teachings were unique. However the commentaries produced in the 19th and 20th centuries that were attributed to his disciples—some of which were likely authored by Srivaisnava scholars—did not articulate Swaminarayan's distinct philosophy, instead relying heavily on Ramanuja's and Shankara's systems. A commentary on the Prasthanatrayi that would highlight the distinguishing doctrines of Swaminarayan's philosophy was needed. Bhadreshdas Swami's exposition is the first Vedanta commentary that accurately brings forth Swaminarayan's own philosophical identity within the school of Vedanta, hence justifying the attribution of ‘Swaminarayan’ to the title of his commentarial work. Bhadreshdas Swami states the purpose of the title in the introductory verses of the Brahmasutra commentary:

Svāminārāyaṇeha siddhānto yaḥ prakāśitaḥ |
Tasyaiva sarvathā samyagiānusaraṇam yataḥ ||

Yasmācca divyamantro’yaṃ Svāminārāyaṇeti yaḥ |
Bravīti brahmavidyāsthau hyakṣarapuruṣottamau ||
Tasmāddhi saṃjñitaṃ bhāṣyaṃ svāminārāyaṇā’’khyayā |
Prasīdatu sadā sākṣātsvāminārāyaṇo hariḥ ||

“The commentary has been titled Swaminarayan because it is in accordance with the doctrinal principles revealed by Swaminarayan, and the divine mantra ‘Swaminarayan’ denotes Akshar and Purushottam who constitute Brahmavidya. May the manifest Swaminarayan Hari be ever pleased.”

=== Overview of contents ===
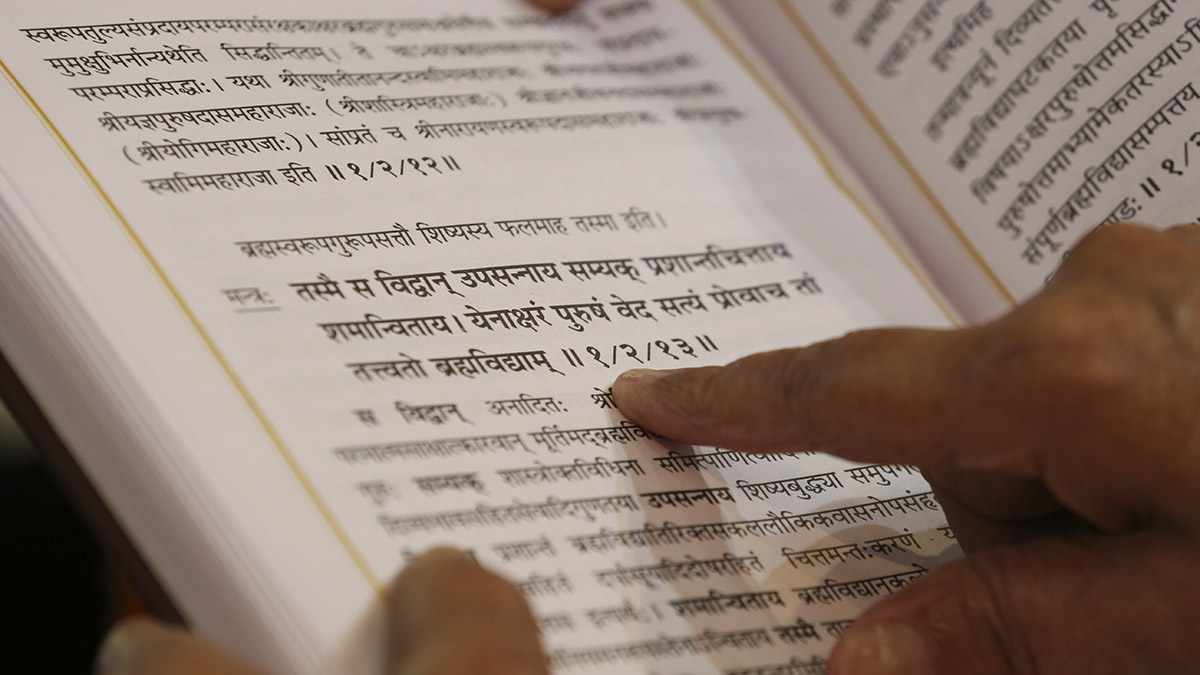
Swaminarayan Bhashyam

Although written in the 21st century, the Swaminarayan Bhashyam is composed in the same style as the Vedanta commentaries which precede it. It expounds and establishes the Akshar-Purushottam Darshan principles according to Swaminarayan's teachings. The five metaphysical eternal entities (jiva, ishvara, maya, Aksharbrahman, and Parabrahman), the ontological distinction of Brahman and Parabrahman, an exposition of what constitutes spiritual knowledge (brahmavidya), and the means to liberation through identifying with Brahman and exclusive devotion to Parabrahman are extensively established through the commentary, using classical hermeneutical moves. This comprehensive commentary on the Prasthanatrayi spans 5 volumes and over 2,000 pages:

1. Ishadyashtopanishat Swaminarayan Bhashyam (Īśādyaṣṭopaniṣat-Svāminārāyaṇa-Bhāṣyam) (476 pages) contains the commentary on 8 of the 10 principal Upanishads:
  1. Isha (Īśā) Upanishad
  2. Kena (Kena) Upanishad
  3. Katha (Kaṭha) Upanishad
  4. Prashna (Praśna) Upanishad
  5. Mundaka (Muṇḍaka) Upanishad
  6. Mandukya (Māṇḍūkya) Upanishad
  7. Taittiriya (Taittirīya) Upanishad
  8. Aitareya (Aitareya) Upanishad
2. Chandogya Upanishad Swaminarayana Bhasyam (Chāndogyopaniṣat-Svāminārāyaṇa-Bhāṣyam) (419 pages)
3. Brihadaranyaka Upanishad Swaminarayan Bhashyam (Bṛhadāraṇyakopaniṣat-Svāminārāyaṇa-Bhāṣyam) (389 pages)
4. Shrimad Bhagavad Gita Swaminarayan Bhashyam (Śrīmad-Bhagavad-Gītā-Svāminārāyaṇa-Bhāṣyam) (404 pages)
5. Brahmasutra Swaminarayan Bhashyam (Brahmasūtra-Svāminārāyaṇa-Bhāṣyam) (462 pages)

== Philosophical exposition - Akshar-Purushottam Darshan ==
=== Metaphysical eternal entities ===
The philosophy taught by Swaminarayan and expounded upon in the Swaminarayan Bhashyam is known as the Akshar-Purushottam Darshan (Akṣara-Puruṣottama Darśana). Unlike the previous darshans, the Akshar-Purushottam Darshan posits the existence of five eternally distinct entities: jiva (jīva, the soul or ‘atman’), ishvara (īśvara, the soul with greater power than the jiva), maya (māyā, Parabrahman's divine creative energy, insentient entity), Aksharbrahman (Akṣarabrahman, or Akshar, which transcends all except Parabrahman), and Parabrahman (Parabrahman, the highest eternal entity, God). The Akshar-Purushottam Darshan's most distinctive feature is its identification of two Brahmans: Aksharbrahman and Parabrahman. All other commentators have only identified one Brahman.

Summary of Darshans and metaphysical entities
Exponent	Name of Darshan	Metaphysical Entities
Shankara	Advaita	Brahman
Ramanuja	Vishishtadvaita	Chit, Achit, and Brahman
Nimbarka	Dvaitadvaita	Chit, Achit, and Brahman
Madhva	Dvaita	Svatantra and Paratantra
Vallabha	Shuddhadvaita	Chit, Achit, and Brahman
Chaitanya Mahaprabhu	Achintyabhedabheda	Chit, Achit, and Brahman
Swaminarayan	Akshar-Purushottam	Jiva, Ishvar, Maya, Brahman, and Parabrahman

Parabrahman (or Purushottam, Paramatma, Parameshwar, God) is the highest of the five entities. Four qualities are attributed to Parabrahman:

1. Sarvopari (sarvopari, supreme) - Parabrahman transcends and is infinitely greater than all entities.
2. Karta (kartā, all-doer) - Parabrahman is the omniagent and the cause of all causes.
3. Sakar (sākār, possessing a divine form) - Parabrahman eternally possesses a divine form, shaped like a human and devoid of any mayik (māyik) material.
4. Pragat (pragat, manifest) - Parabrahman manifests in the world in a human-form and, after returning to his abode, remains manifest through the human form of Aksharbrahman.

Aksharbrahman (or Akshar, Brahman) is the second highest metaphysical entity. Similar to Parabrahman, Aksharbrahman is eternally above the influences of maya. Aksharbrahman is one entity but manifests as four different forms:

1. Akshardham (Akṣardhāma) - the eternal abode of Parabrahman
2. The ideal devotee of Purushottam within Akshardham
3. The Brahmaswarup Guru (Brahmasvarūpa Gūrū) in human form on Earth
4. Chidakash (Cidākāśa) - the all-pervading conscious space

Maya is an insentient entity which is the substance from which the material world is created. Maya also constitutes the ignorance which causes the jivas’ and ishvaras’ entrapment in the cycle of rebirth. Parabrahman and Aksharbrahman are always free from the bondage of maya. A jiva or ishvara must associate with the Aksharbrahman (Brahmaswarup) Guru in order to transcend maya and attain liberation.

Ishvara, not to be confused with Parabrahman, is an entity higher than jiva yet still bound by maya. Ishvaras have elevated abilities which they use to fulfill various functions within the universes.

Jiva (also called atman, ātman, or jīvātman) is the individual soul within every being. The jiva is bound by maya resulting in repeated births and deaths. Birth is defined as the jiva acquiring a new body, and death departing from its body. Once the jiva associates with the Aksharbrahman Guru, the jiva transcends maya and attains liberation.

=== Aksharbrahman as ontologically distinct ===
When commenting on the first chapter of the Mundaka Upanishad that explicates paravidya (parāvidyā), a synonym of brahmavidya (brahmavidyā or brahmajnāna), Shankara and Ramanuja assert that the qualities ascribed to Akshar therein such as omnipresent, immutable, and the source of all beings, can only be attributed to the Supreme Being, and so they define Akshar as being synonymous with the Supreme Being. Thus, when they come to Mundaka Upanishad 1.1.6, which defines paravidya as that by which Akshar is known (“atha parā yayā akṣaram adhigamyate”), they conclude that the term Akshar cannot but refer to the Supreme Being. Yet, in the following chapter of the Mundaka Upanishad, commenting on verse 2.1.2, they construe Akshar differently. As the verse states explicitly that the Supreme Being is higher than Akshar (“akṣarāt parataḥ paraḥ”), they take the term Akshar as referring not to the Supreme Being but non-sentient prakriti. Ramanuja adds to this another interpretation when glossing Akshar in the Bhagavad Gita: there, he interprets Akshar as referring to all of the liberated souls. Both Shankara and Ramanuja thus interpret Akshar variously as brahman, prakriti, and released souls in their commentaries, inevitably breaking semantic consistency, one of the six hermeneutical devices in the Vedanta system.

Bhadreshdas Swami, in the Swaminarayan Bhasyam, indicates that, to maintain consistency, Akshar needs to be taken as an entity ontologically distinct from Purushottam (or Parabrahman). He foregrounds verse 2.1.2 (specifically the phrase “akṣarāt parataḥ paraḥ”) of the Mundaka Upanishad in doing so. Bhadreshdas Swami shows that the phrase “Aksharat paratah parah”, which is translated as “Purushottam is greater than Akshar who is greater than all else,” clues one in to a consistent interpretation of the Mundaka Upanishad and all other texts that refer to Akshar. Although Akshar can be used as an adjective or a noun, he shows that in verse 2.1.2 of the Mundaka Upanishad, “Akshar” is used as a proper noun, and not an adjective, denoting a distinct entity. Interpreted thus, Akshar carries a consistent meaning throughout the commentary. Whereas Shankara and Ramanuja interpret Akshar variously in order to account for, on the one hand, Akshar's being described as eternal, omnipresent, and the source of all beings in the first chapter of the Mundaka Upanishad and as being lower than the Supreme being in verse 2.1.2, on the other, Bhadresh Swami maintains consistency by showing that both verses refer to the same entity, Akshar: that which is ontologically higher (para) than and the cause of all other entities, and thus fit to be ascribed the adjectives used in the first chapter, but ontologically subordinate to Parabrahman, which verse 2.1.2 reveals. Bhadreshdas Swami draws this interpretation from the teachings of Swaminarayan in the Vachanamrut. Swaminarayan describes Akshar by saying “Purushottam (Parabrahman) is greater than even Akshar who is greater than all else” and “Parabrahman, that is Purushottam Narayana, is distinct from Brahman, and is also the cause, support, and inspirer of Brahman.” Swaminarayan's definition of Akshar corresponds almost exactly with the definition provided in the Mundaka Upanishad Verse 2.1.2, an entity distinct from Parabrahman and higher than all other entities except Parabrahman.

Comparing interpretations of Mundaka Upanishad verse 2.1.2: “Akṣarāt parataḥ paraḥ”
	Shankara	Ramanuja	Swaminarayan
Sanskrit	अव्याकृताद्	भूतसूक्ष्मम् अचेतनम्	पूर्वं परविद्याधिगम्यतयोक्तादक्षराख्यदिव्यतत्त्वाद
Transliteration	Avyākṛtād	Bhūtasūkṣmam acetanam	Pūrvaṃ paravidyādhigamyata - yoktādakṣarākhyadivyatattvād
Translation	“Undivided substance” (distinct from the Akshara mentioned in previous mantras	“Insentient subtle elements” (distinct from the Akshara mentioned in previous mantras)	“Aksharbrahman, a divine, conscious being” (the same Akshara as mentioned in previous mantras)

The eighth chapter of the Bhagavad Gita is titled Aksharbrahma Yoga (Akṣarabrahmayoga) because it focuses on Aksharbrahman. In the chapter, Arjuna asks Krishna, “What is Brahman?” Krishna answers his question in verse 8.3, stating “Aksharam brahma paramam” (Akṣaraṃ brahma paramaṃ). In this verse ‘parama’ means the ‘highest’ or ‘greatest.’ ‘Akshar’ is then described, in verse 8.21, as “the highest abode,” and, in verse 8.38, as the “highest place.” Swaminarayan asserts that Akshar is the highest abode of God in several discourses within the Vachanamrut. For instance, he statesin one discourse: “Akshar is the abode of Purushottam Bhagawan” (Vachanamrut Gadhada 1.63). Bhadreshdas Swami shows that the interpretation of Akshar as being synonymous with Brahman and the highest abode of Parabrahman (who is higher than Brahman) remains consistent throughout the Bhagavad Gita.

In verses 16 through 18 of Chapter 15, also known as the Purushottam Yoga (Puruṣottamayoga), three types of beings are discussed: kshar (kṣar, all beings on earth), akshar (akṣara, an immutable being), and uttam purush (uttama puruṣa, God, Parabrahman, who supports the world and is higher than kshar and akshar). Swaminarayan similarly defines three types of individuals in his teachings. He describes Parabrahman as transcending both kshar and Akshar, where jiva and ishvaras are kshar, and Akshar is a singular entity higher than them. Commenting on verses 15.16-18, Bhadreshdas Swami shows that the Bhagavad Gita shows Parabrahman to be distinct from Aksharbrahman and that to ensure consistency throughout the Bhagavad Gita, ‘Akshar’ (or Aksharbrahman) needs to be understood as a distinct entity.

=== Exposition of Brahmavidya ===
Brahmavidya, the knowledge of Brahman (or brahmajnana, brahmajñāna), and its role in liberation is a central focus in Vedanta philosophy. Bhadreshdas Swami states in the preface of each volume of the Swaminarayan Bhashyam that the main topic of the commentary is brahmavidya and that only through brahmavidya can one be liberated from the cycle of rebirth. He interprets the knowledge of Brahman to mean the knowledge of Parabrahman and Aksharabrahman. In substantiating this interpretation, Bhadreshdas Swami elaborates on the grammatical construct of ‘Brahma’ in Brahmasutra verse 1.1.1, “Atha’to brahmajignasa” (“Next, therefore, the desire to know Brahman”; athā’to brahmajijñāsā). “Jignasa” means a desire to know, so brahmajignasa means the desire to know ‘Brahman.’ “Brahman” in this verse is taken to refer to Aksharabrahman and Parabrahman. Bhadreshdas Swami shows that Brahman in ‘brahmajignasa’ is a copulative compound (dvanda samāsa), called ekashesa (ekaśesa), which allows the combination of two or more related words. The resulting compound is the final constitutive member's dual or plural form. When ‘Aksharbrahman’ and ‘Parabrahman’ are combined in this method, ‘brahmani’ (brahmaṇī) is the resulting dual form and applying the genitive case it becomes ‘brahmanoh’ (brahmaṇoḥ). When brahmanoh conjoins with jignasa to form a compound, it loses its case ending and the result is brahmajignasa, the desire to know Aksharbrahman and Parabrahman. This particular interpretation holds true throughout the Brahmasutra, Upanishad, and Bhagavad Gita.

Brahmavidya is introduced in the first verse of the first chapter in the Mundaka Upanishad.8 In the verses following, two types of knowledge are defined: lower (aparā) and higher (parā). Lower knowledge refers to the study of the Vedas, phonetics, grammar, astronomy, and ritual science and higher knowledge, synonymous with brahmavidya, refers to that by which Akshar can be known. Mundaka Upanishad 1.2.12 states that to realize brahmavidya, one must surrender to only that guru who has the realization of revealed text, who is (Akshar) Brahman, and who is ever steadfast in Parabrahman. Commenting on these verses, Bhadreshdas Swami asserts that surrendering to the guru means one must foster a relationship of service, obedience and dedication. Similarly, Swaminarayan states in the Vachanamrut (Kariyani 12) that the only means of liberation for the jiva is through associating with the Aksharbrahman Guru.

In the Bruhadaranyaka Upanishad, Yagnavalkya explains to Gargi the implications of including and excluding Aksharbrahman from one's brahmavidya. Yagnavalakya says that whosoever without knowing Akshar worships, makes offering or performs austerities for thousands of years, the fruit of those endeavors are impermanent and they deserve pity for leaving this world without knowing Akshar. Alternatively, one who leaves this world having known Akshar is brahmana (brāhmaṇa), a perfect knower of Brahman. For a devotee, Aksharbrahman is thus understood to be pivotal and indispensable in gaining full knowledge of Parabrahman and reaching the highest spiritual state.

The central theme in the Akshar Purushottam Darshan, reiterated by Swaminarayan, is the need to associate with Aksharbrahman, and, having cultivated the qualities of Aksharbrahman, offer devotion to Parabrahman.

== Reception and recognition ==
Since its creation, there has been widespread recognition by Sanskrit scholars of the Swaminarayan Bhashyam as an authoritative commentary on the Prasthanatrayi, Bhadreshdas Swami as an acharya in the lineage of Shankara, Ramanuja, etc., and the Akshar-Purushottam Darshan as a distinct school of Vedanta.

=== Shri Kashi Vidvat Parishad ===
The Shri Kashi Vidvat Parishad (Śrī Kāśī Vidvat Pariṣad) is a council of specialists recognized throughout India for their expertise in Vedic literature. Members of the council hold exceptional scholarly status in Vedas, Vedanta, smruti (smṛti) texts, nyaya (nyāya), and vyakarana (vyākaraṇa). On 31 July 2017, after scholarly deliberations the council stated that it is "appropriate to identify Sri Svāminārāyaṇa’s Vedānta by the title: Akṣarapuruṣottama Darśana," and that his siddhanta ("view," "doctrine") is "distinct from Advaita, Viśiṣṭādvaita, and all other doctrines." The council also recognized Bhadreshdas Swami as an acharya in line with Shankara, Ramanuja, Madhva, and Vallabha, and as the only Sanskrit scholar in history to write both a commentary on the Prasthanatrayi and a vadagrantha. Mahamahopadyaya Pandit Shivji Upadhyay announced the following declaration:

- The Prasthānatrayī-Svāminārāyaṇabhāṣya and the Svāminārāyaṇasiddhāntasudhā are sacred texts on Parabrahman Svāminārāyaṇa's revealed Akṣarapuruṣottama Darśana. These sacred texts are in every manner the protectors of the eternal Vedic religious tradition.
- Acclaimed by all scholars, respected Mahāmahopādyāya Sadhu Bhadreshdas is an ācārya and a contemporary commentator in the lineage of commentators on the Prasthānatrayī.
- Within philosophy, just as Śrī Śaṅkara's Vedānta is identified as the Advaita Darśana, Śrī Rāmānuja's Vedānta is identified as the Viśiṣṭādvaita Darśana, Śrī Madhva's Vedānta is identified as the Dvaita Darśana, Śrī Vallabha's Vedānta is identified as the Śuddhādvaita Darśana, and others are respectively known; it is in every way appropriate to identify Sri Svāminārāyaṇa's Vedānta by the title: Akṣarapuruṣottama Darśana.
- Therefore, we all collectively endorse that this Akṣarapuruṣottama Siddhānta that has been revealed by Parabrahman Svāminārāyaṇa is distinct from Advaita, Viśiṣṭādvaita, and all other doctrines and is a Vedic siddhānta.

=== 17th World Sanskrit Conference ===
In 2018, at the 17th World Sanskrit Conference in Vancouver, Canada, Bhadreshdas Swami presented the principles of the Akshar-Purushottam Darshan at the conference's inaugural plenary session, and professor Ashok Aklujkar agreed with recognition of the Akshar-Purushottam distinction as a separate siddhanta within Vedanta.

Professor Deven Patel of the University of Pennsylvania said,

“The World Sanskrit Conference is proud to honor this new and truly historic achievement in the world of Sanskrit philosophical culture. It is the first Sanskrit commentary on the Upanishads, the Brahma Sutras, and the Bhagavad Gita in nearly 200 years and the first commentary on the complete set by a single acharya in over 1200 years. This five-volume commentary, known as the Swaminarayan-Bhashyam, interprets the Prasthanatrayi through the lens of Bhagwan Swaminarayan’s Akshar-Purushottam Darshan. We are fortunate to have present before us today, in Bhadreshdas Swami, the acharya who, in the tradition of Shankara, Ramanuja, Madhva, Nimbarka, Vallabha, and others, has composed these commentaries.”

Professor George Cardona explained Bhadreshdas Swami's work by saying, “This is a very important classical Sanskrit commentary that very clearly and effectively explains that Akshar is distinct from Purushottam.”

Conference committee member and Sanskrit scholar from the University of British Columbia, Professor Ashok Aklujkar said, “[Bhadreshdas Swami’s] commentaries on the Prasthanatrayi are a truly great achievement. I think all of us at the World Sanskrit Conference are fortunate to have a bhashyakar in our midst. Just as the Kashi Vidvat Parishad acknowledged Swaminarayan Bhagwan’s Akshar-Purushottam Darshan as a distinct darshan in the Vedanta tradition, we are honored to do the same from the platform of the World Sanskrit Conference.”

=== Reviews by scholars ===
Renowned scholar in Navya-Nyaya and Ramanuja Vedanta, Mahamahopadhyaya Professor N.S. Ramanuja Tatacharya, highlighted the innovative contribution of Bhadreshdas Swami's commentarial work to Sanskrit literature and Vedanta. In his review, he acknowledged the distinguishing features of the Akshar Purushottam Darshan to that of the Advaita school of thought. He states that despite the overlap between Shankara, Ramanuja, Madhva and other classical acharyas, “there are many principles – including those on the number of fundamental entities, their form and nature, the description of soteriology, and the means for attaining liberation that distinguish them from one another.” He acknowledged Bhadreshdas Swami's proficiency in grammar and writing to be comparable to that of Shankara and other classical commentators stating “it is free from grammatical inconsistency, embellished with well-reasoned argumentation, amiable, with profound meaning and depth, pleasant to hear, and untainted by enmity.”

Mahamahopadhyaya Professor R. Krishnamurti Shastri stated, “The Svāminārāyaṇabhāṣya on the Brahmasūtras authored by the renowned Bhadreshdas Swami is lucid...it precisely reveals Svāminārāyaṇa’s sentiments and teachings, which are distinct from the [Advaita, Vishishtadvaita, and Dvaita] doctrines.” He highlighted Bhadreshdas Swami's ability to summarize the philosophical principles and his captivating writing style.

Professor V.S. Vishnu Potty (Professor and Dean at the School of Sanskrit & Languages, Kanchipuram), acknowledged the objective novel interpretation presented in the Brahmasutra Swaminarayan Bhashyam. He states that one can easily attempt to elevate their own interpretation by criticizing other's beliefs, yet the Swaminarayan Bhashyam is void of such judgement.

Professor Madan Mohan Agrawal, Professor Emeritus of Sanskrit from Delhi University, congratulated Bhadreshdas Swami for the successful completion of the commentaries on the Prasthanatrayi which advanced Vedanta philosophy to include the Akshar-Purushottam philosophy. He noted that a vast number of topics are covered in the Brahmasutra Swaminarayan Bhashyam but done so concisely and flawlessly.

Professor Radhakrishna Bhatt, former Head of Sanskrit Research and Publication at Karnataka State Open University, stated that the bhasyam is created in accordance with Vedic principles and establishes Swaminarayan's philosophy, and this is a great service for the human kind. He hoped for future Sanskrit scholarly work to emerge from the Swaminarayan Bhashyam.
