= Devanand Swami =

Devanand Swami (1803–1854) was an Indian swami.

== Childhood ==
He was born in 1803 (Samvat year 1859 on Kartik Poornima) in the village of Balol Bhal, India. Devanand Swami's childhood name was Devidan, his mother's name was Bahenjiba, and his father's name was Jijibhai.

Devidan once held his father's hand and they went to a Shiva temple. The child was very religious and wanted to please Lord Shiva. A legend says that he spilled some water and milk on the idol. He felt very happy after doing this. Then, Lord Shiva presented a boon to him in that he would meet the supreme lord in person, he would come to his village. Devidan was extremely happy.

== Becoming a saint ==
Devidan once ran into Shri Swaminarayan, who was believed to be the lord. Lord Shiva's boon came true. After seeing Lord Swaminarayan do unusual things that the ordinary can't do, he was convinced that Lord Swaminarayan surely was the supreme lord. Lord Swaminarayan initiated him into the sadhu fold (becoming a saint). He was then renamed Devanand Swami. Devanand Swami's singing was said to be great- he composed few, but he had astounding kirtans (religious songs). Devanand Swami was also popular for his great talent with the sitar (an instrument popular in India). Devanand Swami taught his great talent to many people, such as Dalpatram. After Sadguru Brahmanand Swami died, he was in charge of the temple at Muli. Finally, in 1854 (Samvat 1910) Devanand Swami died.
