= Swaminarayan Jayanti =

Hindu religious celebration

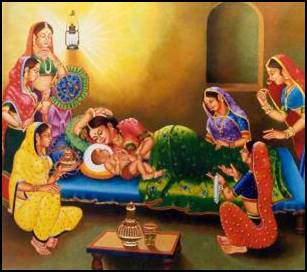
Swaminarayan at birth, with his mother Premvati

Swaminarayan was born on 3 April 1781 (Chaitra sud Nom in the Vikram Samvat calendar) in Chhapaiya. This day is annually celebrated as Shree Swaminarayan Jayanti by his followers. This coincides with the occasion of Ram Navmi.

== Overview ==
The day is spent in worship and reflection by followers who observe a waterless fast. In the evening, celebrations include scriptural discourses, Swaminarayan Mantra chanting, devotional singing, and live enactments of episodes from the life of Swaminarayan. Swaminarayan was born at 10:10 PM, and to mark the occasion, a divine murti of Shree Swaminarayan bhagwan is placed in a small swing and a special Aarti is performed at all Shri Swaminarayan Mandirs at this same time.
