= Jay Sadguru Swami =

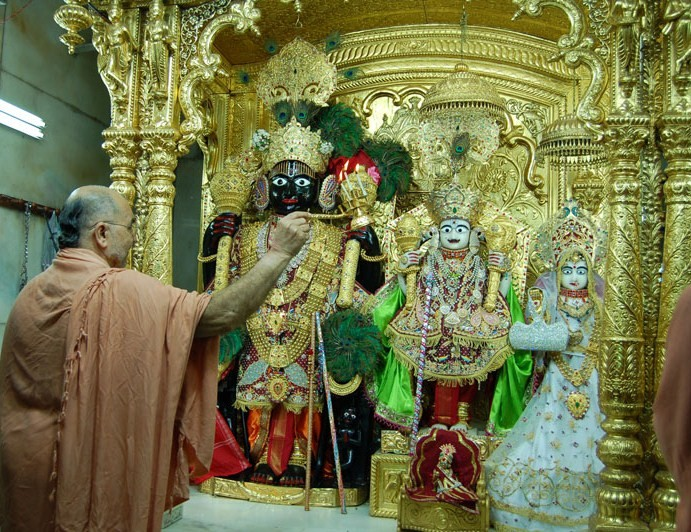
Arti ritual being conducted at the Swaminarayan mandir, Vadtal, to Shree Ranchhodray-Laxminarayan Dev by an ascetic

Jay Sadguru Swami is the arti sung at Swaminarayan Sampradaya mandirs. This arti was composed by Muktanand Swami on 5 November 1802. During the arti, a lighted lamp is waved before murtis, representations of Swaminarayan and other deities. In shikharbaddha mandirs, arti is performed five times a day; in dev mandirs, also known as Hari mandirs, arti is performed in the morning and evening only.

== See also ==
- Swaminarayan
- Swaminarayan Sampradaya
