= Nishkulanand Swami =

Nishkulanand Swami (1766–1848) was a paramhansa and swami of the Swaminarayan Sampradaya.

== Biography ==
Nishkulanand Swami was born on 16 January 1766 to a Suthar family residing in a small village called Shekhpat, near Jamnagar, in present-day Gujarat, India. His parents were Rambhai and Amritbai, and he was named Lalji at birth. He grew up to be an expert at carpentry.

He became a follower of Swaminarayan after the passing of his Guru-preceptor Ramanand Swami.

It is said that when Swaminarayan wished to leave this world, he informed Nishkulanand Swami three days in advance and asked to prepare a palanquin for his bier. Nishkulanand Swami prepared it during night only. When he left the human body, all the other saints asked him to prepare a palanquin. He said, "It is ready" and brought it. Everyone asked him, "When he was alive, how did you prepare it?" He replied, "I am a heavy-hearted obedient servant. Any damn or any hard order may be, I must obey it."

He was a strong renunciant. In Swaminarayan Hinduism, Nishkulanand Swami is regarded as an ideal example of vairagya, or non-attachment to worldly objects. His name implies this "Nishkul" meaning one who is devoid of family (maya). His poetic creations displayed this intense sense of detachment. He died in VS 1904 at the age of 82 while residing in Dholera.

== Works ==
Nishkulanand Swami composed a scripture named Bhaktachintamani, which describes the life of Swaminarayan along with his sermons and his activities. He has also composed twenty two other scriptures on various subjects (Purshottam Prakash, Yamdanda, Dhirajakhyan, Chosathpadi, among others) which are compiled as Nishkulanand Kavya. He continued writing scriptures until his death. He was also a poet and composed many kirtans, or devotional songs, and poems.

The swing with the twelve doors in the Vadtal Temple and the carved wooden doors in the inner temple of the Dholera Temple are a few of his works of art. In Gadhpur he used to display his artistic skills during Diwali celebrations by presenting decorative plants and trees adorned with kindling lights and lighted canopy to cover the seat of Swaminarayan.
