= Nityanand Swami =

Nityanand Swami may refer to:

- Nityanand Swami (Paramhansa) (1754–1850), a Paramhansa saint of the Swaminarayan Sampraday
- Nityanand Swami (politician) (1927–2012), a politician and 1st Chief Minister of Uttaranchal (now Uttarakhand)
