= Muktanand Swami =

Hindu saint (1758–1830)

- portrait of Muktanand Swami

Personal life
- Born: Mukunddas; 1758 Amrapur, Gujarat, India
- Died: 1830 (aged 71–72)
- Notable work(s): Mukund Bavani; Muktanand Kavya

Religious life
- Religion: Hinduism
- Sect: Swaminarayan Sampradaya

Religious career
- Teacher: Swami Ramanand

Muktanand Swami (1758–1830), born Mukunddas, was a swami and paramahansa of Bhagwan Swaminarayana.

== Biography ==
He was born Mukunddas to Anandram and Radhabai in Amrapur village (Dist-Amreli), Gujarat in 1758.

While children of his age group were indulging in sports and games, Mukunddas sat quietly in seclusion with closed eyes. Mukunddas learned Vedas, scriptures and music from two teachers, Jaduram and Hathiram, who were scholars in literature and fine arts.

Muktanand Swami was also regarded as the incarnation of Naradji.

Muktanand Swami was considered the principal disciple of Ramanand Swami. He mastered the eight folded yogic state.

== Swaminarayan and Muktanand Swami ==
In Loj, Shukhanand Swami a fellow swami and devotee residing at the hermitage found a young swami with divine aura bathing by a well near the village. Impressed by the sight of the divine by the young brahmachari to hermitage and introduced him to Muktanand Swami. Muktanand Swami found himself drawn towards the divine presence of the youthful saint and coming forward offered pranams. On a mutual introduction, Muktanand Swami gathered that the visitor was the son of DharmaDev and BhaktiDevi, and had spent seven years in the seclusion of the mountains and forests. His present name was Varniraj (forestdweller) Nilkanth Varni (Swaminarayan). Muktanand Swami asked Nilkanth Varni to stay in Loj until Ramanand Swami returned the following year.

Satsang gives great importance to Muktanand Swami, because the foundation of this great sect was laid by him by closing interactive window between hermitage and neighbour, and separated women from the gents in Satsang Sabha on instance from Nilkanth Varni.

He, though in age was senior to Nilkanth Varni (renamed Sahajanand Swami by Ramanand Swami), but in succession to Ramanand Swami he proposed Sahajanand Swami as the successive preceptor and head of the sect. In 1801, Muktanand Swami accepted Ramanand Swami's appointment of Nilkanth Varni as leader of the spiritual tradition.^{:18, 83} Thus Muktanand Swami lived under the auspices of Sahajanand Swami who always respected him like a Guru.

In the Swaminarayan Sampradaya, he is known as "the mother of Satsang," a title given by Swaminarayan, due to his affection and care for swamis. He chose Muktanand Swami to represent the Swaminarayan Sampradaya at the Gathering of Vadodara, where the latter was victorious.

Currently, Muktanand Swami's lineage continues with the great saint, HDH Sadguru Shastri Shri Ghanshyamprakashdasji Swami - Shree Swaminarayan Mandir Loyadham. The lineage is as follows: 1) Swaminarayan 2) Sadguru Muktanand Swami 3) Sadguru Adharanand Swami 4) Sadguru Haripriyadasji Swami 5) Sadguru Vaikunthcharandasji Swami 6) Sadguru Narayanswarupdasji Swami 7) Sadguru Nandkishordasji Swami and today this illustrious spiritual tradition of one of Swaminarayan's elite saints is being edified by HDH Sadguru Shastri Shri Ghanshyamprakashdasji Swami.

== Works ==
Muktanand Swami is known for his lyrical compositions which conveyed messages about spiritual teachings and morality. Muktanand Swami was also an instrumentalist and vocalist. He was equally at ease in dancing.

Mukund Bavani is a collection of his devotional poetry. The Aarti that is sung in all Shri Swaminarayan Temples, Jay Sadguru Swami was written by Muktanand Swami in praise of Shri Hari or Swaminarayan.

=== Vachanamrut ===
Muktanand Swami, along with Gopalanand Swami, Nityanand Swami, and Shukanand Swami, was a compiler of the Vachanamrut, a scripture comprising Swaminarayan's discourses.^{:202}

=== Muktanand Kavya ===
Many of Muktanand Swami's works have been published in Muktanand Kavya (Muktānand Kāvya), a collection of 21 texts:

- Dharmakhyan (Dharmākhyan)
- Pancharatna (Pancharatna)
- Vivek Chintamani (Vivek Chintāmaṇi)
- Uddhava Gita (Uddhava Gītā)
- Satsang Shiromani (Satsang Śiromaṇi)
- Sati Gita (Satī Gītā)
- Shikshapatri Bhasha (Śikṣāpatrī Bhāṣā)
- Shri Vasudev Avatar Chintamani (Śrī Vāsudeva Avatāra Chintāmaṇi)
- Mukund Bavani (Mukund Bāvanī)
- Dhamvarnachaturi (Dhāmavarṇachāturi)
- Avdhut Gitam (Avdhutgītām)
- Guru Chovisi (Guru Chovisi)
- Krishnaprasad (Kriṣṇaprasād)
- Narayan Charitra (Nārāyaṇ Charitra)
- Narayan Kavach (Nārāyaṇ Kavach)
- Vaikunth Dham Darshan (Vaikuntha Dhām Darśan)
- Shri Bhagavad Gita Bhasha Tika (Śrimadbhagavadgītābhāṣāṭīkā)
- Kapil Gita (Kapil Gītā)
- Gunvibhag (Gunvibhāg)
- Shri Narayan Gita (Śrī Nārāyaṇ Gītā)
- Rukmini Vivah (Rukmiṇī Vivāh)

=== Reception ===
Muktanand Swami's devotional composition, Dhira Dhurandhara, which was routinely sung by Mahatma Gandhi, was published alongside the works of Nishkulanand Swami and other poets in Gandhi's Ashram Bhajanavali, a compilation of prayers. Some of Muktanand Swami's works have been translated by Harindra Dave, a Gujarati writer.

The Bhagavadgomandal, a 20th-century Gujarati-language reference text, states that the vivah (wedding) compositions found in Muktanand Swami's Rukmini Vivah (Rukmiṇī Vivāh) are sung at most wedding celebrations.
