= Brahmanand Swami =

Hindu saint-poet of the Swaminarayan Sampradaya (1772–1832)

Swami Brahmanand
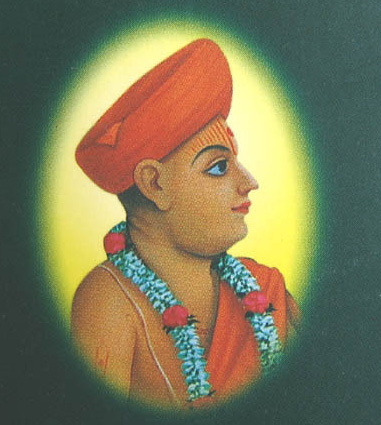
- Born: 12 February 1772; Khan village, Sirohi State (modern-day Rajasthan, India)
- Died: 1832 (aged 59–60)
- Occupation: Saint of the Swaminarayan Sampraday
- Known for: Ashta Kavi (eight poets) within the Swaminarayan Sampraday
- Notable work: 'Brahmanand Kavya' (collection of works)

Brahmanand Swami (12 February 1772 – 1832) was revered as a saint of the Swaminarayan Sampraday and as one of Swaminarayan Bhagwan's Paramahamsa. He was also known as one of Swaminarayan's Ashta Kavi's (eight poets) within the Swaminarayan Sampraday In the scriptures of the Swaminarayan Sampraday it was noted that Brahmanand Swami as stated by Swaminarayan Bhagwan that as the name suggests and implies "Brahmanand" is an Avatar of Brahma.

== Biography ==
Even as a young boy, he showed his talent in the royal court by composing and reciting poems. The Rana of Sirohi, impressed with him, directed that he be taught Dingal (the science of constructing poetry) at the cost of the state. Hence, Ladudanji was well educated and later became a part of King of Udaipur's court. Ladu Dan learnt Dingal and Sanskrit scriptures from Ladhaji Rajput of Dhamadka, becoming a scholar in Dingal, poetry and scriptures. Ladudanji earned fame and wealth by his knowledge and talent of poetry. He was honored in the stately courts of Jaipur, Jodhpur, and others, which were impressed by his poetry.

== Initiation as Sadhu ==
Ladudanji was in Bhuj where he had heard about Swaminarayan Bhagwan and went to meet him. Swaminarayan was addressing a gathering in Bhuj. Ladudanji was attracted to him. Swaminarayan Bhagwan returned to Gadhada with the poet Ladudanji. Ladudanji lived a majestic and royal life as befitting a courtier. He was always clad in the most precious attire, adorned with jewellery fit for royalty. Swaminarayan Bhagwan did not like such a luxurious life style but instead of preaching directly he gradually persuaded Ladudanji who became an ascetic. On the way from Gadhpur to Siddhapur, at a small village named Gerita, Swaminarayan Bhagwan stopped and administered Bhagwati Deeksha (initiation as sadhu) to Ladu Dan by giving sainthood name 'Shrirangdasji'. After some time, he was renamed as Brahmanand Swami.

== Works ==
Like Muktanand Swami, Brahmanand Swami was an excellent poet. His skills and brilliance in temple building is evident in temples like Muli, Vadtal and Junagadh. Besides the construction of great temples in Muli, Vadtal, Junagadh etc., Brahmanand Swami had written scriptures in Hindi and Gujarati. 'Brahmanand Kavya' is the collection of his works, a copy of which is preserved in the British Museum in London.
