= Swaminarayan Mandir, Vadtal =

Shri Swaminarayan Mandir, Vadtal
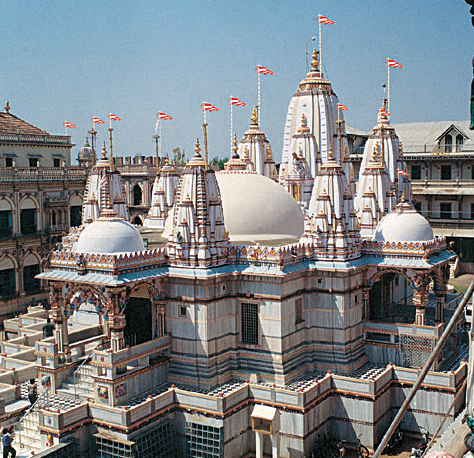
- The headquarters of the Shri Laxminarayan Dev Gaadi

Religion
- Affiliation: Hinduism
- District: Kheda
- Deity: Laxmi Narayan; Radha Krishna
- Festival: Samaiyaa(twice in a year)

Location
- Location: Vadtal
- State: Gujarat
- Country: India
- Interactive map of Shri Swaminarayan Mandir, Vadtal
- Coordinates: 22°35′30″N 72°52′26″E

Architecture
- Architect: Brahmanand Swami
- Creator: Sahajanand Swami
- Completed: 3 November 1824

Website
- vadtalmandir.org

Swaminarayan Mandir, Vadtal (Devanagari: श्री स्वामिनारायण मन्दिर, वडताल) headquarters of the LaxmiNarayan Dev Gadi are located in this temple in Vadtal. There are three main shrines in the temple - the central shrine dedicated to Lakshmi Narayan. The right shrine is dedicated to Radha Krishna and the left shrine has Vasudev, Dharma and Bhakti.

The wooden pillars of the temple bear colourful wood carvings. There is a dharamsala within the temple premises. Gnyanbaug is a garden to the northwest of the temple gate that has four memorials dedicated to Swaminarayan.

== History ==
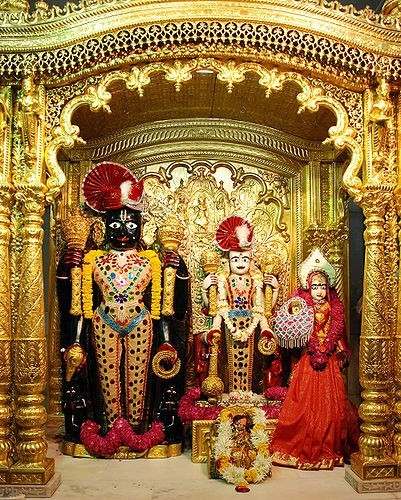
Shree LaxmiNarayan Dev with Ranchhodrai, Embraced & Installed by Swaminarayan himself at this temple

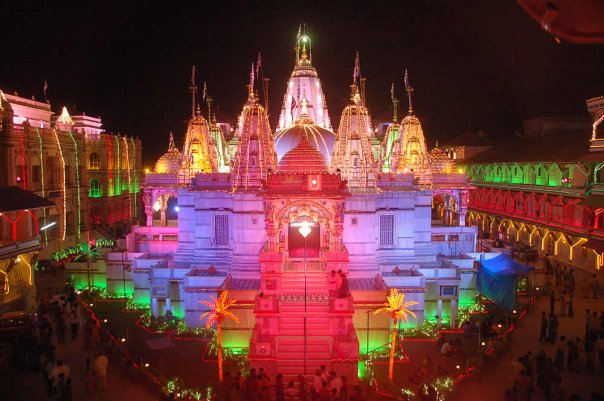
The temple lit up for a festival

The town of Vadtal is also known as Vadtal Swaminarayan. The temple here is in the shape of a lotus, with nine domes in the inner temple. The land for this shrine was donated by Joban Pagi, a devotee of Swaminarayan. The temple was ordered by Swaminarayan and constructed under the supervision of Brahmanand Swami.

Devotees from Vadtal had gone to Shreeji Maharaj on the day of Nirjala Ekadashi to meet him in Gadhada. On the next day - the twelfth day of the bright half of Jyestha - they requested to Swaminarayan to construct a Krishna Mandir in Vadtal. Shreeji Maharaj commanded his disciple S.G Brahmanand Swami to temporarily leave the construction of the Muli temple and proceed with a team of saints to plan and supervise the construction of Vadtal temple. The construction of this temple was completed within 15 months and the idols of Laxminarayan Dev were installed by Swaminarayan himself on 3 November 1824, amidst chants of vedic hymns and devotional fervor of the installation ceremony. In the middle of the temple, he installed the idols of Laxminarayan dev and Ranchhod. To the right, there are the idols of Dharmdev and Bhaktimata and Vasudev. and to the left, Swaminarayan installed the idols of RadhaKrishna and Harikrishna Maharaj.

Besides the Gods sitting in the central temple, in the left wall of the worship-place, were installed the form of Dakshinavart Shankh (Southern-sea conch) and Shaligrama (icon of Vishnu) and in the inner dome, there are the stone-idols of the ten incarnations of god, besides the idols of Vishnu resting on the seat of Sheshnaag (heavenly snake).

== Influence ==
Farmers in and around Vadtal made a fortune by cultivating tobacco. The temple played an important role in influencing these farmers to move to other agricultural options. To benefit pilgrims visiting the temple, a railway terminus was opened in Vadtal in 1929. A 14 mile long broad gauge line was built, connecting it with Kanajari and Boriavi.

During the independence movement, national leaders gave speeches at the temple. In January 1921 Mahatma Gandhi gave a speech at the temple, speaking of the relevance of non-cooperation to Hindu Dharma, "At this holy place, I declare, if you want to protect your 'Hindu Dharma', non-cooperation is first as well as the last lesson you must learn up."

Vallabhbhai Patel (freedom fighter and first Home Minister of India) was influenced by the Swaminarayan philosophy, since he was brought up in a family of Swaminarayan followers. His father used to visit Vadtal in pilgrimage every full moon day and often used to take young Patel with him. It is claimed that since Gandhi's doctrine was similar to that of the reforms teaching of Swaminarayan, Patel was attracted to him.

The Swaminarayan temple in Vadtal is a member of the Vishwa Hindu Parishad (VHP) and is considered to be part of the inner management circle of the organisation. The VHP held its 11th Dharma Sansad (Religious parliament) in Vadtal at the Swaminarayan Temple in 2006.

== Headquarters ==
The temple is the main temple of swaminarayan sampraday and the Acharya and preceptor of the dakshin desh (Laxminarayan Dev Gadi). On the south end of the main temple, there is a place called the Akshar Bhuvan. Its first floor has standing idols of Ghanshyam Maharaj. On the second floor, there is the idol of Ghanshyam Maharaj in sitting posture. Personal objects of Swaminarayan are kept here. On the west there is a place called the Hari Mandap where Swaminarayan wrote the Shikshapatri.

== Town of Vadtal ==
In the east of the town, there is a mango garden where Swaminarayan ignited Holi and played with colours. A canopy has been constructed at this place. On the south side of this place, Swaminarayan had swung on a swing of twelve doors. A marble seat has been constructed at that place. The Gomati lake which was dug by Swaminarayan is in the north of the town. In the middle of the lake is a shelter and a canopy is built on the west of it. Swaminarayan used to sit there at the place of the present canopy when the lake was being excavated. Swaminarayan had preached Vachanamrit under a mango tree next to the lake.
