= Vachanamrut =

Sacred Hindu text composed of 273 discourses by Swaminarayan

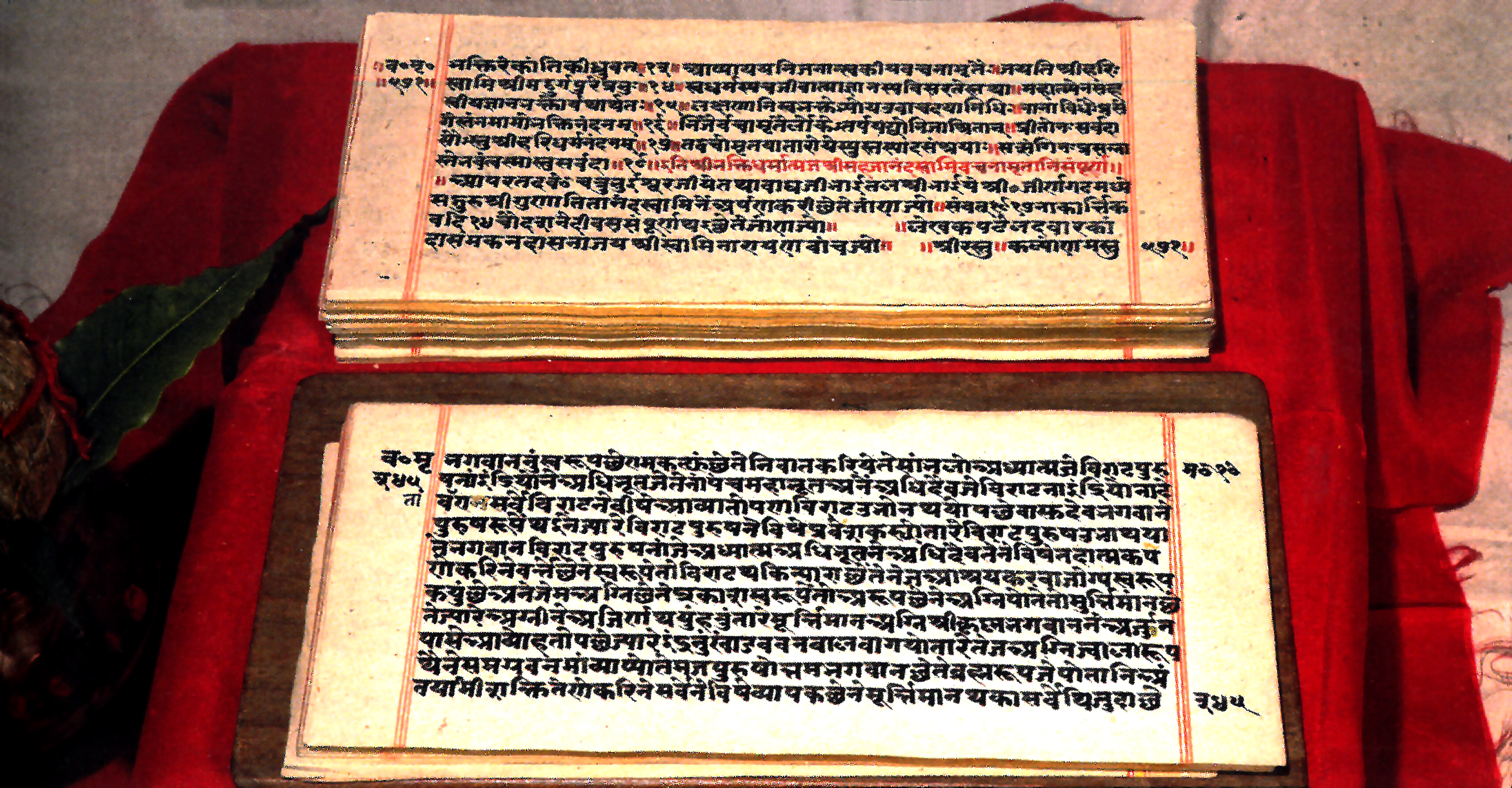
Vachanamrut manuscript

The Vachanamrut (IAST: Vacanāmṛta, lit. "immortalising ambrosia in the form of words") is a sacred text consisting of 273 religious discourses delivered by Swaminarayan from 1819 to 1829 CE and is considered the principal theological text within the Swaminarayan Sampradaya of Hinduism. Compiled by five of his senior disciples, Swaminarayan edited and approved the scripture. As followers believe Swaminarayan to be Parabrahman, or God, the Vachanamrut is considered a direct revelation from God and thus a theological essence and the most precise interpretation of the Upanishads, Bhagavad Gita, and other important Hindu scriptures.

Various branches of the Swaminarayan Sampradaya differ in their belief of how to attain moksha. The Narnarayan and Laxminarayan Gadis believe moksha is attained by worshiping the sacred images of Swaminarayan installed by acharyas. In BAPS, followers emphasize the role of God manifesting through the Aksharbrahman guru to attain moksha. This scripture is read by followers regularly and discourses are conducted daily in Swaminarayan temples around the world.

== Etymology ==
The name given to the collection of Swaminarayan’s sermons is “Vachanamrut,” a compound word derived from two Gujarati words: vachan (vacan), meaning “words,” and amrut (amṛta), meaning “immortalising nectar.” Thus, Vachanamrut translates to “immortalising ambrosia in the form of words,” as it is believed that Swaminarayan's teaching in this scripture deliver eternal liberation An individual discourse within the collection is also called a Vachanamrut.

== Development of the scripture ==
=== Authorship ===
The Vachanamrut is a chronological anthology of 273 religious discourses delivered by Lord Swaminarayan towards the end of his life, between 1819 and 1829 CE. Although the Vachanamrut is received in text form, it is revered in the tradition because of Swaminarayan's spoken words captured within it.

Five of Swaminarayan's senior disciples, Gopalanand Swami (Gopālānanda Svāmī), Muktanand Swami (Muktānanda Svāmī), Nityanand Swami (Nityānanda Svāmī), Shukanand Swami (Śukānanda Svāmī) and Brahmanand Swami (Brahmānanda Svāmī), transcribed and compiled the discourses. The Ahmedabad diocese within the Swaminarayan Sampradaya accepts Brahmanand Swami (Brahmānanda Svāmī) as a fifth editor. The compilers' scholarly aptitude, literary and poetic expertise, and transparency contribute to the merits of the Vachanamrut.

=== Language ===
The compilers wrote the text in Gujarati, the vernacular of the region in which Swaminarayan delivered his discourses. Although Swaminarayan was from a Hindi-speaking region of present-day Uttar-Pradesh, he adopted the Gujarati language for his followers. In 1859, a front-ranking Gujarati monthly quoted specimens from the Vachanamrut showing how Swaminarayan raised the standard of Gujarati prose.

The Vachanamrut has also been translated from Gujarati to other languages, like English, Hindi, Telugu, Tamil, and Marathi. Brahmanand Swami translated the Vachanamrut to the Vraj language. The Shri Harivakyasudhasindhu (Śrī Harivākyasudhāsindhu) is the Vachanamrut's Sanskrit adaptation by Shatanand Muni (Śatānanda Muni).

=== History and creation ===
The compilers of the Vachanamrut began documenting and editing Swaminarayan’s discourses in 1819 CE and collected about 2,000 sermons over ten years. At Swaminarayan’s instruction, to keep the text at a manageable size without excessive repetition, they selected a total of 262 sermons. An additional 11 are accepted as canonical by the Ahmedabad diocese, totaling 273.

The first discourse occurred on 21 November 1819, and the last discourse occurred on 25 July 1829 – both in Gadhada. In Loya 7, the 115th discourse which took place on 8 December 1820, Nityanand Swami presents Swaminarayan with the text for his review and approval. It states that Swaminarayan was "extremely pleased" with the manuscript. This documentation of approval further supports its authenticity.

== Structure ==
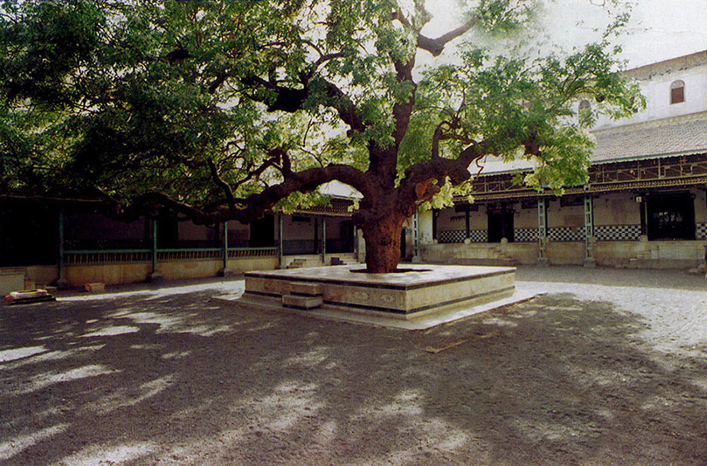
Courtyard of Dada Khachar's darbar in Gadhada

=== Preface ===
The Vachanamrut begins with a preface, termed, partharo (parthāro), that provides a detailed account of Swaminarayan’s activities, his interactions with devotees, and his appearance.

=== Title ===
Individual discourses are numbered, chronologically arranged, and categorized based on the location where they were delivered. The discourses took place across various towns and villages of Gujarat, India, specifically Gadhada, Sarangpur, Kariyani, Loya, Panchala, Vartal, Amdavad, Ashlali, and Jetalpur. An additional section, accepted by the Ahmedabad diocese, includes discourses from Amdavad, Ashlali, and Jetalpur. While individual discourses were untitled in early manuscripts, with individual Vachanamruts referred to only by their section and number, Gunatitanand Swami and the swamis of the Junagadh mandir created titles for individual discourses to serve as mnemonic tools. The BAPS Swaminarayan Sanstha uses these titles in its version of the text, which is an exact printed version of the Vachanamrut text published in 1928 under the auspices of Acharya Shripatiprasad of the Vartal diocese.

=== Introductory paragraph ===
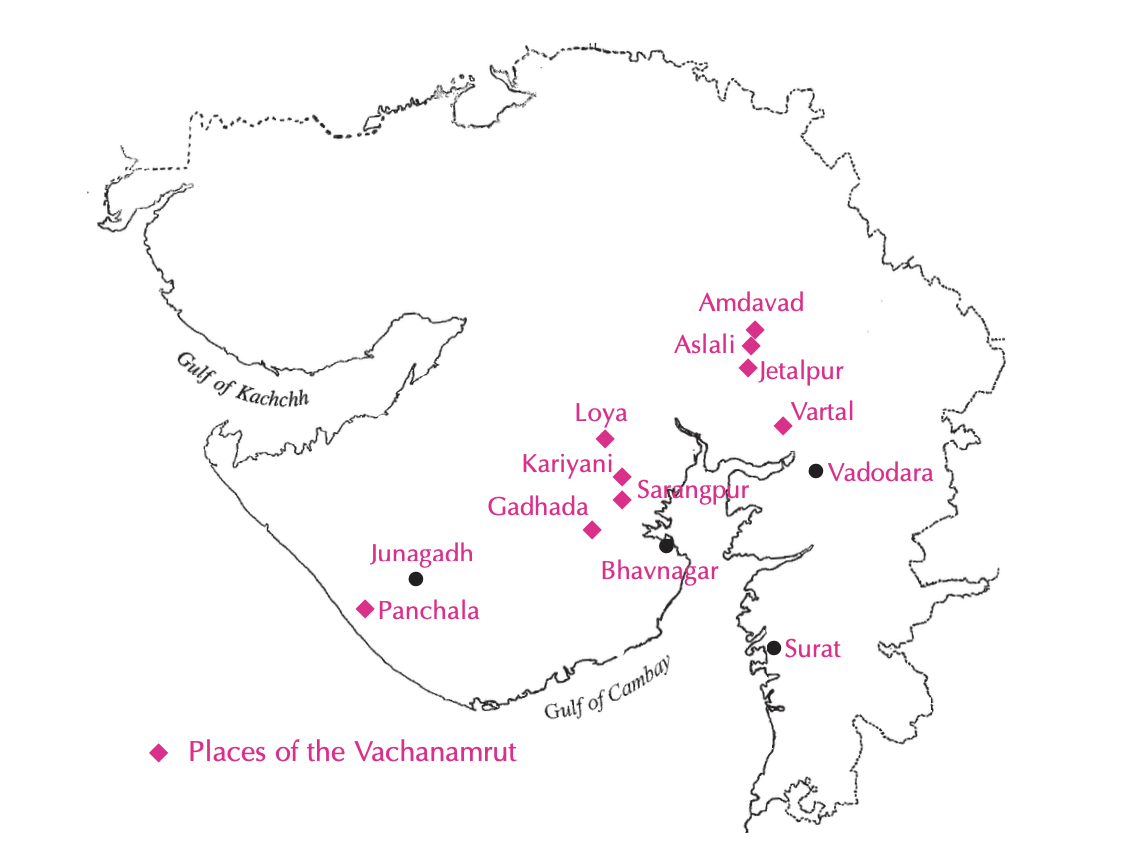
Map of Gujarat showing the villages where the Vachanamrut was recorded

One of the compilers, Muktanand Swami, was instructed by Swaminarayan to include the precise date of each discourse and names of who asked questions in the assembly. The introductory paragraph also notes the setting and atmosphere of the assembly and describes the audience seated. Furthermore, Swaminarayan himself is described with intricate detail with mention to the colour and style of his clothes and adornments. Occasionally, the seat upon which Swaminarayan is seated and the direction in which he is facing is detailed.

Regarding the details and precise dating present in the introductory paragraphs of each Vachanamrut, John Carmen, Professor of Comparative Religion at Harvard, notes that the inclusion of such information in a scriptural text nullifies a common Western misunderstanding that religious India lacks a sense of history.

=== Style of discourse ===
The style of discourse is highly dialogical and didactic, with most in the form of a question-and-answer session similar to the Upanishadic tradition of guru-disciple dialogue in which dialogues occur between the guru and pupils. These sermons were not restricted to any social group or gender as monks, scholars, peasants, craftsmen, and women were all present in the assemblies and all actively participated in the dialogue.

== Content ==
In the Vachanamrut, Swaminarayan outlines his theology and its ultimate goal, moksha (mokṣa), a spiritual state characterized by eternal bliss and devotion to God.

=== Theology ===
==== The essence of Vedic corpus and Hindu texts ====
Swaminarayan states in Gadhada II-28 and Gadhada III-10 that his teachings reflect the fundamentals he identified from various authoritative Hindu scriptures, like the Vedas, Upanishads, Shrimad Bhagavatam and Bhagavad Gita.

===== Ontology =====
In Vachanamarut Gadhada I-7, Swaminarayan explains that there are five eternal existential entities: jiva (jīva), ishwar (iśvara), maya (māyā), Aksharbrahman (Akṣarabrahman, also Akshara, Akṣara, or Brahman), Parabrahman (Parabrahman, or Purushottam, Puruṣottama).

A critical aspect of the ontological entities presented by Swaminarayan is the interpretation and description of Akshar. Shankara, Ramanuja, and others shift the meaning of Akshar to either Supreme Being (God), jada-prakruti, or mukta atma. In contrast, Swaminarayan explains Akshar is a distinct reality with four different forms, including Parabrahman’s abode, the personal servant of Parabrahman in that divine abode, the sentient substratum pervading and supporting creation (chidakash, cidākāśa) and the Aksharbrahman Guru present on earth.

In Gadhada I-63, Swaminarayan describes the prominence and vastness of Akshar relative to other entities to emphasize the need to understand Akshar first before one can understand God (Parabrahman) perfectly and completely.

===== Dynamics of spiritual life =====
Swaminarayan explains the ultimate goal of his theology is moksha, the release from the ignorance borne of maya and the cycle of births and deaths to attain infinite bliss through endless devotion to God. Different denominations within the faith have varying interpretations of attaining moksha.

In Gadhada III-39, Swaminarayan describes maya as self-identification with the physical body, which also encompasses material possessions and personal talents. To overcome this ignorance, Swaminarayan explains in Gadhada II-20 that an individual must become brahmarup (brahmarūp), an elevated state attained after developing the qualities of Aksharbrahman. The distinction between the jiva (i.e. individual) and Aksharbrahman is not lost in this higher state.

While an individual can persevere for this state, only through God’s grace can it be attained. In Sarangpur 11, Swaminarayan defines ekantik dharma (ekāntik dharma), the four-fold practice requisite to receive this grace. Ekantik dharma consists of dharma (dharma; adherence to codes of conduct), gnan (jñāna; knowledge of the atman), vairagya (vairāgya; detachment from worldly pleasure), and bhakti (bhakti; devotion coupled with the understanding of God’s greatness).

Ekantik dharma is perfected through associating with an ekantik sant, which Swaminarayan explains as following the sants commands (in Gadhada I-78 and Gadhada II-51), reflecting upon his virtues (in Gadhada I-58), and offering worship to him (in Vartal 5 and Sarangpur 3).

The Narnarayan and Laxminarayan Gadis believe moksha is attained by worshiping the sacred images of Swaminarayan installed by acharyas. Baps believes the jiva needs the guidance of the Aksharbrahman Guru to transcend maya and become brahmarup to reside in the service of Parabrahman.

== Role in the Swaminarayan Sampradaya ==
=== Engaging with the text ===
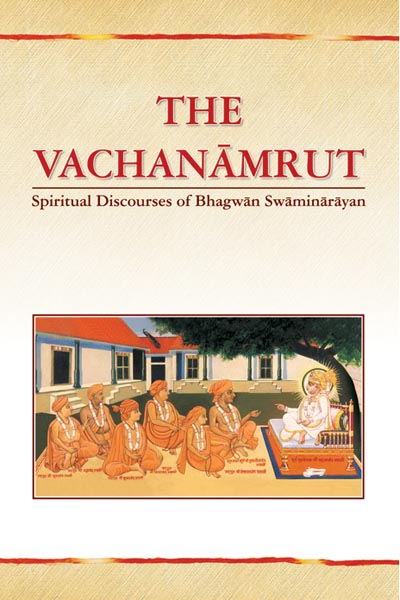
Cover of the BAPS edition of the Vachanamrut

Devotees regularly read the Vachanamrut with the intention of understanding and implementing Swaminarayan’s teachings, which form the foundation of the Swaminarayan Sampradaya. Regular lectures and discussions on the Vachanamrut in Swaminarayan mandirs foster spiritual development. The Vachanamrut is also used for recitation and exegesis in daily and weekly spiritual assemblies in Swaminarayan temples. Douglas Brear described a discussion of the Vachanamrut as a forum in which the presenter would use examples from everyday life to explain difficult concepts but also encourage others to participate with questions or personal examples.

To accommodate the growing audience, the Vachanamrut has been translated from Gujarati to English, Hindi, Telugu, Tamil and Marathi. Additionally, the Vachanamrut is available in a cross-platform digital application format with extensive annotations and study aids.

=== Interpreting the text ===
Swaminarayan himself states in the discourse Loya 11, “One should only hear the sacred scriptures from the Satpurush (Satpuruṣa), but never from an unholy person.” Again, in Vadtal 12, Swaminarayan states, “...no one can ever attain liberation by listening to the Gitā or the Śrimad-Bhāgavata from a person who does not have faith in God coupled with the knowledge of his greatness.” Interpretations by the Baps denomination, teaches that the Aksharbrahman Guru is the most qualified person to provide interpretations of the text. Because it is only he, who is Aksharbrahman (Brahman), fully established in Parabrahman (niṣtḥa), and possessing the direct and absolute realization of the scriptures (śrotriyam).
