= Nityanand Swami (Paramhansa) =

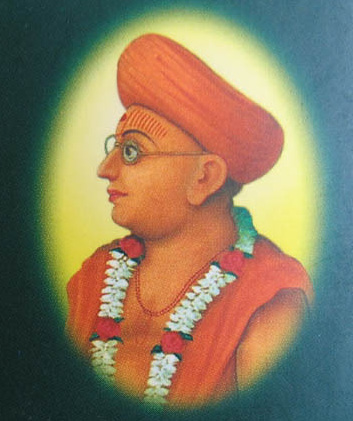
Nityanand Swami

Nityanand Swami (Devanagari: नित्यानन्द स्वामी) (1793–1852) born as Dinmani Sharma, was one of the senior Paramhansa’s initiated by Swaminarayan. He was given the name Nityanand as a reflection of his lasting joyful persona. Prior to his initiation, he had already established an impressive knowledge base through his association with great scholars and pundits. Generally recognized as one of the foremost scholars in the Swaminarayan Sampraday on Hindu scriptures, Nityanand Swami's knowledge and abilities were often displayed in scriptural debates common for the era. In line with his inclination for scriptural studies, Nityanand Swami was also appointed as of the five compilers of the Vachanamrut. Nityanand Swami was regarded as the incarnation of Vyasa

== Biography ==
=== Early life ===
In 1793, Dinmani Sharma was born to a Brahmin family in town of Datiya which still sits in the Lucknow district, Uttar Pradesh in the northern part of India. From a young age, he had shown an inclination towards studying and was sent to a school in Kashi, one of the preeminent arts and scriptural learning centers in India. There, young Dinmani came to realize that one cannot attain the bliss of God merely through the study of scriptures, but rather, through the association of an enlightened being.

Once he completed his studies in Kashi, Dinmani set out on a quest to find such an enlightened being. His travels took him from Kashi in the north to Jagannath Puri in the east to Rameshwaram in the south. Eventually, Dinmani went to Gujarat in the west and visited Dwarika. It was here that Dinmani first heard the name of Swaminarayan. Dinmani met Swaminarayan in the town of Unza and upon first meeting decided that his journey has ended and recognized that Swaminarayan was the enlightened being he sought. Dinmani was later initiated as a Sadhu by Swaminarayan in Meghpur and given the name Nityanand Swami.

=== Life as a Sadhu ===
Even though he had studied a great amount, Swaminarayan instructed Nityanand Swami to continue further studies. Nityanand Swami was considered one of the foremost scholars and debaters of Hindu scriptures of his era. Along with Gopalanand Swami, Muktanand Swami and Shukanand Swami, Nityanand Swami was one of the four compilers of the Vachanamrutam, the written recordings of the sermons of Swaminarayan.

Nityanand Swami was one of the first to openly state their belief that Swaminarayan was parabrahman. He was steadfast in following the words and deeds of Swaminarayan.

Nityanand Swami died on 1852 in the town of Vadtal, India.

== Life's works ==
Besides his work in compiling the Vachanamrutam, Nityanand Swami also wrote many other volumes which included the commentary on the Shikshapatri, a code of ethics written by Swaminarayan, the Hari Digvijay, a 49-chapter volume which attempts to establish that Swaminarayan is supreme, the Hari Kavach, the Shri Hanuman Kavach, the Nishkam Shuddhi, the Avatar Charitra, and a number of others.
