= Chhapaiya =

- Village
- Location in Uttar Pradesh, India Chhapaiya (India)
- Coordinates: 26°57′57″N 82°23′23″E
- Country: India
- State: Uttar Pradesh
- District: Gonda
- Elevation: 320 m (1,050 ft)

Population
  - Total: 3,000

Language
  - Official: Hindi
- Time zone: UTC+5:30 (IST)
- Nearest city: Maskanva
- Sex ratio: 900:1000 ♂/♀
- Literacy: 50%%
- Lok Sabha constituency: Gonda
- Vidhan Sabha constituency: Gaura

Chhapaiya is a village in Gonda District in the Indian state of Uttar Pradesh, about 50 km from the district headquarters of Gonda, and 40 km from Ayodhya.

== Points of interest ==
Shree Swaminarayan Mandir in Chhapaiya, The Birth Place of Shree Swaminarayan

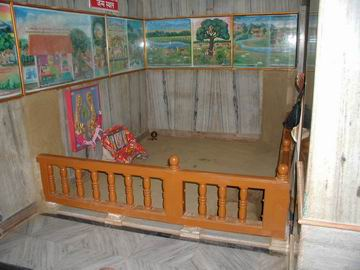
Birth location of Shri Swaminarayan

It is the birthplace of Bhagavan Swaminarayan. Bhagavan Swaminarayan was born there on 3 April 1781 as Ghanshyam. This village became a pilgrimage destination for his followers worldwide.

The Swaminarayan temple at Chhapaiya went through renovation completed by 2016.

== Place of pilgrimage ==
The following are holy places in Chhapaiya:

=== Ghanshyam Bhavan ===
Ghanshyam Bhavan is a monument sited on Bhagwan Swaminarayan's birthplace. A temple on this place was erected by Acharya Ayodhyaprasadji Maharaj in 1863, after Bhagwan Swaminarayan's passing in 1830. After 47 years another temple was built by Acharya Purushottamprasadji Maharaj in 1910. It is undergoing reconstruction in marble. It was a project started in 2004 by Acharya Tejendraprasadji Maharaj. The marble-decorated room is on the ground floor.

=== Other sites ===
Shri Swaminarayan Mandir is near Ghanshyam Bhavan. Narayan Sarovar is the sacred water pool where Ghanshyam often bathed. It is just outside the mandir complex. Trikonyu Khetar (Triangular Farm) is where Ghanshyam sent birds into samadhi. Meen Sarovar is a small lake (dry during the summer) where Ghanshyam brought dead fish back to life and instructed the fisherman not to kill fish for a living. A shrine is sited at the place where the demon Kalidutt, who came to kill him was defeated.
