= Swaminarayan Mantra =

Main mantra of the Swaminarayan sect

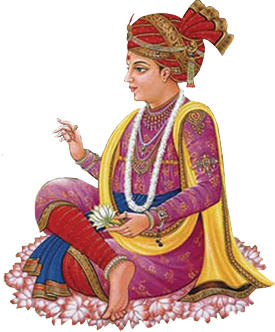
Swaminarayan, founder of the Swaminarayan Sampradaya

The Swaminarayan mantra, "Swaminarayan," is a mantra used by the Swaminarayan Sampradaya. It is a compound of two words: Swami ("master, lord") and Narayan, that is, Vishnu c.q. Purushottam. According to the Swaminarayan-tradition, the Swaminarayan Mantra was introduced and explained by Sahajanand Swami, shortly after the death of his predecessor, Ramanand Swami, whereafter Sahajanand Swami came popularly to be known as Swaminarayan.

Devotees chant the Swaminarayan mantra to offer worship, to allay distress, to pray for the welfare of others, and at the end-of-life. Several scriptures of the Swaminarayan Sampradaya, such as the Swamini Vato, Harililamrut, and Bhaktachintamani, describe the power and efficacy of the Swaminarayan mantra for one who chants it.

== Origins ==
Swaminarayan was given the mantra, ‘Brahmāhaṃ Kṛṣṇadāso'smi,’ which means “I am Brahman, servant of Lord Krishna”. In 1801, when Sahajanand Swami succeeded Ramanand Swami as the spiritual head of the Ramanand sampradāya, he continued using this mantra for the purpose of initiating followers into the sampradaya, however he sought to introduce a new mantra to be used for daily worship and chanting. As Adbhutanand Swami, an ordained swami during Sahajanand Swami's time, puts it, “at that time, Rama-Krishna Hare Govind Hare, Narayan,” a chant composed of a number of names [of Vishnu] was typically chanted. Discontinuing that practice, Sahajanand Swami established ‘Swaminarayan’—a name made up of two meaningful words—as the mantra [to be chanted thereon].”

According to Swaminarayan-tradition, Sahajanand Swami revealed this new mantra and explained its meaning to his followers for the first time on December 31, 1801, shortly after the death of Ramanand Swami. On that day, Sahajanand Swami had held a public assembly in Faneni, Gujarat. A spiritual aspirant named Shitaldas who had arrived in Faneni seeking the guidance and blessings of Ramanand Swami had just learned of the latter's death. Disappointed, he planned to return home but was persuaded to stay by Sahajanand Swami. Shitaldas was thus present in the assembly when Sahajanand Swami introduced his new “Swaminarayan” mantra. Upon uttering the Swaminarayan mantra, Shitaldas entered a trance state, in which he saw the twenty-four avataras of Vishnu merge into Sahajanand Swami. He also saw Sahajanand Swami surrounded by numerous liberated beings, including Ramanand Swami. When Shitaldas emerged from his trance state and narrated this to the rest of the assembly, others requested Sahajanand Swami to also grant them this vision. Sahajanand Swami instructed everyone to chant the Swaminarayan mantra, and the entire assembly experienced this same vision. Thereafter, Sahajanand Swami enjoined all his followers to chant the Swaminarayan mantra in their daily worship, declaring that whosoever chanted it would attain all their spiritual aims.

== Meaning ==
The Swaminarayan mantra is a compound of two words, Swami (an initiated ascetic) and Narayan, that is, Vishnu c.q. Purushottam. ‘Swami’ denotes the adjective of Narayan, as in the form of which God incarnated. ‘Narayan' denotes Purushottam, or God, understood to be Sahajanand Swami himself.

There are two main interpretations of the mantra, with the original branches believing the name refers to one entity, namely Narayan. Some later branches, including the BAPS, believe that that "Swami" denotes Aksharbrahman (God's ideal devotee), namely Gunatitanand Swami, as identified by Sahajanand Swami, and Narayan denotes Parabrahman or Purushottam(God), that is, Sahajanand Swami himself.

According to the BAPS, composed of these two words, the mantra encapsulates the central principle of Sahajanand Swami’s theological teachings of five eternal and distinct entities.

In his teachings, Sahajanand Swami reveals five eternal and distinct entities: Purushottam, Akshar, maya, ishwars, and jivas. Jivas and ishwars are souls who, until liberated, are bound by maya, a deluding force that induces attachment to the body and the world, resulting in rebirth. Akshar is eternally beyond maya and devoted to Purushottam, or God. Souls who seek to transcend maya must first associate and identify with Akshar incarnate to attain the virtues of Akshar necessary for liberation from maya. In the liberated state, the souls offer exclusive devotion to Purushottam.

These theological principles are reinforced in chanting the mantra. Specifically, in chanting “Swami”, a devotee contemplates oneself as separate from one's physical body and one with Akshar—transcendent of maya and constantly engrossed in God. While chanting “Narayan”, having already identified with Akshar, one focuses on devotion to Narayan, or Purushottam, and contemplates the glory and grandeur of Purushottam. So, in chanting the Swaminarayan mantra, an adherent reflects on Sahajanand Swami's central theological principle and aims to internalize it.

Beyond its function as a mantra, the word Swaminarayan also came to be used in social discourse in a variety of ways. As the Swaminarayan mantra began to be widely chanted by Sahajanand Swami's adherents, Sahajanand Swami became popularly known in society as Swaminarayan, and the sampradaya (or religious group) he led became popularly known as the Swaminarayan Sampradaya.

== Function ==
Dutch Indologist Jan Gonda notes that while some mantras are uttered for material gain, as a tool of propitiation, or as an expression of praise, other mantras are used by aspirants seeking spiritual upliftment rather than material concerns. Such spiritual-focused mantras, notes Gonda, “exist eternally, representing principles which are…aspects of the eternal truth.” It is in this context that popular Hindu mantras such as Oṃ and the Swaminarayan mantra are understood.

== Praxis ==
Devotees generally chant the Swaminarayan mantra to offer worship, to allay distress, to spiritually purify oneself, to pray for the welfare of others, and at the end-of-life.

Firstly, during daily worship, like the morning puja (pūjā; personal worship of God), followers chant the mantra while turning the mala and focusing on the murtis, or sacred images, of God. Outside of these times, devotees aim to chant the mantra to offer worship while performing any other mundane activities, such as preparing food or traveling.

Secondly, followers chant the mantra to alleviate distress. In particular, they chant the mantra to endure pain as well as to draw courage and strength by seeking God's protection when threatened by danger.

Thirdly, Swaminarayan instructs followers to chant the Swaminarayan mantra to overcome impure thoughts and to atone for past transgressions, and otherwise spiritually purify oneself.

Fourthly, devotees chant the mantra while praying for others. Following the terrorist attack on Gandhinagar Akshardham in 2002, Pramukh Swami Maharaj, the fifth spiritual successor to Swaminarayan, chanted the mantra and advised others to do so while praying for a peaceful resolution. Devotees also chanted the Swaminarayan mantra while praying on behalf of all those affected by the COVID-19 pandemic.

Fifthly, devotees chant Swaminarayan both individually and collectively as a means of praying to God for the fulfillment of their spiritual or otherwise positive desires.

Lastly, Swaminarayan explains that devotees at the end of life should chant the Swaminarayan mantra to focus on attaining moksha. The mantra is subsequently chanted during various final rites and rituals, like bathing the body of the deceased.

== Glory of the mantra in Swaminarayan Scriptures ==
Several texts of the Swaminarayan Sampradaya describe the power and efficacy of the Swaminarayan mantra for one who knows its meaning and chants it with faith. For instance, in the Harililamrut, Dalpatram writes that the Swaminarayan mantra contains within it the essence of all scriptures and the power of thousands of other mantras. In the Swamini Vato, Gunatitanand Swami also illustrates the Swaminarayan mantra's power in its ability to help devotees overcome any difficulties by comparing the mantra to an antidote capable of neutralizing the venom of a black cobra. Moreover, illustrating its salvific nature, Dalpatram writes in the Harililamrut that one who faithfully chants the Swaminarayan mantra will be released from the burdens of past deeds, which bind the soul in a cycle of births and deaths. Similarly, the Purushottam Prakash, Swamini Vato and Bhaktachintamani also expound the redemptive qualities of the Swaminarayan mantra, stating that devotees who chant the mantra will attain moksha, the pinnacle of spiritual attainment characterized by eternal bliss and devotion to God.

== Sources ==
- Adbhutanand, Swami. Shriharini Adbhut Vartao. Vadtal: Shastri Harjivandas.
- Harshad, Dave. Bhagwan Shri Swaminarayan - Part 1. Swaminarayan Aksharpith.
- Mukundcharandas, Sadhu (2007). Hindu Rites & Rituals: Sentiments, Sacraments and Symbols. Ahmedabad, India.
- Paramtattvadas, Sadhu. "Mantra part 2". BAPS.
- Paramtattvadas, Sadhu (2017). An introduction to Swaminarayan Hindu theology. Cambridge, United Kingdom. ISBN 978-1-316-66600-5. OCLC 1004609905.
- Patel, I., Iva (2018). "Swaminarayan". In Jain, Pankaj; Sherma, Rita; Khanna, Madhu (eds.). Hinduism and Tribal Religions. Encyclopedia of Indian Religions. Dordrecht: Springer Netherlands. pp. 1–6. doi:10.1007/978-94-024-1036-5_541-1. ISBN 978-94-024-1036-5.
- Williams, Raymond Brady (2018). An introduction to Swaminarayan Hinduism (Third ed.). Cambridge, United Kingdom: Cambridge University Press. ISBN 978-1-108-42114-0. OCLC 1038043717.
