= Vadtal =

- village
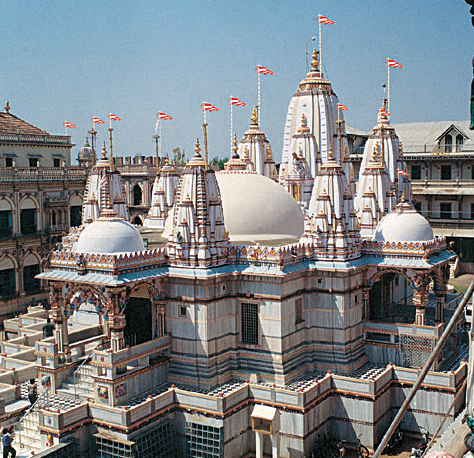
- Vadtal Swaminarayan Temple

- Location in Gujarat, India Vadtal (India)
- Coordinates: 22.59°N 72.87°E
- Country: India
- State: Gujarat
- District: Kheda
- Founder: Sarvopari Swaminarayan

Languages
  - Official: Gujarati, Hindi
- Time zone: UTC+5:30 (IST)
- Vehicle registration: GJ
- Website: gujaratindia.com

Vadtal is located in the Kheda district of Gujarat, India. It is the pilgrim centre of Swaminarayan Sampraday and the headquarters of Swaminarayan's temple. Gomati is a holy lake in Vadtal.

In 2011, ONGC announced that it would begin drilling operations in Vadtal in search of oil and gas. Its previous exploration in 2007 in Vadtal had found an oil field, which it is developing.

== Transport ==
Reaching Vadtal is very easy. Vadtal is connected via State Highway 5 km far. Vadtal is also connected with two Cities named as Nadiad and Anand. Vadtal is 15 km far from Both the cities. It takes a 30-min drive from both the places via public or private transport. Reaching Vadtal from Anand is even better as frequency of city bus is available after every 30min.

Vadtal is also a railway terminus. A 14 mile long broad-gauge line was opened in 1929 connecting it with Anand, benefitting pilgrims visiting the Swaminarayan Temple.
