= Swami Ramanand =

Founder of the Uddhava Sampradaya

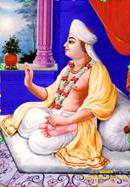
A portrait of Ramanand Swami

Swami Ramanand (born Rama Sharma) was born into a Brahmin family in Ayodhya in Vikram Samvat 1795 (1738 AD). His parents were Ajay Sharma (father) and Sumati (mother). He was considered to be the incarnation of Uddhava, a close friend of Krishna. Ramanand Swami was the founder and head of the Uddhava Sampradaya. Ramanand Swami adopted the Vishishtadvaita doctrine of the Vaishnava which was first propounded by Ramanuja several centuries earlier. In his travels to Srirangam in southern India in his early life, Ramanand Swami said that Ramanuja gave him diksha (initiation) in a dream and appointed him in his line as an acharya. Ramanand Swami then travelled west to Saurastra to spread the philosophy of Ramanuja. Before dying in 1858, Ramanand Swami passed the reins of the Uddhava Sampradaya to Swaminarayan.

== Swaminarayan and initiation ==
Ramanand Swami was the guru of Swaminarayan.

Swaminarayan left his home at age 11 on 28 June 1792 after the death of both his parents. He began a journey across India that took 7 years 1 month and 11 days. He took the name Nilkanth Varni while on his journey. Nilkanth Varni travelled across India and parts of Nepal in search of an ashram or sampradaya that practised what he considered a correct understanding of Vedanta, Samkhya, Yoga, and Pancaratra (the four primary schools of Hinduism).

To find an ashram that correctly practised the meaning of these four primary schools of Hinduism, he asked the following five questions on the basic Vaishnava Vedanta categories:

- What is jīva?
- What is Īśvara?
- What is Maya?
- What is Brahman?
- What is Parā brahman?

While on his journey, Nilkanth Varni mastered ashtanga yoga or eightfold yoga. In the year 1799, Nilkanth Varni's journey as a yogi eventually concluded in Loj, a village in the Junagadh district of Gujarat. In Loj, Nilkanth Varni was introduced to Muktanand Swami, a senior disciple of Ramanand Swami who answered the five questions satisfactorily. He then persuaded Nilkanth Varni to stay to get an opportunity to meet Ramanand Swami, whose disciple Nilkanth Varni later became.
