= Swaminarayan =

Founder of Swaminarayan Sampradaya (1781–1830)

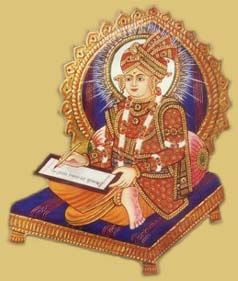
- Illustration of Swaminarayan writing the Shikshapatri

Personal life
- Born: Ghanshyam Pande; 3 April 1781 Chhapaiya, Kingdom of Oudh (present-day Uttar Pradesh, India)
- Died: 1 June 1830 (aged 49) Gadhada, Baroda State (present-day Gujarat, India)

Religious life
- Religion: Hinduism
- Founder of: Swaminarayan Sampradaya

Religious career
- Teacher: Swami Ramanand
- Successor: Ayodhyaprasad and Raghuvira

Swaminarayan (IAST: Svāmīnārāyaṇa; 3 April 1781 – 1 June 1830), also known as Sahajanand Swami, was a yogi and ascetic believed by followers to be a manifestation of Krishna or the highest manifestation of Purushottama, around whom the Swaminarayan Sampradaya developed.

In 1800, he was initiated into the Uddhava sampradaya by his guru, Swami Ramanand, and was given the name Sahajanand Swami. Despite opposition, in 1802, Ramanand handed over the leadership of the Uddhava Sampradaya to him before his death. According to the Swaminarayan tradition, Sahajanand Swami became known as Swaminarayan, and the Uddhava Sampradaya became known as the Swaminarayan Sampradaya, after a gathering in which he taught the Swaminarayan Mantra to his followers.

He emphasized "moral, personal, and social betterment," and ahimsa. He is also remembered within the sect for undertaking reforms for women and the poor, and performing large-scale non-violent yajñas (fire sacrifices).

During his lifetime, Swaminarayan institutionalized his charisma and beliefs in various ways. He oversaw the construction of six mandirs to facilitate devotional worship of God by his followers, and encouraged the creation of a scriptural tradition, including the Shikshapatri, which he wrote in 1826. In 1826, through a legal document titled the Lekh, Swaminarayan created two dioceses, the Laxmi Narayan Dev Gadi (Vadtal Gadi) and Nar Narayan Dev Gadi (Ahmedabad Gadi), with a hereditary leadership of acharyas and their wives, beginning with two of his nephews whom he formally adopted, who were authorized to install statues of deities in temples and to initiate ascetics.

== Biography ==
=== Childhood as Ghanshyam ===
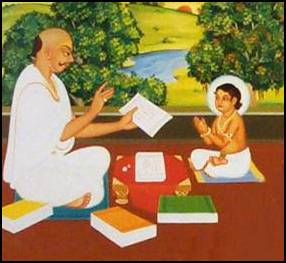
Dharmadev teaching Ghanshyam from the scriptures

Swaminarayan was born on 3 April 1781 (Chaitra Sud 9, Samvat 1837) in Chhapaiya, a village near Ayodhya, then under the Nawab of Oudh, in present-day Indian state of Uttar Pradesh. Born into the Brahmin or priestly caste of Sarvariya, Swaminarayan was named Ghanshyam Pande by his parents, Hariprasad Pande (father, also known as Dharmadev) and Premvati Pande (mother, also known as Bhaktimata and Murtidevi). The birth of Swaminarayan coincided with the Hindu festival of Rama Navami, celebrating the birth of Rama. The ninth lunar day in the fortnight of the waxing moon in the month of Chaitra (March–April), is celebrated as both Rama Navami and Swaminarayan Jayanti by Swaminarayan followers. This celebration also marks the beginning of a ritual calendar for the followers.

Swaminarayan had an elder brother, Rampratap Pande, and a younger brother, Ichcharam Pande. He is said to have mastered the scriptures, including the Vedas, the Upanishads, the Puranas, the Ramayana, and the Mahabharata by the age of seven.

=== Travels as Nilkanth Varni ===
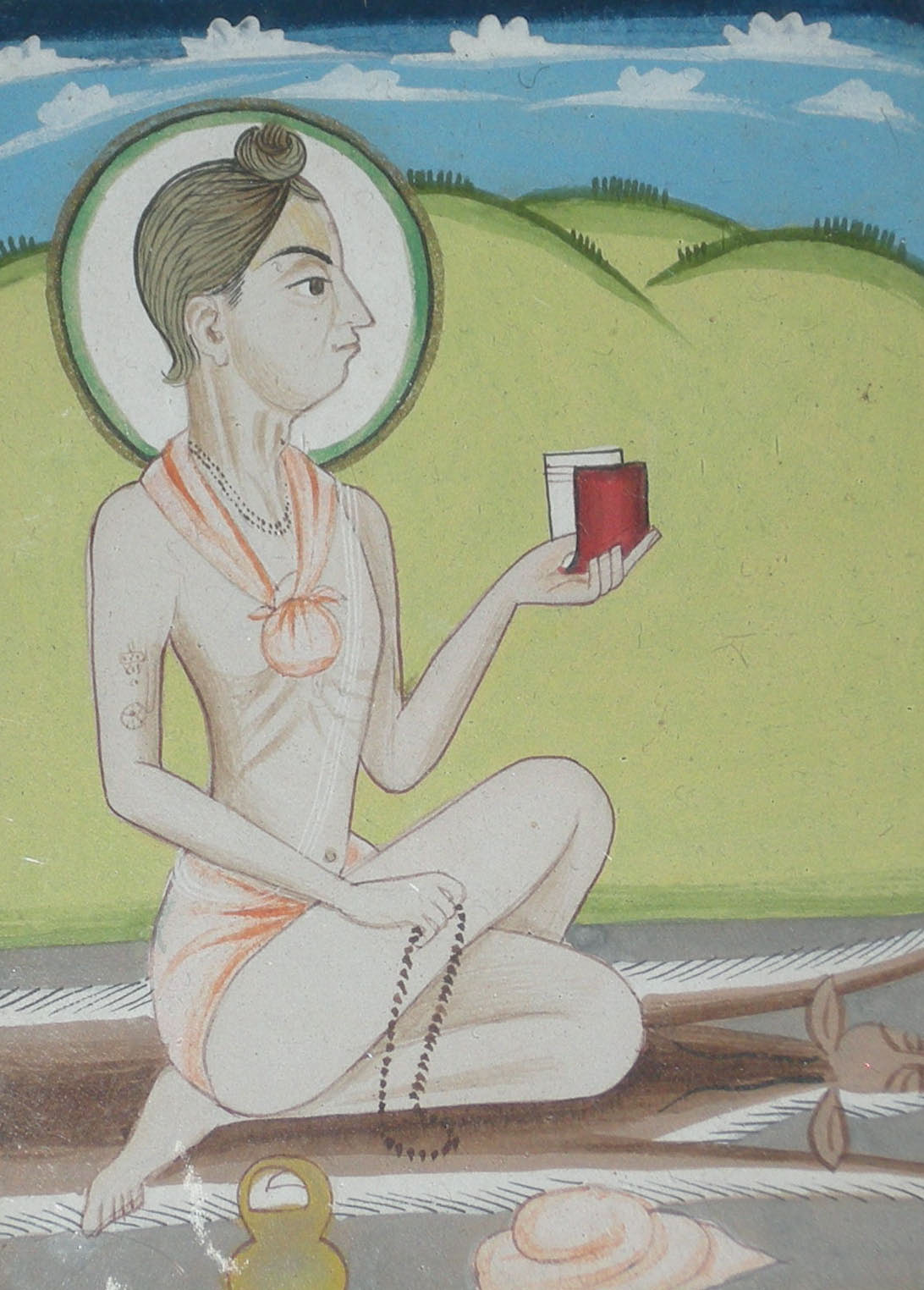
Nilkanth Varni during his travels

After the death of his parents, Ghanshyam Pande left his home on 29 June 1792 (Ashadh Sud 10, Samvat 1849) at the age of 11. He took the name Nilkanth Varni while on his journey. Nilkanth Varni travelled across India and parts of Nepal in search of an ashram, or hermitage, that practiced what he considered a correct understanding of Vedanta, Samkhya, Yoga, and Pancaratra. To find such an ashram, Nilkanth Varni asked the following five questions on the basic Vaishnava Vedanta categories:

- What is Jiva?
- What is Ishvara?
- What is Maya?
- What is Brahman?
- What is Parabrahman?

While on his journey, Nilkanth Varni mastered Astanga yoga (eightfold yoga) in a span of nine months under the guidance of an aged yogic master named Gopal Yogi. In Nepal, it is said that he met King Rana Bahadur Shah and cured him of his stomach illness. As a result, the king freed all the ascetics he had imprisoned. Nilkanth Varni visited the Jagannath Temple in Puri as well as temples in Badrinath, Rameswaram, Nashik, Dwarka, and Pandharpur.

In 1799, after a seven-year journey, Nilkanth's travels as a yogi eventually concluded in Loj, a village in the Junagadh district of Gujarat. In Loj, Nilkanth Varni met Muktanand Swami, a senior disciple of Ramanand Swami. Muktanand Swami, who was 22 years older than Nilkanth, answered the five questions to Nilkanth's satisfaction. Nilkanth decided to stay for the opportunity to meet Ramanand Swami, whom he met a few months after his arrival in Gujarat. He later claimed in the Vachnamrut that during this period, he took up a severe penance to eliminate his mother's flesh and blood from his body so that the sign of his physical attachment to family, was completely removed.

=== Leadership as Sahajanand Swami ===
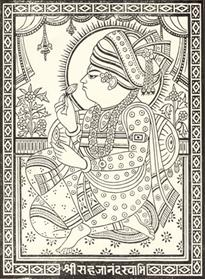
Traditional iconographical portrait of Swaminarayan

According to the sect, Nilkanth's understanding of the metaphysical and epistemological concepts of the pancha-tattvas (five eternal elements), together with his mental and physical discipline, inspired senior swamis of Ramanand Swami.

Nilkanth Varni received sannyasa initiation from Ramanand Swami on 20 October 1800, and with it was granted the names Sahajanand Swami and Narayan Muni to signify his new status.

At the age of 21, Sahajanand Swami was appointed successor to Ramanand Swami as the leader of the Uddhava Sampradaya by Ramanand Swami, prior to his death. His sucessessional was initially opposed by some members of the group who split off, but was soon accepted as the leader of the satsang and as a manifestation of god. The Uddhava Sampradaya henceforth came to be known as the Swaminarayan Sampradaya. According to sources he proclaimed the worship of one sole deity, Krishna or Narayana. Krishna was considered by him his own ishtadevata. In contrast with the Vaishnava sect known as the Radha-vallabha Sampradaya, he had a more puritanical approach, rather than the theological views of Krishna that are strongly capricious in character and imagery. While being a worshipper of Krishna, Swaminarayan rejected licentious elements in Krishnology in favor of worship in the mood of majesty, alike to earlier Vaishnava teachers, Ramanuja and Yamunacharya.

=== Manifestation belief ===
According to Swaminarayan-tradition, Sahajanand Swami was later known as Swaminarayan after the mantra "swaminarayan" which he taught at a gathering, in Faneni, a fortnight after the death of Ramanand Swami. According to this tradition he gave his followers this new mantra, known as the Swaminarayan mantra, to repeat in their rituals. When chanting this mantra, some devotees went into samadhi, (Note: The word samadhi has different meanings in Hinduism. It may refer to a form yogic deep meditation. As a cause of death, it refers to the act of consciously and intentionally leaving one's body at the time of death.) and claimed that they could see their personal gods.

As early as 1804, Swaminarayan, who was reported to have performed miracles, was described as a manifestation of God in the first work written by a disciple and paramahamsa, Nishkulanand Swami. (Note: In his discourses recorded in the Vachanamrut, Swaminarayan mentions that humans would not be able to withstand meeting god in his divine form, hence God takes human form (simultaneously living in his abode) so people can approach, understand and love him in the form of an Avatar.) This work, the Yama Danda, was the first piece of literature written within the Swaminarayan sect. Swaminarayan himself is said to have intimated that he was a manifestation of God in a meeting with Reginald Heber, the Lord Bishop of Calcutta, in 1825.

Some of Swaminarayan's followers believe he was an incarnation of Krishna. The images and stories of Swaminarayan and Krishna have coincided in the liturgy of the sect. The story of the birth of Swaminarayan parallels that of Krishna's birth from the scripture Bhagavata Purana. Most of his followers believe that Swaminarayan is the complete manifestation of Narayana or Purushottama Narayana - the Supreme Being and superior to other avatars.

The belief of many followers that their founder was the incarnation of the Supreme God has also drawn criticism. According to Professor Raymond B. Williams, Swaminarayan was criticized because he received large gifts from his followers and dressed and traveled as a Maharaja even though he had taken the vows of renunciation of the world. Swaminarayan responded that he accepts gifts for the emancipation of his followers.

=== Teaching ===
Swaminarayan encouraged his followers to combine devotion and dharma to lead a pious life. Using Hindu texts and rituals to form the base of his organisation, Swaminarayan founded what in later centuries would become a global organisation with strong Gujarati roots. He was particularly strict on the separation of sexes in temples. Swaminarayan was against the consumption of meat, alcohol or drugs, adultery, suicide, animal sacrifices, criminal activities and the appeasement of ghosts and tantric rituals. Alcohol consumption was forbidden by him even for medicinal purposes. Many of his followers took vows before becoming his disciple. He stated that four elements need to be conquered for ultimate salvation: dharma, bhakti (devotion), gnana (knowledge) and vairagya (detachment). Doctrinally, Swaminarayan was close to eleventh century philosopher Ramanuja and was critical of Adi Shankara's concept of Advaita, or monistic non-dualism. Swaminarayan's ontology maintained that the supreme being is not formless and that God always has a divine form. Swaminarayan's philosophy asserts that Parabrahman and Aksharabrahman are two distinct eternal realities.

=== Relations with other religions and the British Government ===
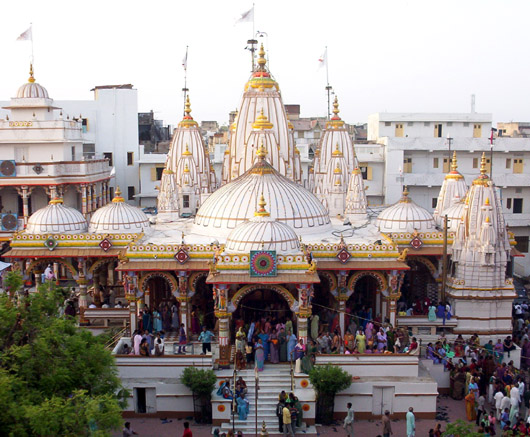
In 1822, the first Swaminarayan mandir was constructed on land granted by the British imperial government in Ahmedabad.

Swaminarayan strived to maintain good relationships with people of other religions, sometimes meeting prominent leaders. His followers cut across religious boundaries, including people of Muslim and Parsi backgrounds. Swaminarayan's personal attendants included Khoja Muslims. In Kathiawad, many Muslims wore kanthi necklaces given by Swaminarayan. He also had a meeting with Reginald Heber, Lord Bishop of Calcutta and a leader of Christians in India at the time. Bishop Heber mentions in his account of the meeting that about two hundred disciples of Swaminarayan accompanied him as his bodyguards mounted on horses and carrying Matchlocks and swords. Bishop Heber himself had about a hundred horse guards accompanying him (fifty horses and fifty muskets) and mentioned that it was humiliating for him to see two religious leaders meeting at the head of two small armies, his being the smaller contingent. As a result of the meeting, both leaders gained mutual respect for one another.

Swaminarayan enjoyed a good relationship with the government of the ruling East India Company. The first temple he built, in Ahmedabad, was built on 2,000 hectares (5,000 acres) of land given by the company government. The company officers gave it a 101-gun salute when it was opened. It was in an 1825 meeting with Reginald Heber that Swaminarayan is said to have intimated that he was a manifestation of Krishna. In 1830, Swaminarayan had a meeting with Sir John Malcolm, Governor of Bombay (1827 to 1830). According to Malcolm, Swaminarayan had helped bring some stability to a region that was considered lawless. During the meeting with Malcolm, Swaminarayan gave him a copy of the Shikshapatri. This copy of the Shikshapatri is currently housed at the Bodleian Library at University of Oxford.

Swaminarayan's followers described the influence of his teachings as a "Pax Swaminarayana", which they regarded as complementing the Pax Britannica and as more effective in transforming Gujarati society during the first quarter of the nineteenth century.

=== Relations with local Kathi rulers ===
Swaminarayan maintained a close relationship with the Kathi rulers of Kathiawad, earning him the title "Kathiya Bhagwan" (the god revered by Kathis) due to his adoption of their attire, dialect, and customs. The Kathis served as key allies, offering him protection against opposition from local religious figures. Manilal Bhalaja observes that the Kathis left their homes to safeguard Swaminarayan. Additionally, they provided him with refuge during a period of concealment. The Kathis also played a significant role in resolving conflicts during Swaminarayan's temple construction, often facing interference from princely states. A notable instance occurred when Voldan Dhadhal, a Kathi chieftain of Refada, intervened to counter opposition from Thakor Wajesinhji, the ruler of Bhavnagar state, ensuring the successful completion of Gopinathji Mandir of Gadhada.

=== Temples and ascetics ===
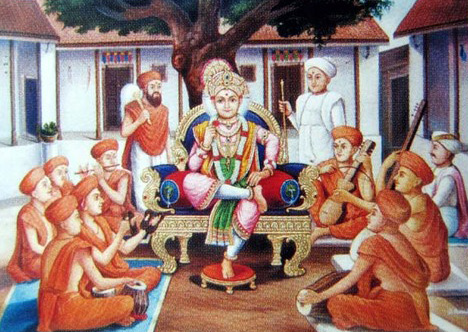
Swaminarayan and the Paramahamsas in Gadhada

Swaminarayan oversaw the construction of six temples and installed the idols of various deities such as Radha Krishna, Nara-Narayana, Laksmi Narayana, Gopinath, Radha Ramana, and Madanamohana. The images in the temples built by Swaminarayan provide evidence of the priority of Krishna. Disciples of Swaminarayan composed devotional poems which are widely sung by the tradition during festivals. Swaminarayan introduced fasting and devotion among followers. He conducted the festivals of Vasant Panchami, Holi, and Janmashtami with organization of the traditional folk dance raas.

The first temple Swaminarayan constructed was in Ahmedabad in 1822, with the land for construction given by the Company Government. Following a request of devotees from Bhuj, Swaminarayan asked his follower Vaishnavananand to build a temple there. Construction commenced in 1822, and the temple was built within a year. A temple in Vadtal followed in 1824, a temple in Dholera in 1826, a temple in Junagadh in 1828 and a temple in Gadhada, also in 1828. By the time of his death, Swaminarayan had also ordered construction of temples in Muli, Dholka and Jetalpur.

From early on, ascetics have played a major role in the Swaminarayan sect. They contribute towards growth and development of the movement, encouraging people to follow a pious and religious life. Tradition maintains that Swaminarayan initiated 500 ascetics as paramahamsas in a single night. Paramahamsa is a title of honour sometimes applied to Hindu spiritual teachers who are regarded as having attained enlightenment. Paramahamsas were the highest order of sannyasi in the sect. Prominent paramahamsas included Muktanand Swami, Gopalanand Swami, Brahmanand Swami, Gunatitanand Swami, Premanand Swami, Nishkulanand Swami, and Nityanand Swami.

=== Ahmedabad and Vadtal Gadi ===
Prior to his death, Swaminarayan decided to establish a line of acharyas or preceptors, as his successors. He established two gadis (seats of leadership). One seat was established at Ahmedabad (Nar Narayan Dev Gadi) and the other one at Vadtal (Laxmi Narayan Dev Gadi) on 21 November 1825. Swaminarayan appointed an acharya to each of these gadis to pass on his message to others and to preserve his fellowship, the Swaminarayan Sampradaya. These acharyas came from his immediate family after sending representatives to search them out in Uttar Pradesh. He formally adopted a son each from his two brothers and appointed them to the office of acharya. Ayodhyaprasad, the son of Swaminarayan's elder brother Rampratap, and Raghuvira, the son of his younger brother Ichcharam, were appointed acharyas of the Ahmedabad Gadi and the Vadtal (Kheda district) Gadi respectively. Swaminarayan decreed that the office should be hereditary so that acharyas would maintain a direct line of blood descent from his family. The administrative division of his followers into two territorial dioceses is set forth in minute detail in a document written by Swaminarayan called Desh Vibhag Lekh. Swaminarayan stated to all the devotees and saints to obey both the Acharyas and Gopalanand Swami who was considered as the main pillar and chief ascetic for the sampradaya.

The current acharya of the Ahmedabad Gadi is Koshalendraprasad Pande and Ajendraprasad Pande, of the Vadtal Gadi.

=== Death ===
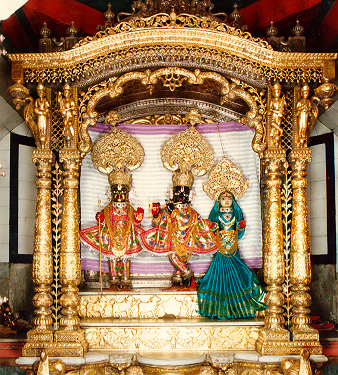
Madan Mohan and Radha (centre and right) with Swaminarayan in the form of Hari Krishna (left), installed by Swaminarayan on the central altar in Dholera (1826)

In 1830, Swaminarayan gathered his followers and announced his departure. He later died on 1 June 1830 (Jeth sud 10, Samvat 1886), and it is believed by followers that, at the time of his death, Swaminarayan left Earth for Akshardham, his abode. He was cremated according to Hindu rites at Lakshmi Wadi in Gadhada.

== Social views ==
=== Women ===
Swaminarayan insisted that education was the inherent right of all people, including women, despite considerable criticism from those in his own contemporary society who "loathed the uplift of lower caste women". At that time, influential and wealthy individuals educated their girls through private and personal tuition. Male followers of Swaminarayan made arrangements to educate their female family members. The literacy rate among females began to increase during Swaminarayan's time, and they were able to give discourses on spiritual subjects. Members of the sect consider Swaminarayan a pioneer of education of females in India.

According to the author Raymond Brady Williams, "Swaminarayan is an early representative of the practice of advocacy of women's rights without personal involvement with women". To counter the practice of sati (self-immolation by a widow on her husband's funeral pyre), Swaminarayan argued that, as human life was given by God, it could be taken only by God, and that sati had no Vedic sanction. He went to the extent to call sati nothing but suicide. Swaminarayan offered parents help with dowry expenses to discourage female infanticide, calling infanticide a sin. For calling a halt to these prevailing practices, Swaminarayan's "contemporaries naturally saw in him a pioneer of a reformed and purified Hinduism, and Swaminarayan Hinduism an 'ingrazi dharma' or British religion."

Historian David Hardiman writes that Swaminarayan "criticized the popular shakta cults and ‘gosai’ and ‘nath’ ascetics for the contemptuous and instrumental way in which they viewed and treated women". Hardiman states that these groups were "often responsible for gross sexual abuse of women". Hardiman nevertheless argues that Swaminarayan "was not free from such misogyny, though with him it came out in a different way", citing his teachings concerning women as sources of sexual temptation and his strict separation of the sexes. Swaminarayan "forbade all sadhus and sadhvis (that is, male and female ascetics) of his sect from having any contact whatsoever with members of the opposite sex." This strict precept was one he likely internalized "after travelling as an ascetic throughout India [when] he was reported to vomit if approached by even the shadow of a woman". To help his male ascetic followers maintain their vow of celibacy, Swaminarayan taught "the woman who attracts attention is made up of bones, blood vessels, spittle, blood, mucus and feces; she is simply a collection of these things, and there is nothing to be attractive".

Williams writes that members are "somewhat defensive" about practices that appear to restrict women’s freedom and make full equality in leadership impossible. Female devotees are permitted only in sections of temples reserved for women or attend separate women’s temples. Concepts of ritual pollution associated with menstruation can restrict women’s participation in temple worship, including exclusion from temples during menstruation. Swaminarayan also directed male devotees not to listen to religious discourses given by women.

In the case of widows, Swaminarayan directed those who could not follow the path of chastity to remarry. For those who could, he lay down strict rules which included them being under the control of male members of the family. Williams describes these regulations as restrictive by contemporary standards, while arguing that they provided widows with "a respected and secure place in the social order" at the time. Swaminarayan restricted widows "to live always under the control of male members of their family and prohibited them from receiving instruction in any science from any man excepting their nearest relations."

=== Caste system and the poor ===
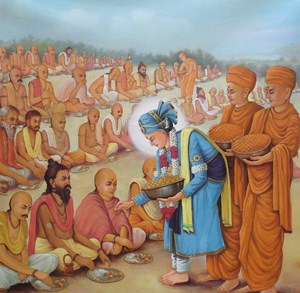
Swaminarayan distributing food among the needy

Swaminarayan organised his ascetics for social welfare work, including digging and repairing wells and reservoirs. During times of famine and plague, they opened kitchens to feed the destitute; during the 1813–14 famine in Kathiawar, he sent ascetics to central Gujarat to collect food grain for relief efforts.

Scholars have differed in their assessments of Swaminarayan’s approach to caste. Martha Nussbaum describes him as progressive on caste while noting that he did not reject the caste system entirely, whereas C. J. Fuller characterizes the Swaminarayan order as predominantly conservative in relation to caste. He did not reject caste-based restrictions concerning eating with or accepting food from members of lower castes. A political officer in Gujarat, Mr. Williamson reported to Bishop Reginald Heber that Swaminarayan had "destroyed the yoke of caste." He instructed his paramahamsas to collect alms from all sections of society and appointed people from the lower strata of society as his personal attendants. Members of the lower castes were attracted to the movement as it improved their social status. Swaminarayan would eat along with the lower Rajput and Khati castes but not any lower. Dalits were formally excluded from Swaminarayan temples, although a separate temple was established for them at Chhani near Baroda. Members of a lower caste are prohibited from wearing a full sect mark (tilak chandlo) on their forehead. In 2010, sociologist A. M. Shah wrote that for much of Gujarat’s lower-caste, Dalit and tribal population, the sect remained "out of bounds".

Reginald Heber, the Lord Bishop of Calcutta, noted that disciples of Swaminarayan cut across all castes, and even included Muslims. He writes "they all pray to one God with no difference of castes. They live as if they were brothers." Furthermore, in a meeting with Swaminarayan, he noted that "[Swaminarayan] did not regard the subject as of much importance, but that he wished not to give offense (to ancient Hindu system); that people might eat separately or together in this world, but that above "oopur" pointing to heaven, those distinctions would cease." Williams describes Swaminarayan’s approach as reflecting a tension between traditional caste restrictions and the movement’s ideal of religious brotherhood. He taught that the soul is neither male nor female, nor yoked to any specific caste.

=== Animal sacrifices and yajnas ===
Swaminarayan opposed animal sacrifices. Swaminarayan conducted several large-scale yajnas involving priests from Varanasi. Swaminarayan promoted ahimsa through bloodless yajnas and teachings against animal sacrifice. Swaminarayan stressed lacto vegetarianism among his followers and forbade meat consumption, codifying the conduct in the Shikshapatri.

== Scriptures ==
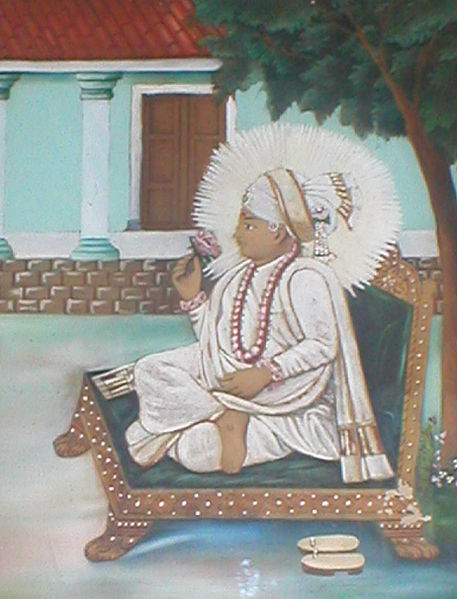
Swaminarayan under a Neem tree in Gadhada

Swaminarayan propagated general Hindu texts. He held the Bhagavata Purana in high authority. However, there are many texts that were written by Swaminarayan or his followers that are regarded as shastras or scriptures within the Swaminarayan sect. Notable scriptures throughout the sect include the Shikshapatri and the Vachanamrut. Other important works and scriptures include the Satsangi Jeevan, Swaminarayan's authorized biography, the Muktanand Kavya, the Nishkulanand Kavya and the Bhakta Chintamani.

=== Shikshapatri ===
Swaminarayan wrote the Shikshapatri on 11 February 1826. While the original Sanskrit manuscript is not available, it was translated into Gujarati by Nityanand Swami under the direction of Swaminarayan and is revered in the sect. The Gazetteer of the Bombay Presidency summarised it as a book of social laws that his followers should follow. A commentary on the practice and understanding of dharma, it is a small booklet containing 212 Sanskrit verses, outlining the basic tenets that Swaminarayan believed his followers should uphold in order to live a well-disciplined and moral life. The oldest copy of this text is preserved at the Bodleian Library of Oxford University and it is one of the very few presented by Sahajanand Swami himself. Acharya Tejendraprasad of Ahmedabad has indicated in a letter that he is not aware of any copy from the hand of Sahajanand older than this text. Swaminarayan in various places of Shikshapatri describes Krishna as the greatest entity.

=== Vachanamrut ===
The Vachanamrut (IAST: Vacanāmṛta, lit. "immortalising ambrosia in the form of words") is a sacred Hindu text consisting of 273 religious discourses delivered by Swaminarayan from 1819 to 1829 CE and is considered the principal theological text within the Swaminarayan Sampradaya. Compiled by four of his senior disciples, Swaminarayan edited and approved the scripture. As followers believe Swaminarayan to be Parabrahman, or God, the Vachanamrut is considered a direct revelation from God and thus the most precise interpretation of the Upanishads, Bhagavad Gita, and other important Hindu scriptures. This scripture is read by followers regularly and discourses are conducted daily in Swaminarayan temples around the world.

=== Satsangi Jeevan ===
Satsangi Jeevan is the authorised biography of Swaminarayan. The book contains information on the life and teachings of Swaminarayan. It is written by Shatanand Swami and completed in Vikram Samvat 1885. Swaminarayan decided to make Gadhada his permanent residence on the insistence of Dada Khachar and his sisters. Swaminarayan instructed Shatanand Swami to write a book on his life and pastimes.

According to the Satsangi Jeevan, Swaminarayan granted Shatanand Swami Sanjay Drishti, described in the text as the ability to perceive events from Swaminarayan’s past. According to the same account, Swaminarayan reviewed the completed work and instructed his disciples to recite it.

== Legacy ==
=== Schisms ===
Decades after his death, several divisions occurred with different understandings of succession. This included the establishment of Bochasanwasi Shri Akshar Purushottam Swaminarayan Sanstha (BAPS), the founder of which left the Vadtal Gadi in 1905, and Maninagar Swaminarayan Gadi Sansthan, the founder of which left the Ahmedabad Gadi in the 1940s. The followers of BAPS hold Gunatitanand Swami as the spiritual successor to Swaminarayan, asserting that on several occasions Swaminarayan revealed to devotees that Gunatitanand Swami was Aksharbrahm manifest. Followers of BAPS believe that the acharyas were given administrative leadership of the sect while Gunatitanand Swami was given spiritual leadership by Swaminarayan. The current spiritual and administrative leader of BAPS is Mahant Swami Maharaj. The followers of the Maninagar Swaminarayan Gadi Sansthan hold Gopalanand Swami as the successor to Swaminarayan. The current leader of this sect is Jitendriyapriyadasji Maharaj.

=== Growth ===
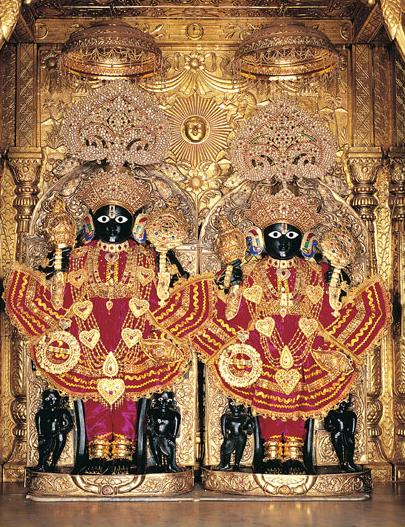
Nara Narayana installed by Swaminarayan in the first Swaminarayan Temple, Ahmedabad.

According to the biographer Raymond Williams, when Swaminarayan died, he had a following of 1.8 million people. In 2001, Swaminarayan centres existed on four continents, and the congregation was recorded to be five million, the majority in the homeland of Gujarat. The newspaper Indian Express estimated members of the Swaminarayan sect of Hinduism to number over 20 million (2 crore) worldwide in 2007.

=== Reception ===
The manifestation belief and Swaminarayan's teachings were criticized by Hindu reformist leader Dayananda Saraswati (1824–1883). He questioned the acceptance of Swaminarayan as the Supreme Being and was disapproving towards the idea that visions of Swaminarayan could form a path to attaining perfection. Dayananda Saraswati accused Swaminarayan’s followers of illegally obtaining wealth and practising "frauds and tricks", and alleged that Sahajanand had dressed as Narayana to gain disciples. Folklorist Kirin Narayan discusses these claims in the context of Dayananda’s polemics against rival religious movements.

In 1918, Mahatma Gandhi in the letter to his nephew, expressed that Swaminarayan's values didn't align perfectly with his interpretation of Vaishnavism and the love taught by Swaminarayana was all about sentimentalism. According to Gandhi, Swaminarayan had not grasped the essence of non-violence. In 1924, Gandhi applauded efforts of Swaminaryan and added that "what was accomplished in Gujarat by one person, Sahajanand [Swaminarayan], could not be accomplished by the power of the State".

== See also ==
- Akshar-Purushottam Darshan

== Sources ==
Printed sources

- Hatcher, Brian (2020). Hinduism before reform. Cambridge, Massachusetts: Harvard University Press. ISBN 978-0-674-24713-0. OCLC 1138500516.
- Jones, Lindsay (2005). Encyclopedia of Religion. Farmington Hills: Thomson Gale. ISBN 978-0-02-865984-8.
- Kim, Hanna (19 February 2010). "Public Engagement and Personal Desires: BAPS Swaminarayan Temples and their Contribution to the Discourses on Religion". International Journal of Hindu Studies. 13 (3): 357–390. doi:10.1007/s11407-010-9081-4. ISSN 1022-4556. S2CID 4980801.
- Mangalnidhidas, Sadhu (April 2016). Sahajanand Swami's Approach to Caste. Oxford University Press. pp. 115–128. doi:10.1093/acprof:oso/9780199463749.003.0007. ISBN 9780199086573.
- Olson, Carl Olson (2007). The many colors of Hinduism: a thematic-historical introduction. Rutgers University Press. p. 336. ISBN 978-0-8135-4068-9.
- Paramtattvadas, Sadhu; Williams, Raymond Brady; Amrutvijaydas, Sadhu (April 2016). Swaminarayan and British Contacts in Gujarat in the 1820s. Oxford University Press. pp. 58–93. doi:10.1093/acprof:oso/9780199463749.003.0005. ISBN 9780199086573.
- Paramtattvadas, Swami (2017). An introduction to Swaminarayan Hindu theology. Cambridge, United Kingdom: Cambridge University Press. ISBN 978-1-107-15867-2. OCLC 964861190.
- Parikh, Vibhuti (April 2016). "The Swaminarayan Ideology and Kolis in Gujarat". Swaminarayan Hinduism. Oxford University Press. pp. 94–114. doi:10.1093/acprof:oso/9780199463749.003.0006. ISBN 9780199086573.
- Patel, Shruti (2017). "Beyond the Lens of Reform: Religious Culture in Modern Gujarat". The Journal of Hindu Studies. 10: 47–85. doi:10.1093/jhs/hix005.
- Raval, Suresh (2012). Renunciation, Reform and Women in Swaminarayan Hinduism. Ahmedabad, Gujarat, India: Shahibaug Swaminarayan Aksharpith.
- Schreiner, Peter (2001), "Institutionalization of Charisma: The Case of Sahajananda", in Dalmia, Vasudha; Malinar, Angelika; Christof, Martin (eds.), Charisma and canon : Essays on the Religious History of the Indian Subcontinent, Oxford University Press
- Trivedi (2015). Bhagwan Swaminarayan: the story of his life (2nd ed.). Ahmedabad: Swaminarayan Aksharpith. ISBN 978-81-7526-594-3. OCLC 957581656.
- Williams, Raymond (2001). Introduction to Swaminarayan Hinduism. Cambridge University Press. ISBN 978-0-521-65422-7.
- Williams, Raymond (2004). Williams on South Asian Religions and Immigration: Collected Works. Ashgate Publishing Ltd. ISBN 978-0-7546-3856-8.
- Williams, Raymond Brady (2018). An introduction to Swaminarayan Hinduism (Third ed.). Cambridge, United Kingdom: Cambridge University Press. ISBN 978-1-108-42114-0. OCLC 1038043717.

Web-sources
