= Gopalanand Swami =

Hindu spiritual teacher

Personal life
- Born: Khushal Bhatt; 1 February 1781 Torda, Idar state (present day, Gujarat)
- Died: 21 April 1852 (aged 70) Vadtal, Gujarat (present-day Gujarat, India)
- Notable work: Gopalanand Swamini Vato

Religious life
- Religion: Hinduism

Religious career
- Teacher: Swaminarayan
- Disciples: Nirgundasji Swami

Gopalanand Swami (1781–1852) was a paramhansa of the Swaminarayan Sampradaya who was ordained by Swaminarayan. He worked and guided many followers to spread the Swaminarayan Sampradaya. The Swaminarayan Sampradaya believes that Gopalanand Swami is regarded as one of the yogis who attained the positions of Ashthangyog or the 8 fold paths in the field of sacred yog. It is also believed that Gopalanand Swami was appointed as the head of both Vadtal and Amdavaad Desh.

== Biography ==
Born as Khushal Bhatt, he was born in the Arvalli District's, Torda Village of Idar, Sabarkantha, Gujarat. His father was an audichiya brahmin, Motiram Bhatt and his mother was Jiveeba Bhatt. Gopalanand Swami pursued deep study and showed great interest of grammar, Indian philosophy of Nyaya and Vedanta. Gopalanand Swami was a scholar, with knowledge in Vyakaran (grammar), Nyaya, Mimasa, astrology. He was married to Adityabai and had two children Harisankar and Anupamba though he felt no attachment. Swaminarayan gave diksha (the becoming of a saint in which vows such as celibacy and renunciation of all personal possessions and of all worldly duties, including family ties are taken) to Gopalanand Swami in Akshar ordi(Gadhada), Gujarat. Swaminarayan held Gopalanand Swami in very high regard and he was very learned in Ashtang yoga. Gopalanand Swami Returned to Akshardham in 1852 at place Vadtal.

== Responsibility of the Swaminarayan Sampradaya ==
When Swaminarayan returned to his abode (1 June 1830), he left responsibility of the Swaminarayan Sampradaya and the Acharyas in his hands and he looked after the satsang after Swaminarayan went to Akshardham.

== Sarangpur temple ==
Gopalanand Swami arranged for an idol of Kashtabhanjan Dev Hanumanji to be installed in the Sarangpur temple which is said to have come alive and moved when installed by him. Gopalanand Swami touched the murti with a rod and the murti came alive and moved.

== Works ==
=== Sanskrit Books ===
- Vivekdeep
- Vishnuyaag Paddhati
- Pujavidhi
- Bhakti Siddhi
- Haribhakta Namavali
- Brahmasutrarthdeep
- Ishadi Upanishad Bhashya
- Shreemad Bhagwad Geeta Bhashya
- Commentary on Second Canto of Shreemad Bhagwat (Sukabhipray Bodhini Tika)
- Dasham Skandh Goodharth Bodhini Tika
- Ekadash Skandh Krushnabhipray Bodhini Tika
- Ved Stuti Shrutyarth Bodhini Tika and Anvayarth Bodhini Tika
- Shandilya Sutra Bhakti Prakashika Tika etc.

=== Vernacular Books ===
- Varta Vivek
- Advait Khandan
- Marathi Translation of Shikshapatri
- Updeshi Vartao
- Puja Paddhati na Pana
- Bhaktisiddhi Bhashantar (Translation of Bhaktisiddhi)
- Sampraday Pradeep
