= Muli, Gujarat =

Muli
- Village
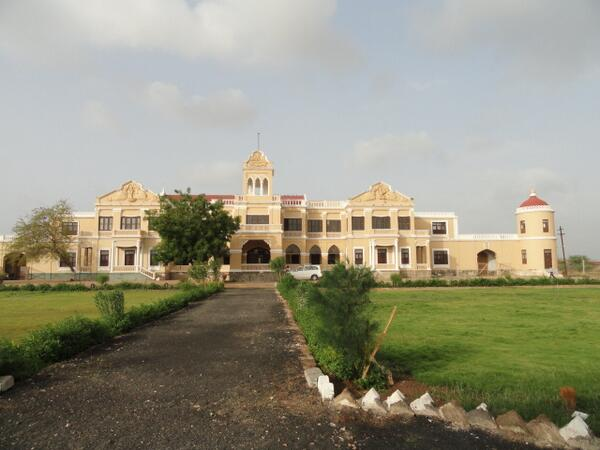
- Ambika Nivas Palace

- Location in Gujarat, India Muli (India)
- Coordinates: 22.638808°N 71.458039°E
- Country: India
- State: Gujarat
- District: Surendranagar

Population
  - Total: 9,191

Languages
  - Official: Gujarati, Hindi
- Time zone: UTC+5:30 (IST)
- Telephone code: 02756
- Vehicle registration: GJ 13
- Climate: Dry (Köppen)
- Website: gujaratindia.com

Muli is a large village located 21 km (13 miles) southwest of the district capital of Surendranagar, Gujarat, India, by the Bhogavo River.

== History ==
Muli is a town as well as a subdivision (called taluka) that falls in Surendranagar district in the Saurashtra region of Indian Gujarat. While Muli town has a population of 9,191, the Muli subdivision (taluka) has 58 inhabited villages with a population of 118,902. The name "Muli" may also refer to an erstwhile Muli Princely state of the same name.

== Battle over a partridge ==
Muli is famous for a battle over a wounded partridge. Stone Memorials at Muli commemorate the event when two communities fought over a partridge leading to the death of an estimated 640 persons. The incident goes back to 1474, when members of the Chabad community, who were tribal hunters shot a partridge, which was wounded and saved by the King mother of the Parmar dynasty of Muli state. The King mother named Jombai, mother of Lakhdhirji, the king of the Sodha Parmar Rajputs found the injured bird lying behind the presiding deity of their community, and hence refused to hand over the bird. The ensuring battle led to many deaths and stone memorials are still found in Muli. The caste identity of each of those killed in inscribed in the memorials. Since then, Parmar community of Muli vowed never to kill a partridge.
