= Akshar =

Akshar may refer to:

- Akshara, a Sanskrit term meaning "undestroyable," "letter"
  - Sanskrit alphabet
  - Akshar (Swaminarayan), philosophical concept in the Swaminarayan sect of Hinduism
    - Aksharbrahman, ultimate reality in the Swaminarayan sect
    - Akshar Deri, Swaminarayan pilgrimage site in Gondal, Gujarat, India
  - Akshara Brahma Yoga, eighth chapter of the Bhagavad Gita
  - Akshara abyasam, learning the alphbet in Hinduism
- Akshara (film), a 2021 Indian film by B. Chinni Krishna
- Akshar School, a private school in Kolkata, West Bengal, India
- Akshar Kothari, an Indian actor
- Axar Patel (born 1994), an Indian cricketer

== See also ==
- Aksharathettu (disambiguation)
- Akshara Gowda (born 1991), an Indian actress
- Akshara Haasan (born 1991), an Indian actress, daughter of Kamal Haasan
- Akshara Kishor (born 2008), an Indian child actress
- Akshara Maheshwari Singhania, a fictional character portrayed by Hina Khan from the Indian sopa opera Yeh Rishta Kya Kehlata Hai
- Akshara Singh, an Indian actress
- Aksharapalli, an alphasyllabic numeration scheme used in ancient Indian manuscripts
- Aksharam, a 1995 Indian Malayalam-language film by Sibi Malayil
- Aksharangal, a 1984 Indian film
