= Anadi Muktaraj Shri Abjibapa =

Spirituality teacher from Kutch region of India

Jivanpran Abjibapashri
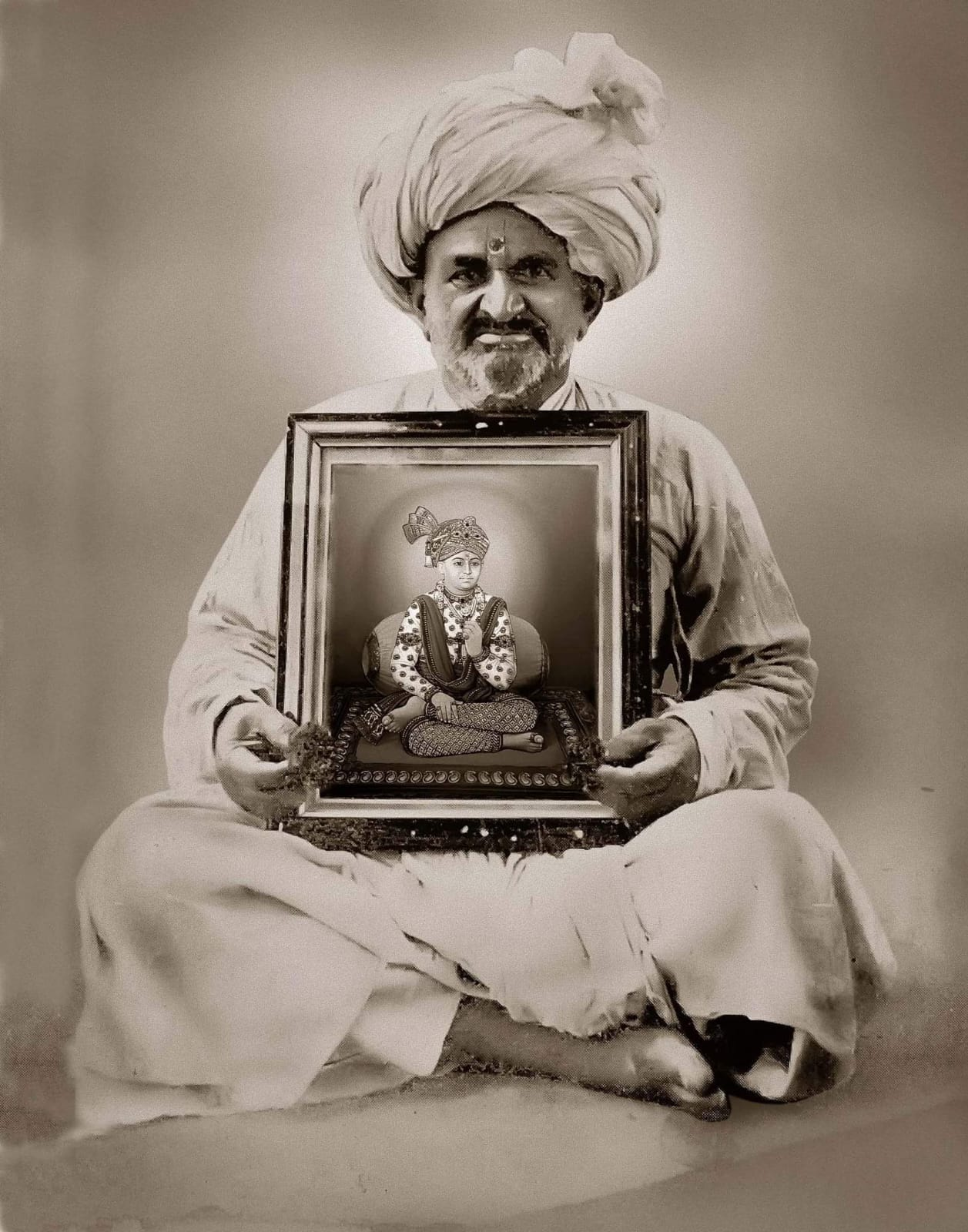
- Jivanpran Abjibapashri
- Preceded by: Sadguru Nirgunjivandasji swami
- Succeeded by: Sadguru Iswarcharandasji swami

Personal life
- Born: 20 November 1844 Baladiya, Gujarat, India
- Died: 23 June 1928 (aged 83) Baladiya, Gujarat, India

Religious life
- Religion: Hinduism
- Denomination: Swaminarayan Sampradaya, SMVS
- Philosophy: Sanatan Swaminarayan Upasna

Anadi Muktaraj Shri Abjibapa (20 November 1844 – 23 June 1928) also known as Bapashri or Abjibapashri, was a householder devotee, saint, mystic, Indian philosopher and theologian who expounded on metaphysics and teachings of Lord Swaminarayan. His most notable work is a treatise of explanations of inner meanings of Vachanamrutam (spiritual discourses of Lord Swaminarayan) called "Rahasyartha Pradipika Tika". He is also accredited with a few other texts which are mostly transcripts of his talks and sermons and also with the revival of a meditation method called Pratilom Dhyana. A Chattri was erected in Baladia village of kutch region of Gujarat state to commemorate his life and contribution to spirituality called "Shri Abjibapani Chhatedi". There is also a street named in his honour in the Ahmedabad City called the "Abjibapa Marg", . In his thought, Lord Swaminarayan was Purna Purushottama Narayana (Para-Brahman) who manifested Himself on this earth in human form out compassion to liberate innumerable souls by total use of his grace and freewill alone into his own state of absolute and perpetual bliss. This state of total oneness with the Supreme image of God he called dwelling in the image Murti. An individual who experienced this state he called Anadi or Kaivalya Mukta i.e. the one who is eternally liberated from samsara. While the word "murti" could ordinarily refers to idol or photograph, he used it in the special sense to indicate form or logos called svarupa in sanskrit.

== Ontological Context and Manifestation ==
Within Swaminarayan theological tradition, the manifestation of Abji Bapashri is understood in relation to the soteriological vision of Lord Swaminarayan. Lord Swaminarayan established a religious movement centered on moral discipline, social reform, and devotional practice.

According to tradition, he stated that his spiritual mission would continue for 125 years beyond his physical presence. After his death in 1830, this continuity is believed to have been maintained through a lineage of spiritually realized figures known as Satpurushes. Some Swaminarayan traditions hold that a manifestation of the Lord’s resolve was anticipated fifteen years after his departure, a role attributed by followers to Abjibapashri.
