= Jnana-Vijnana Yoga =

Chapter 7 of the Bhagavad Gita

- ← Atma-Samyama Yoga Akshara Brahma Yoga →
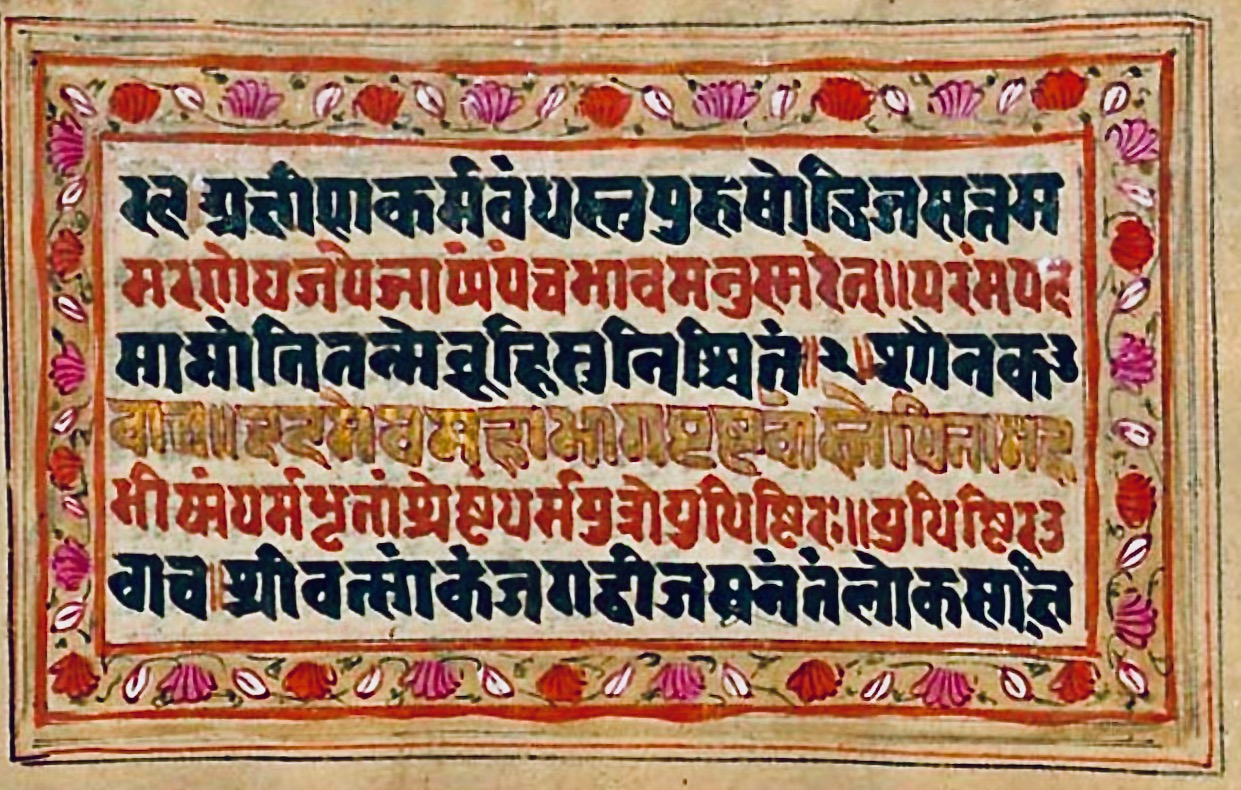
- 1800 CE manuscript copy, 2nd century BCE Bhagvad Gita, Schoyen Collection Norway

Information
- Religion: Hinduism
- Author: Traditionally attributed to Vyasa
- Language: Sanskrit
- Verses: 30

The Jnana-Vijnana Yoga (Sanskrit: ज्ञानविज्ञानयोग, romanized: Jñānavijñānayōga) is the seventh of the eighteen chapters of the Bhagavad Gita. The chapter has a total of thirty shlokas. it is the 29th chapter of Bhishma Parva, the sixth book of the Mahabharata.
