= Aksharathettu =

Aksharathettu (lit. 'Alphabet') may refer to:

- Aksharathettu (film), a 1989 Indian Malayalam-language film
- Aksharathettu (TV series), an Indian Malayalam television series

== See also ==
- Akshar (disambiguation)
