= Akshar Purushottam Darshan =

Set of spiritual beliefs based on the teachings of Swaminarayan

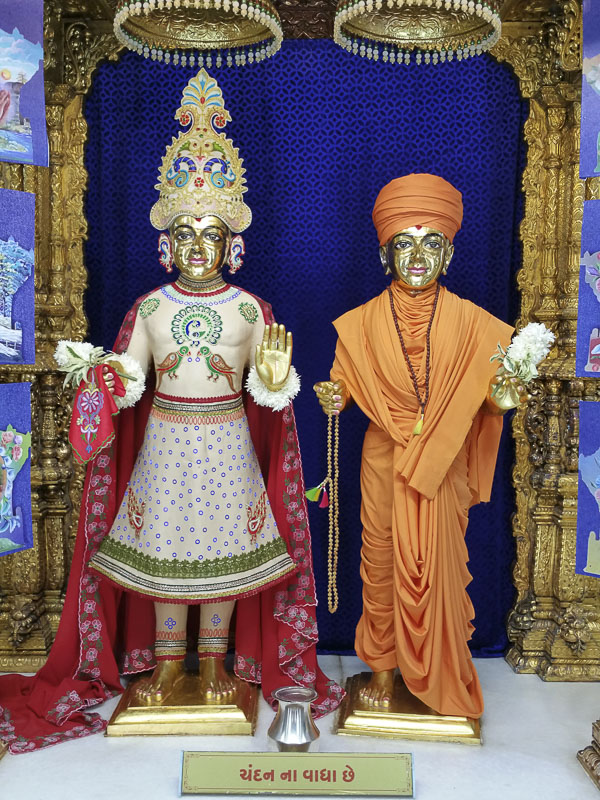
Bhagwan Swaminarayan and Gunatitanand Swami at BAPS Mandir

Akshar-Purushottam Darshan (Akṣara-Puruṣottama Darśana (Note: BAPS Swaminarayan Research Institute, HH Mahant Swami Maharaj Inaugurates the Svāminārāyaṇasiddhāntasudhā and Announces Parabrahman Svāminārāyaṇa's Darśana as the Akṣara-Puruṣottama Darśana)) or Aksarabrahma-Parabrahma-Darsanam, "Akshar-Purushottam philosophy", is a designation used by BAPS as an alternative name for the Swaminarayan Darshana, Swaminarayan's view or teachings, to distinguish it from other Vedanta-traditions. It is based on Swaminarayan's distinction between Parabrahman (Purushottam, Narayana) and Aksharbrahman as two distinct eternal realities, which in this view sets Swaminarayan's teachings apart from other Vedanta-traditions. (Note: 17th World Sanskrit Conference Recognizes Bhagwan Swaminarayan's Akshar-Purushottam Darshan as a Distinct Vedanta Tradition) It is an essential element for the BAPS and its Akṣara-Puruṣottama Upāsanā ("worship"), (Note: Swaminarayan sanshta, Worship of God with the Guru - Akshar Purushottam Philosophy) (Note: Parabrahman Swaminarayan's Akshar-Purushotam Darshan: An Introduction) in which Purushottam c.q. Parabrahman is present in a lineage of Aksharbrahman guru's, who are the abode (akshar) of God.

== Meaning ==
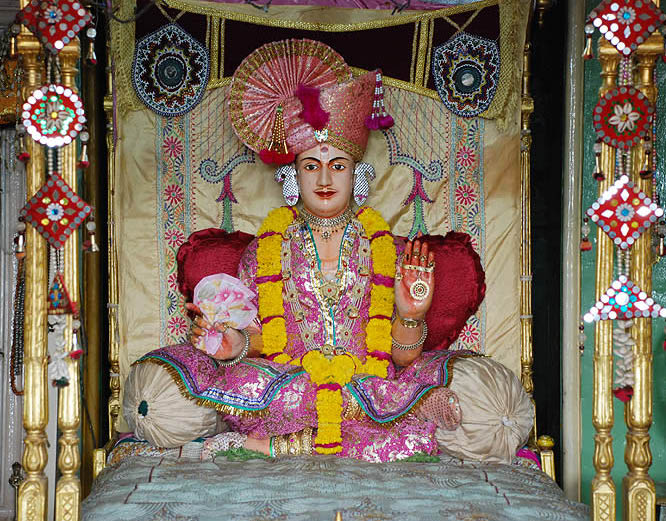
Swaminarayan in Akshar Bhuvan at the Swaminarayan Temple in Vadtal

In Swaminarayan theology, a distinction is made between Para Brahman, the highest Brahman which is Purushottam Narayan (God), who is regarded by his followers to be manifest in Swaminarayan, and Akshar Brahman, the "fundamental principle of the cosmic order" but also the abode of God. The Ahmedabad and Vadtal dioceses, the original Swaminarayan Sampraday, regard Akshar to be the transcendental abode of Purushottam where he is always manifest.

The BAPS, as specified in their Akṣara-Puruṣottama Upāsanā, regards Akshar also to always manifest on earth in a personal form, as a guru and ideal devotee who accompanies Purushottam, and in which Purushottam resides and is to be worshipped. They regard Gunatitanand Swami and his successors to be this abode of Purushottam. The idea that Swaminarayan had appointed Gunatitanand as his spiritual successor, instead of the two acharyas, was for the sadhus of the Vadtal diocese a heretical teaching, and they "refused to worship what they considered to be a human being."

Adherents believe that they can achieve moksha, or freedom from the cycle of birth and death, by becoming aksharrup (or brahmarup), that is, by attaining qualities similar to Akshar (or Aksharbrahman) and worshipping Purushottam (or Parabrahman; the supreme living entity; God).

== Sources ==
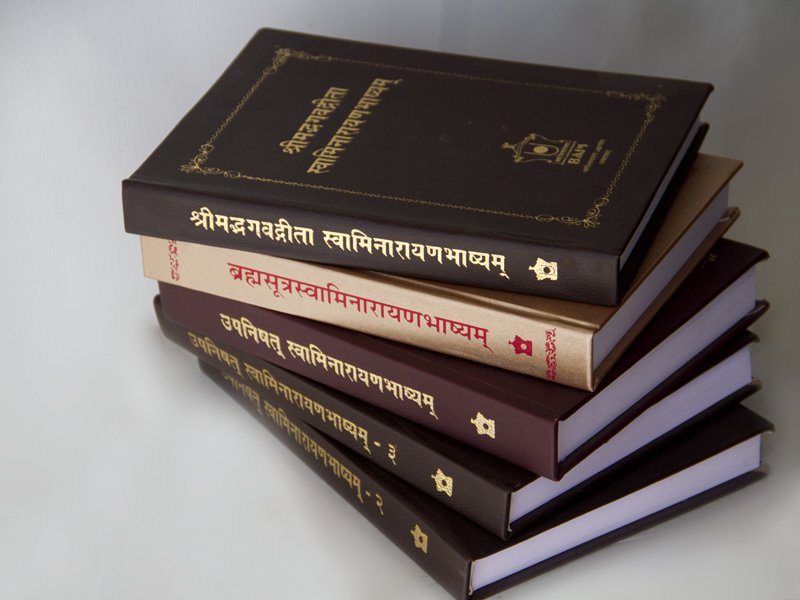
Swaminarayan Bhashyam

The primary sources of Akshar-Purushottam Darshan are the Vachanamrut, which is a compilation of 273 oral discourses delivered by Swaminarayan that were documented by his senior followers during his lifetime; the Vedaras, a comprehensive letter written to his monastic followers explicating his doctrine and providing moral instructions; and the Swamini Vato, a collection of oral commentaries delivered by Gunatitanand Swami, who was Swaminarayan's senior disciple and regarded as his successor as guru in the lineage of the Bochasanwasi Akshar Purushottam Sanstha (BAPS).

For the BAPS, other sources clarifying Akshar-Purushottam Darshan include Bhagatji Maharaj, Shastriji Maharaj, Yogiji Maharaj, and Pramukh Swami Maharaj, who in order were successors to Gunatitanand Swami as Guru in the BAPS Swaminarayan tradition, and Mahant Swami Maharaj, the current Guru. The followers of BAPS lay particular emphasis on the creedal statement written by Pramukh Swami Maharaj, titled Swaminarayan Darshanna Siddhantono Alekh, which summarises their view on Swaminarayan's teachings. According to the Swaminarayan Aksharpith, the BAPS publisher, "Shastriji Maharaj identified [Swaminarayan's] darshan as 'Akshar-Purushottam' [...] Shastriji Maharaj propagated this darshan by using terms such as 'Akshar-Purushottam Upasana' and 'Akshar-Purushottam Siddhant.'"

The Swaminarayan Bhashyam is a published commentary written by Bhadreshdas Swami in 2007 that explicates the roots of Akshar-Purushottam Darshan in the Upanishads, the Bhagavad Gita, and the Brahma Sutras. This is further corroborated in a classical Sanskrit treatise, also authored by Bhadreshdas Swami, called Swaminarayan-Siddhanta-Sudha. Bhadreshdas (2016) argues that the Akshar-Purushottam disntinction is a characteristic marker which "identifies" Swaminarayan's teachings, and that the term Akshar-Purushottam Darshan can be used as a designation for Swaminarayan's teachings.

== Five eternal realities ==
Swaminarayan stated that five entities are eternal, as stated in two of his sermons documented in the Vachanamrut, Gadhada 1.7 and Gadhada 3.10:

"Puruṣottama Bhagavān, Akṣarabrahman, māyā, īśvara and jīva – these five entities are eternal."
"From all the Vedas, Purāṇas, Itihāsa and Smṛti scriptures, I have gleaned the principle that jīva, māyā, īśvara, Brahman and Parameśvara are all eternal."

BAPS-theologian Paramtattvadas (2017) further elaborates on these five eternal realities:

=== Purushottam ===
Purushottam, God (literally 'supreme being') is interchangeably referred to as Parabrahman (highest Brahman), Paramatma (supreme self) and Parameshwar (supreme ishwar). He is the supreme existential reality and highest of the five eternal entities. The nature of Purushottam in Akshar-Purushottam Darshan is conceptualised in four distinct aspects:

1. Sarvopari (supreme): Purushottam is the highest singular entity that transcends all realities. Swaminarayan taught that Purushottam is one and incomparable: "After all, there is only one form of God. This God is extremely powerful and no one, including Akshar, is capable of becoming like him. This is an established principle." (Vachanamrut, Loya 4)
2. Sarvakarta (all-doer): All actions in the universe ultimately depend on Purushottam, who is the final cause of all causes and the inner-controller of all entities. Even though jivas and ishwars have independent agency, no action can be performed without the support and will of Purushottam. The process of liberation entails developing this realization. Swaminarayan stated: "The jīva's liberation is attained only by the following understanding: 'All that happens is by the doing of the manifest form of [Parabrahman], but nothing at all is done by any of time kāḷa, karma, māyā, etc.' In this manner, understanding God alone to be the all-doer is indeed the supreme cause of liberation." (Vachanamrut, Kariyani 10)
3. Sakar (possessing divine form): Swaminarayan instructed his followers that Purushottam possesses a divine form. In Vachanamrut Gadhada 1.71, Swaminarayan stated: "One should never refute the form of God." This form, he taught, was human in shape, yet still divine.
4. Pragat (manifest): according to the BAPS, God is eternally present on Earth to grant moksha to spiritual seekers in human form, either directly or through the human form of Akshar. In Vachanamrut Vadtal 19, Swaminarayan stated: "Whenever a jiva attains a human body in Bharata-khanda [i.e., the Indian subcontinent], God's avatar or God's Swami [i.e. Brahmaswarup Guru] will certainly also be present on earth at that time."

=== Aksharbrahman ===
Aksharbrahman, from akshar (अक्षर, "imperishable", "unalterable"), and Brahman, is second only in transcendence to Purushottam; it is eternally above the influences of maya. Though a single entity ontologically, Akshar exists in four different forms:

1. As Purushottam's eternal transcendental abode, known as Akshardham (dham meaning abode or home): Swaminarayan states in Vachanamrut Gadhada 1.63, "Akshar is Purushottam Bhagwan's abode..." Only liberated souls, those who have acquired qualitative oneness with Akshar, can enter Akshardham. Thus, along with Purushottam, Akshardham holds the countless liberated souls, known as aksharmuktas, and Akshar in its second form (see below), who personally serves Purushottam in Akshardham. As a form of Akshar, Akshardham the abode is singular, eternal, and forever beyond maya. Swaminarayan describes its transcendental greatness, extreme radiance and supreme bliss in the Vachanamrut. Within other sacred Hindu texts, Akshardham is also referred to by terms such as 'paramadham,' 'pad,' 'parama-sthan,' 'param vyoma,' 'Brahmapur' and 'Brahmadham.'
2. As the ideal devotee of Purushottam within Akshardham: Akshar also resides in a personal form within Akshardham itself as an eternal and exemplary devotee of Purushottam. Like Purushottam, Akshar here has a human-shaped form, complete with two arms and other features. At the time of creation, Purushottam first looks towards this personified form of Akshar with the desire to initiate creation. In this way, by Purushottam's eternal wish, Akshar also becomes the cause of all creation.
3. As the Brahmaswarup Guru in human form on earth. According to the BAPS, Swaminarayan states that Purushottam manifests on earth along with Akshar (Vachanamrut Gadhada 1.71), through whom he remains completely and uninterruptedly present to continue his work of ultimate liberation and granting his devotees his own blissful experience by accepting their devotion. Gunatitanand Swami (1784–1867), Bhagatji Maharaj (1829–1897), Shastriji Maharaj (1865–1951), Yogiji Maharaj (1892–1971) and Pramukh Swami Maharaj (1921–2016) are believed to be a part of this BAPS-lineage of Brahmaswarup Gurus. Mahant Swami Maharaj (b. 1933) is the current BAPS-Guru in that lineage.
4. As Chidakash, the all-pervading, radiant consciousness: 'Chidakash' refers to an extremely radiant ('akash') sentient ('chit') entity. It pervades within and outside infinite brahmands and upholds them. In the Chhandogya Upanishad (8.1.1), this Chidakash is identified as daharākāśa. 'dahar' means subtle, and 'daharākāśa' means a subtle radiant entity. Aksharbrahma is identified as daharākāśa as it pervades and resides within the heart of every being. In Vachanamrut Gadhada 1.46, Swaminarayan identifies the knowledge of this daharākāśa as daharvidyā.

=== Distinction of Akshar (Brahman) from Purushottam (Parabrahman) ===
One of the key distinguishing factors of Akshar-Purushottam Darshan from other schools of Vedanta is the distinction of 'Akshar' (also known as Brahman and Aksharbrahman) as a specific metaphysical entity. It is thus ontologically distinct from Purushottam (also known as Parabrahman). The fifth chapter of the Prashna Upanishad explicitly delineates two 'Brahmans', a higher Brahman, i.e. Parabrahman, and a lower Brahman, i.e. Aksharbrahman. Verse 5.2 reads:

एतद्वै सत्यकाम परं चाऽपरं च ब्रह्म यदोङ्कारः ।
Satyakāma! The syllable Aum refers to the higher and lower Brahman.

Another clear indication of Akshar and Purushottam forming the crux of the highest spiritual truth, i.e. brahmavidya, can be found in the Mundaka Upanishad at 1.2.13:

येनाऽक्षरं पुरुषं वेद सत्यं प्रोवाच तां तत्त्वतो ब्रह्मविद्याम् ।
Brahmavidyā is that by which Akshar and Purush[ottam] are thoroughly known.

Akshar and Purushottam are also distinctly elucidated in the Bhagavad Gita. For example, verses 15.16 and 15.17 explain:

द्वाविमौ पुरुषौ लोके क्षरश्चाक्षर एव च ।

क्षरः सर्वाणि भूतानि कूटस्थोऽक्षर उच्यते ।।
उत्तमः पुरुषस्त्वन्यः परमात्मेत्युदाहृतः ।।
There are two types of beings within the world: 'kshar' and 'akshar'. All those bound by maya are kshar, whereas the one who is unchanging – forever beyond maya – is Akshar.

The supreme being is distinct [from kshar and Akshar]. He is called Paramatma.

Verse 15.18 further describes Purushottam as being superior to, and thus distinct from, even Akshar:

यस्मात्क्षरमतीतोऽहमक्षरादपि चोऽत्तमः ।

अतोऽस्मि लोके वेदे च प्रथितः पुरुषोत्तमः ।।

I am superior to kshar and superior to even Akshar. Thus, I am known as Purushottam within the world and the Vedas.

Swaminarayan also states in his sermon in Vachanamrut Gadhada 2.3:

Parabrahman, that is, Puruṣottama Nārāyaṇa, is distinct from Brahman and also the cause, support and inspirer of Brahman.

=== Maya ===
Maya is the only one of the five eternal realities which is insentient. It is the base substance from which the material world is formed and is characterized by the three qualities (gunas) – sattvaguna, rajoguna, and tamoguna. It also forms the ignorance of the jivas and ishwars – seen as ego, i.e. 'I-ness', and attachments, i.e. 'my-ness' – causing them to be bound in the continuous cycle of birth and death. Only Purushottam and Akshar forever transcend maya. Jivas and ishwars seeking liberation from endless transmigration can transcend it by associating with Akshar in the form of the Brahmaswarup Guru, who makes those souls brahmarup (or aksharrup), i.e. qualitatively similar to Akshar, thereby making them eligible for the highest devotion of Purushottam.

=== Ishwar ===
Ishwar refers not to God, but a finite sentient entity shrouded by maya, like a jiva, but endowed with special powers and knowledge for fulfilling various functions within a particular universe. Virat Purush, Brahmā (not to be confused with Brahman), Vishnu, and Shiva are examples of ishwars within Akshar-Purushottam Darshan. These divinities enliven disparate forces of nature, including the sun, moon, wind, etc.

=== Jiva ===
Jiva is a distinct, individual soul, i.e. a finite sentient being. Jivas are bound by maya, which hides their true self, which is characterized by eternal existence, consciousness, and bliss. There are an infinite number of jivas. They are extremely subtle, indivisible, impierceable, ageless, and immortal. While residing within the heart, a jiva pervades the entire body by its capacity to know (gnānshakti), making it animate. It is the form of knowledge (gnānswarūp) as well as the knower (gnātā). The jiva is the performer of virtuous and immoral actions (karmas) and experiences the fruits of these actions. It has been eternally bound by maya; as a result, it roams within the cycle of birth and death. Birth is when a jiva acquires a new body, and death is when it departs from its body. Just as one abandons one's old clothes and wears new ones, the jiva renounces its old body and acquires a new one.

== Swaminarayan mantra ==
The Swaminarayan Mantra (Svāmīnārāyaṇa), is a compound of two Sanskrit words: Swami (Svāmī) and Narayan (Nārāyaṇa), that is, Vishnu c.q. Purushottam. There are two main interpretations of the mantra, with the original branches believing the name refers to one entity, namely Narayan. The BAPS, but also some other, later branches, believe that Swami denotes Aksharbrahman (God's ideal devotee), namely Gunatitanand Swami, as identified by Sahajanand Swami, and Narayan denotes Parabrahman (God), a reference to Sahajanand Swami himself. The latter interpretation recalls an earlier Vaishnava tradition of the divine companionship between the perfect devotee and God (for example, Radha and Krishna or Shri and Vishnu).

According to Paramtattvadas, Pramukh Swami Maharaj summarises and clarifies Akshar-Purushottam Darshan as "not the worship of two entities – Akṣara and Puruṣottama. Rather, it means to become akṣararūpa [like Akṣara] and worship Puruṣottama, i.e. to become brahmarūpa [like Brahman] and worship Parabrahman." This meaning of Akshar-Purushottam Darshan is encapsulated in the BAPS-understanding of the 'Swaminarayan' mantra, as comprising two terms: 'Swami', which denotes Akshar, and 'Narayan', which denotes Purushottam. 'Swaminarayan' is thus synonymous with 'Akshar-Purushottam', instructing devotees to "become like 'Swami', i.e. akṣararūpa, and subserviently offer devotion and upāsanā to 'Narayan', i.e. Parabrahman Puruṣottama Nārāyaṇa."

== Recognition as distinct view within Vedanta ==
The Shri Kashi Vidvat Parishad, a scholarly council for Vedic studies and tradition in India, stated in a meeting in Varanasi on 31 July 2017 that it is "appropriate to identify Sri Svāminārāyaṇa's Vedānta by the title: Akṣarapuruṣottama Darśana," and that this siddhanta (view) is "distinct from Advaita, Viśiṣṭādvaita, and all other doctrines." They also acclaimed Bhadreshdas Swami as an acharya in line with Shankara, Ramanuja, Madhva and Vallabha. (Note: BAPS Swaminarayan Sanstha, Acclamation by th Sri Kasi Vidvat Parisad) (Note: After critically reviewing the Swaminarayan-Bhashyam and Swaminarayan-Siddhanta-Sudha, the council proclaimed in a written statement: "The Prasthānatrayī-Svāminārāyaṇabhāṣya and the Svāminārāyaṇasiddhāntasudhā are sacred texts on Parabrahman Svāminārāyaṇa's revealed Akṣarapuruṣottama Darśana. These sacred texts are in every manner the protectors of the eternal Vedic religious tradition. Acclaimed by all scholars, respected Mahāmahopādyāya Sadhu Bhadreshdas is an ācārya and a contemporary commentator in the lineage of commentators on the Prasthānatrayī. Within philosophy, just as Śrī Śaṅkara's Vedānta is identified as the Advaita Darśana, Śrī Rāmānuja's Vedānta is identified as the Viśiṣṭādvaita Darśana, Śrī Madhva's Vedānta is identified as the Dvaita Darśana, Śrī Vallabha's Vedānta is identified as the Śuddhādvaita Darśana, and others are respectively known; it is in every way appropriate to identify Sri Svāminārāyaṇa's Vedānta by the title: Akṣarapuruṣottama Darśana. Therefore, we all collectively endorse that this Akṣarapuruṣottama Siddhānta that has been revealed by Parabrahman Svāminārāyaṇa is distinct from Advaita, Viśiṣṭādvaita, and all other doctrines and is a Vedic siddhānta. Present during the proclamation were senior scholars of the council: Mahamahopadyaya Acharya Ramyatna Shukla, President of Kashi Vidvat Parishad; Mahamahopadyaya Acharaya Vashistha Tripathi, Vice-President of Kashi Vidvat Parishad and former Vice-Chancellor of Sampurnanand Sanskrit University; Mahamahopadyaya Pandit Shivji Upadhyay, General Secretary of Kashi Vidvat Parishad and former Vice-Chancellor of Sampurnanand Sanskrit University; and Acharaya Ramnarayan Dwivedi, Secretary of Kashi Vidvat Parishad. The declaration was later presented by members of the Kashi Vidvat Parishad as a copperplate inscription, in a public assembly at Swaminarayan Akshardham, Delhi, on 13 August 2017. This led to several public felicitations of the texts and Bhadreshdas Swami, including in Vadodara, Gujarat, by vice-chancellors and representatives of 27 universities, and in Bengaluru, Karnataka, by vice-chancellors of 35 universities and representatives of 5 others.)

Swaminarayan's teachings were also acclaimed as a distinct darshan (philosophy) within Vedanta by professor Ashok Aklujkar in 2018, commenting on Bhadreshdas' presentation the 17th World Sanskrit Conference. (Note: "Professor Ashok Aklujkar said [...] Just as the Kashi Vidvat Parishad acknowledged Swaminarayan Bhagwan's Akshar-Purushottam Darshan as a distinct darshan in the Vedanta tradition, we are honored to do the same from the platform of the World Sanskrit Conference [...] Professor George Cardona [said] "This is a very important classical Sanskrit commentary that very clearly and effectively explains that Akshar is distinct from Purushottam.") Paramtattvadas describes Swaminarayan's teachings as "a distinct school of thought within the larger expanse of classical Vedanta," presenting Swaminarayan's teachings as a seventh school of Vedanta.

== See also ==
- Acharya
- BAPS Swaminarayan Sanstha
- Hindu Philosophy
- Hindu Theology
- Pramukh Swami Maharaj
- Prasthantrayi
- Shastriji Maharaj
- Vedanta

== Sources ==
Printed

- Amrutvijaydas, Sadhu; Williams, Raymond Brady; Paramtattvadas, Sadhu (2016-04-01). Swaminarayan and British Contacts in Gujarat in the 1820s. Oxford University Press. doi:10.1093/acprof:oso/9780199463749.003.0005. ISBN 9780199086573.</ref>
- Bhadreshdas, Sadhu (April–June 2014). "Guru's grace empowers philosophical treatise". Hinduism Today.
- Bhadreshdas, Sadhu (2016-04-01). "Swaminarayan's Brahmajnana as Aksarabrahma-Parabrahma-Darsanam". In Williams; Yogi Trivedi (eds.). Swaminarayan Hinduism: Tradition, Adaptation, and Identity. Oxford University Press. doi:10.1093/acprof:oso/9780199463749.003.0011. ISBN 9780199086573.
- Paramtattvadas, Sadhu (17 August 2017). An introduction to Swaminarayan Hindu theology. Cambridge, United Kingdom: Cambridge University Press. ISBN 978-1-107-15867-2. OCLC 964861190.
- Paramtattvadas, Swami (October–December 2019). "Akshar-Purushottam School of Vedanta". Hinduism Today. Himalayan Academy.
- I.Patel, Iva (2018), "Swaminarayan", in Jain, Pankaj; Sherma, Rita; Khanna, Madhu (eds.), Hinduism and Tribal Religions, Encyclopedia of Indian Religions, Dordrecht: Springer Netherlands, pp. 1–6, doi:10.1007/978-94-024-1036-5_541-1, ISBN 978-94-024-1036-5
- Sahajānanda, Swami (2014). The Vachanāmrut: spiritual discourses of Bhagwān Swāminārāyan (First ed.). Ahmedabad: Bochasanvasi Shri Aksharpurushottama Sanstha. ISBN 9788175264311. OCLC 820357402.
- Trivedi, Yogi (2016-04-01). Multivalent Krishna-Bhakti in Premanand's Poetry. Oxford University Press. pp. 191–217. doi:10.1093/acprof:oso/9780199463749.003.0012. ISBN 9780199086573.
- Williams, Raymond (8 January 2001). Introduction to Swaminarayan Hinduism. Cambridge: Cambridge University Press. ISBN 0 521 65279 0.
- Williams, Raymond Brady (2018), Introduction to Swaminarayan Hinduism, Cambridge University Press

Web-sources
