= Swaminarayan Sampradaya =

Hindu sect founded in 1801 by Sahajanand Swami

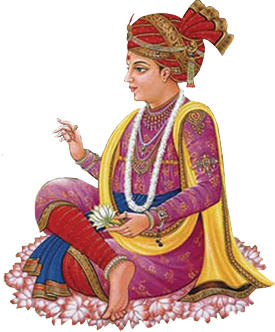
- Swaminarayan, founder of the Swaminarayan Sampradaya

Total population
- 5,000,000

Founder
- Swaminarayan

Regions with significant populations
- Gujarat

Religions
- Hinduism

Scriptures
- Shikshapatri; Vachanamrut; Satsangi Jivan; Desh Vibhag Lekh

Languages
- Sanskrit; Gujarati

The Swaminarayan Sampradaya, also known as Swaminarayan Hinduism and Swaminarayan movement, is a Hindu Vaishnava sampradaya rooted in Ramanuja's Vishishtadvaita, (Note: relation with Vishistadvaita: Shree Swaminarayan Mandir Vadtal: "Swaminarayan propagated a philosophy called Vishistadvaita." (Note: Official Website of Shree Swaminarayan Mandir Vadtal, Swaminarayan Sect); Brahmbhatt 2016b: "Sahajanand explicitly states that his school of Vedanta is Ramanuja's Vishishtadvaita," while "he also states that his system of devotional praxis is based on the Vallabha tradition."; Brahmbhatt 2016b: "Certain portions of Swaminarayan Vedanta commentaries indicate an affinity for Vishishtadvaita's interpretation of canonical texts; others indicate overlap with Shuddhadvaita School, and yet others are altogether unique interpretations."; Williams (2018, p. 38): "They are not Shrivaishnavas, but they do propagate a theology that developed in relation to the modified nondualism of Ramanuja and they follow the devotional path within Vaishnavism"; Kim 2005: "The philosophical foundation for Swaminarayan devotionalism is the viśiṣṭādvaita, or qualified non-dualism, of Rāmānuja (1017–1137 ce)."; Dwyer 2018, p. 186: "The sect's origin in Vishistadvaita"; Beckerlegge 2008: "Swaminarayan theology is largely dependent on Ramanuja's theistic Vedanta and the Vishishtadvaita tradition"; Herman 2010, p. 153: "Most certainly, the sect is directly tied to traditional Vishishtadvaita as expounded by Ramanuja in the 12th century.; Roshen Dalal (2020), Hinduism: An Alphabetical Guide, Penguin Books India: "Swaminarayan's philosophy is said to be similar to Vishistadvaita, with some minor differences."; Williams (2018, p. 91): "Ramanuja allowed for some distinction within the ultimate reality, and Sahajanand elaborated on this duality by indicating that two entities, Purushottam and Akshar, are eternal and free from the illusion of maya."; Yogi Trivedi (2016), p. 134: "...there were many who followed [after Shankara]: Ramanuja (eleventh–twelfth centuries), Madhva (thirteenth century), Vallabha, and those in Chaitanya's tradition (both fifteenth–sixteenth centuries), to mention four of the most prominent. It is within the Vedantic tradition, particularly as expressed in the thinking of these four bhakti ācāryas (acharyas), that Swaminarayan's doctrine emerged. Swaminarayan was keen to engage with this Vedanta commentarial tradition by presenting his own theological system."; Dwyer 2018, p. 185: "While vishistadvaita forms the theological and philosophical basis of the Swamiyaranam sect, there are several significant differences.") (Note: The sect has in the past claimed not to belong to Hinduism in order to deny entry to the marginalized or Dalit groups) characterized by the worship of its charismatic founder Sahajanand Swami, better known as Swaminarayan (1781–1830), whom many regard as an avatar of Krishna or as the highest manifestation of Purushottam, the supreme God. According to the tradition's lore, both the religious group and Sahajanand Swami became known as Swaminarayan after the Swaminarayan mantra, which is a compound of two Sanskrit words, swami ("master, lord" (Note: Shree Swaminarayan Mandir Kalupur-Ahmedabad, Lord Swaminarayan and His Sampraday)) and Narayan (supreme God, Vishnu). (Note: The Swaminarayan mantra is a compound of two Sanskrit words, swami (an initiated ascetic but here "master, lord") and Narayan (supreme God, Vishnu). Originally, the name refers to one entity, namely Lord Narayan. Some later branches, including the BAPS, believe that Swami denotes Aksharbrahman (God's ideal devotee), namely Gunatitanand Swami, as identified by Sahajanand Swami, and Narayan denotes Parabrahman (God), a reference to Sahajanand Swami himself. The latter interpretation recalls an earlier Vaishnava tradition of the divine companionship between the perfect devotee and God (for example, Radha and Krishna or Lakshmi and Vishnu).)

During his lifetime, Swaminarayan institutionalized his charisma and beliefs in various ways. He constructed six mandirs to facilitate followers' devotional worship of God, and encouraged the creation of a scriptural tradition. In 1826, in a legal document titled the Lekh, Swaminarayan created two dioceses, the Laxmi Narayan Dev Gadi (Vadtal Gadi) and Nar Narayan Dev Gadi (Ahmedabad Gadi), with a hereditary leadership of acharyas and their wives, who were authorized to install statues of deities in temples and to initiate ascetics.

In Swaminarayan's soteriology the ultimate goal of life is to become Brahmarūpa, attaining the form (rūpa) of Aksharbrahman, in which the jiva is liberated from maya and saṃsāra (the cycle of births and deaths), and enjoys eternal bliss, offering sādhya bhakti, continuous and pure devotion to God.

While rooted in Ramanuja's Vishishtadvaita, for which he stated his affinity, (Note: Brahmbhatt (2016): "Sahajanand explicitly states that his school of Vedanta is Ramanuja's Vishishtadvaita." See Shikshapatri Shlok 121: "Vishishtadvaita is accepted as the Lord's philosophy. From the various philosophies - Advaita, Kevaladvaita, Shuddhadvaita, Vishishtadvaita etc. the Lord accepts Ramanuja's philosophy of Vishishtadvaita (special theory of non-dualism) as accurate." (Note: Shikshapatri Shlok 121)) and incorporating devotional elements of Vallabha's Pushtimarg, (Note: Shruti Patel (2017): "it is probable that Sahajanand did not possess the means by which to initiate his views and have them or him be seamlessly accepted in western India at the outset of the century. For this reason, first incorporating common and observable aspects of Vaishava culture would have mitigated his appearing unknown, made Sahajanand's aims seem less drastic, and contributed to advancing his local influence in with an aura of rootedness. By identifying with the widely-recognised Pustimarg in the course of worshipping Krsna the Svaminarayan foundation could be related to an identifiable, solidified ethos. Particularly, assimilation would be achieved more effortlessly with the adoption of select Pustimarg symbols. And yet, this would not require the sacrifice of core ideas or independence.") Sahajanand Swaminarayan gave his own specific interpretations of the classical Hindu texts. As in Vishishtadvaita, God and jiva are forever distinct, but a distinction is also made between Parabrahman (Purushottama, Narayana, the highest Brahman) and Aksharbrahman ('lower Brahman', the first manifestation of Brahman in empirical reality) as two distinct eternal realities. (Note: 17th World Sanskrit Conference Recognizes Bhagwan Swaminarayan's Akshar-Purushottam Darshan as a Distinct Vedanta Tradition) This distinction is emphasized by BAPS-swamis as a defining characteristic, and referred to as Akshar-Purushottam Darshan to distinguish the Swaminarayan Darshana, Swaminarayan's views or teachings, from other Vedanta-traditions. (Note: BAPS Swaminarayan Research Institute, HH Mahant Swami Maharaj Inaugurates the Svāminārāyaṇasiddhāntasudhā and Announces Parabrahman Svāminārāyaṇa's Darśana as the Akṣara-Puruṣottama Darśana Archived 9 July 2021 at the Wayback Machine)

In the 20th century, due to "different interpretations of authentic successorship," various denominations split-off from the dioceses. All groups regard Swaminarayan as God, but differ in their theology and the religious leadership they accept. The BAPS, split-off in 1907 from Vadtal Gadi, venerates "a lineage of akṣaragurus, or living gurus, [which] has been retroactively traced back to Gunatitanand Swami."

Socially, Swaminarayan accepted caste-based discrimination within the religious community, but inspired followers to engage in humanitarian service activities, leading various denominations of the Swaminarayan Sampradaya to currently provide humanitarian service globally.

== Early history ==
=== Origins ===
The Swaminarayan Sampradaya developed out of Ramanand Swami's Uddhav Sampraday, a Gujarat-based Sri Vaishnavism teacher rooted in Ramanuja's Vishishtadvaita. It takes its name from Ramanand's successor, Sahajanand Swami, who was a charismatic leader and gained fame as Swaminarayan. The various branches of the Swaminarayan-tradition relate their origin to Sahajanand Swami, but an exact "modern historical account" of his life cannot be reconstructed, given the hagiographic nature of the stories preserved among his followers.

=== Sahajanand Swami ===
Sahajanand Swami was born on 3 April 1781 in the village of Chhapaiya in present-day Uttar Pradesh, India, and given the name Ghansyam. After his parents' death, he renounced his home at the age of 11 and traveled for 7 years as a child yogi around India, taking the name Neelkanth, before settling in the hermitage of Ramanand Swami, a Vaishnava religious leader in present-day Gujarat. Ramanand Swami initiated him as a Vaishnavite ascetic on 28 October 1800, giving him the name Sahajanand Swami. According to the Swaminarayan-tradition, Ramanand appointed Sahajanand to be his successor and the leader of the sampradaya in 1801, shortly before his death.

Ramanand Swami died on 17 December 1801, and Sahajanand Swami became the new leader of the remains of the Uddhav Sampraday, despite "considerable opposition." Several members left the group, or were expelled by Sahajanand Swami, and one group established a new group, together with one of the four temples of Ramanand. While the Krishna-iconography in the original temples, as well as the Vachanamritam and the Shikshapatri, reflect a belief in Krishna as Purushottam, as early as 1804, Sahajanand Swami himself was described as the manifestation of God, and over his life, he would be worshipped as God by thousands of followers. Nevertheless, according to Kim in the original sampradaya Sahajanand Swami is not "necessarily" regarded as Purushottam. (Note: Several years after the establishment of the sampradaya, the 19th-century Hindu reformer Dayananda Saraswati questioned the acceptance of Sahajanand Swami as a manifestation of God in the sect. According to Dayananda, Sahajananda decked himself out as Narayan to gain disciples.)

In time, both the leader and the group became known by the name "Swaminarayan." According to the "Swaminarayan origin narrative", shortly after his succession, Sahajanand Swami directed devotees to chant a new mantra, "Swaminarayan" (Svāmīnārāyaṇa), a compound of two Sanskrit words: Swami (Svāmī) and Narayan (Nārāyaṇa), that is, Vishnu c.q. Purushottam. According to the Swaminarayan-tradition, Narayana was also a second name given to Naharajand when he was initiated as an ascetic.

=== Growth and opposition ===
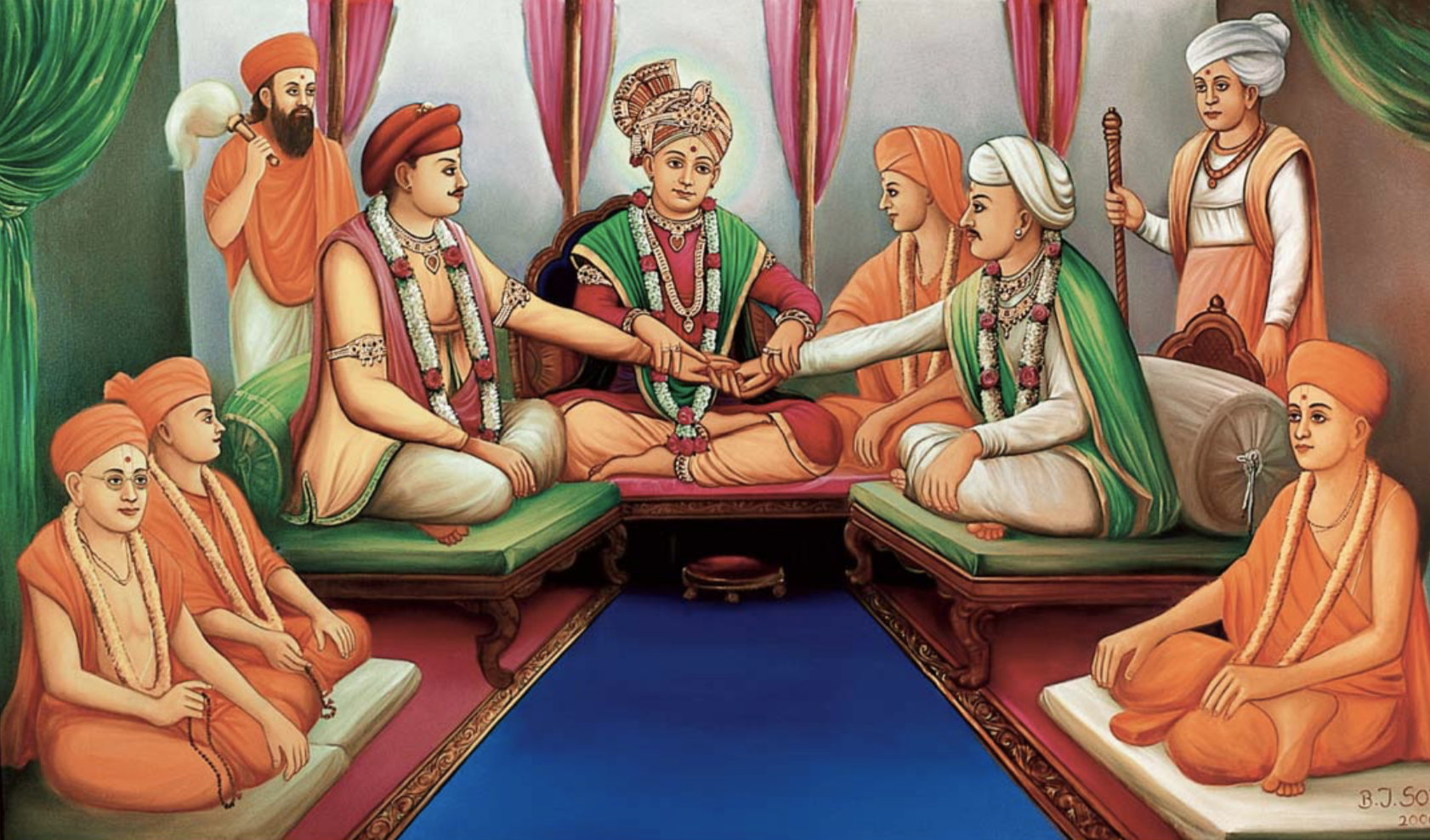
Swaminarayan, acharyas, and ascetics

The sampradaya grew quickly over the 30 years under Swaminarayan's leadership, with British sources estimating at least 100,000 followers by the 1820s. He was a charismatic personality, and in the early period of the Swaminarayan movement, followers were often induced into a visionary trance state interpreted as samadhi, either by direct contact with Swaminarayan or by chanting the Swaminarayan mantra, in which they had visions of their "chosen deity" (istadevata). Swaminarayan was criticized for receiving large gifts from his followers after renouncing the world and assuming leadership of the fellowship. Swaminarayan responded that he accepts gifts because "it was appropriate for the person to give" and to satisfy the devotion of his followers but he does not seek it out of personal desire.

In the first fifteen years of his leadership, until the arrival of the British colonizers in Gujarat, Swaminarayan's ministry "faced great opposition," and a number of attempts at his life, "by both religious and secular powers," are reported. Swaminarayan accepted people from all castes, undermining caste-based discrimination, which lead to criticism and opposition from high-caste Hindus. While Sahajanand's ethical reforms have been regarded as a protest against immoral Pushtimarg practices, Sahajanand was in fact influenced by and positive towards Vallabha and other Vaisnava-traditions, and he incorporated elements of Vallabha's Pushtimarg, popular in Gujarat, to gain recognition. His reforms may have been primarily targeted against Tantrics, and against practices "associated with village and tribal deities."

According to David Hardiman, the lower classes were attracted to Swaminarayan's community because they aspired to the same success and mercantile ideology. It grew, states Hardiman, in an era of British colonial rule where land taxes were raised to unprecedented heights, lands were "snatched from village communities", and poverty spread. According to Hardiman, Sahajanand's pacifist approach to community re-organization and reaching out to the lowest classes of his day found support with the British rulers, but it also furthered their exploitation by the British, the local moneylenders and richer farmers.

Swaminarayan ordained 3,000 swamis over the span of his leadership, with 500 of them into the highest state of asceticism as paramhansas, thereby allowing them to suspend all distinguishing practices, like applying sacred marks. (Note: His followers, particularly his ascetics, also faced harassment. Swaminarayan's ascetics, who were easily identifiable, had to refrain from retaliation and angry responses. To help them escape such harassment, at 30 June 1807 Swaminarayan ordained 500 swamis into the highest state of asceticism as paramhansas, thereby allowing them to suspend all distinguishing practices, like applying sacred marks.) Swaminarayan encouraged his swamis to serve others. During the devastating famine of 1813–14 in Kathiawar, for example, the swamis collected alms in unaffected regions of Gujarat to distribute among the afflicted. As teachers and preachers, they were instrumental in spreading Swaminarayan's teachings throughout Guajarat, which aided to the rapid growth of the sampradaya, and they created the "sacred literature" of the sampradaya, authoring scriptural commentaries and composing bhakti poetry.

=== Temples ===
Toward the end of his life, Swaminarayan institutionalized his charisma in various ways: the building of temples to facilitate worship; the writing of sacred texts; and the creation of a religious organization for the initiation of ascetics. He instituted the mandir tradition of the sampradaya to provide followers a space for devotional worship (upasana, upāsanā) to God. He constructed six mandirs in the following locations, housing images of Krishna which are regarded as representations of Swaminarayan by his followers:

- Swaminarayan Temple, Ahmedabad dedicated to Nar Narayan (1822)
- Swaminarayan Mandir, Bhuj dedicated to Nar Narayan (1823)
- Swaminarayan Mandir, Vadtal dedicated to Radha Krishna and Lakshmi Narayan (1824)
- Shri Swaminarayan Mandir, Dholera dedicated to Radha Madan Mohan (1826)
- Shri Swaminarayan Mandir, Junagadh dedicated to Ranchhodrai and Radha Ramandev (1827)
- Swaminarayan Mandir, Gadhada dedicated to Radha Gopinath (1828).

Swaminarayan installed murtis of various manifestations of Krishna in the temples. For example, idol of Vishnu was installed with his consort Lakshmi and idol of Krishna was installed with his consort Radha to highlight the representation of God and his ideal devotee in the central shrines of each of these temple. He also installed his own image in the form of Harikrishna in a sideshrine at the mandir at Vadtal. The BAPS initiated the tradition of installing murtis of God (Swaminarayan) and his ideal devotee to facilitate his followers' pursuit of moksha.

=== Vadtal Gadi and Ahmedabad Gadi ===
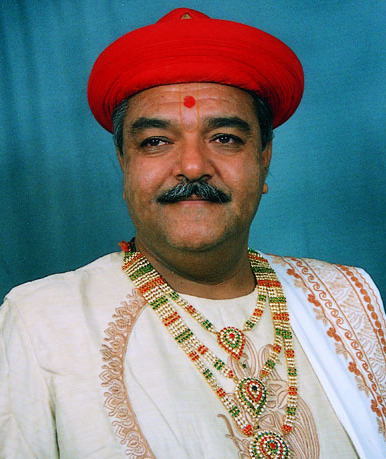
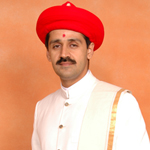
Acharya Ajendraprasad & Acharya Koshalendraprasad

In the early years of the sampradaya, Swaminarayan personally directed control of the spiritual and administrative duties. Swaminarayan later delegated responsibilities amongst swamis, householders, and the members of his family. Before his death, Swaminarayan established two dioceses, the Laxmi Narayan Dev Gadi (Vadtal Gadi) and Nar Narayan Dev Gadi (Ahmedabad Gadi) as recorded in the Lekh, based on the Vadtal and Ahmedabad mandirs, respectively.

=== Acharyas ===
On 21 November 1825, he appointed two of his nephews as acharyas to administer the two gadis, or dioceses, adopting them as his own sons and establishing a hereditary line of succession. These acharyas came from his immediate family after sending representatives to search them out in Uttar Pradesh. They were authorized to "administer his temple properties" which are distributed among them. Ayodhyaprasadji, son of his elder brother Rampratap, became acharya of the Nar Narayan Dev Gadi (Ahmedabad diocese), and Raghuvirji, son of his younger brother Ichcharam, became acharya of the Laxmi Narayan Dev Gadi (Vadtal diocese). (Note: Their descendants continue the hereditary line of succession. He formally adopted a son from each of his brothers and appointed him to the office of acharya. Swaminarayan decreed that the office should be hereditary so that acharyas would maintain a direct line of blood descent from his family. Swaminarayan stated to all the devotees and saints to obey both the Acharyas and Gopalanand Swami who was considered as the main pillar and chief ascetic for the sampradaya. Their respective wives, known as the ‘Gadiwala’, are the initiator of all female Satsangis. The current acharya of the Nar Narayan Dev Gadi is Koshalendraprasad Pande, while there is currently an active case regarding the leadership of Vadtal Gadi between Dev paksh, the faction led by Rakeshprasad Pande, and Siddhant paksh, which is led by Ajendraprasad Pande. Gujarat high court has stayed the Nadiad court order removing Ajendraprasad until a final verdict is reached. He is restrained from enjoying the rights of acharya during the proceedings. Dev paksh, governing the Vadtal temple trust, has appointed Rakeshprasad to act and officiate as acharya.) Siddhant paksh believes Ajendraprasad is the current acharya of the Vadtal Gadi. Due to Swaminarayan's initiation into the Uddhav sampradaya, the Vadtal and Ahmedabad-branches trace the authority of their acharyas to Ramanuja's guru parampara.

=== Death of Swaminarayan ===
Swaminarayan died on 1 June 1830, but the sampradaya continued to grow, with British officials counting 287,687 followers by 1872. By 2001, the number of members had grown to an estimated 5 million followers.

=== Schisms ===
Currently the following branches exist:

- Laxmi Narayan Dev Gadi (Vadtal Gadi) (1825, established by Swaminarayan)

- International Swaminarayan Satsang Mandal (ISSM)(daughter-branch, USA)
- Laxminarayan Dev Yuvak Mandal (LNDYM)(youth-wing)
- Shree Swaminarayan Agyna Upasana Satsang Mandal (SSAUSM)(daughter-branch, USA)

- Bochasanwasi Akshar Purushottam Swaminarayan Sanstha (BAPS)(split-off from Vadtal Gadi in 1907, established by Shastriji Maharaj)

- Gunatit Samaj (Yogi Divine Society (YDS), split-off from BAPS in 1966. Several wings:YDS, The Anoopam Mission, and The Gunatit Jyot

- Swaminarayan Gurukul (educational institution established in 1947, by Dharmajivandasji Swami in order to spread sadvidya in students around the world)

- Nar Narayan Dev Gadi (Ahmedabad Gadi) (1825, established by Swaminarayan)

- International Swaminarayan Satsang Organisation (ISSO)(daughter-branch, USA)

- ISSO Seva (2001, charity organisation)

- Narnarayan Dev Yuvak Mandal (NNDYM)(youth organisation)

- Swaminarayan Gadi (Maninagar)(split-off from Ahmedabad Gadi in the 1940s)

- Swaminarayan Mandir Vasna Sanstha (SMVS)(split-off from Swaminarayan Gadi in 1987)

==== Different interpretations of succession ====
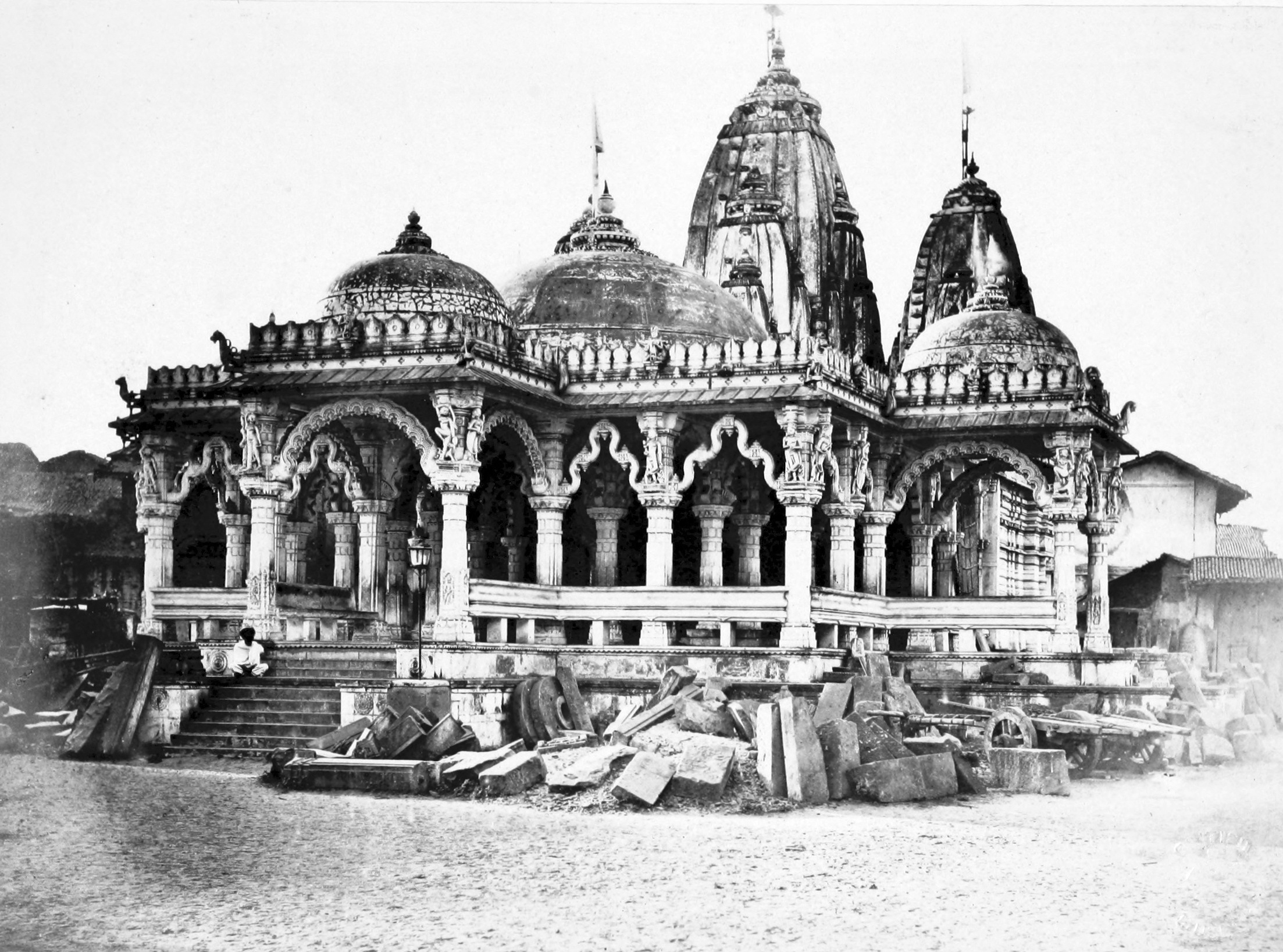
Swaminarayan temple Ahmedabad 1866

In the 20th century, due to "different interpretations of authentic successorship," various branches split-off from the diocese, the largest being the BAPS. All groups regard Swaminarayan as the manifestation of God but differ in their theology and the religious leadership they accept.

The Vadtal Gadi and Ahmedabad Gadi are the original institutions, with a hereditary leadership in the form of acharyas. The succession was established in the Lekh, a legal document authored by Swaminarayan. It is followed by the Nar-Narayan (Ahmedabad) and Laxmi-Narayan (Vadtal) branches, but "downplay[ed] or ignored" by other branches that "emphasis the authority of the sadhus over the acharya." (Note: Williams 2018, p. 208: "The original Ahmedabad and Vadtal dioceses value the Lekh, where as those groups that emphasis the authority of the sadhus over the acharya and different lineages of gurus downplay or ignore the lekh as simply an administrative document for temporary application and not as sacred scripture. Baps emphasizes the Swamini Vato, which contains the sayings of Gunatitanand.")

Williams notes that "this important function of the acharya as religious specialist is emphasized in all the Swaminarayan scriptures including the Desh Vibhag Lekh. In the Shikshapatri Verse 62: 'My followers should worship only those images of the lord that are given by the acharya or installed by him. In Vachanamrut Vadtal I-18.4 and in other scriptures, Swaminarayan signifies the importance of Dharmakul (family of Dharmadev, Swaminarayan's father), and states that those who know him to be their deity and desire moksha shall follow only the Swaminarayan Sampraday under the leadership of the acharyas which he has established and their successors.

According to the Vadtal branch, "Gopalanand Swami was the chief ascetic disciple of Sajahanand," and "the acharyas have the sole authority to initiate sadhus and to install images in the temples." According to the BAPS, the largest Swaminarayan offshoot, Gunatitanand Swami was appointed successor of Sajahanand, and "the chief ascetics had been given the authority to perform the primary rituals of the group, including the initiation of sadhus," and "this authority had not been revoked when the acharyas were appointed." They furthermore argue that those who life a strictly virtuous life are the ones worthy of inheritance. According to Williams, "[t]he emphasis is on the spiritual lineage rather than the hereditary lineage, and the claim is that the one who observes the rules should be the acharya."

According to the BAPS, Swaminarayan established two modes of succession: a hereditary administrative mode through the Lekh; and a spiritual mode established in the Vachanamrut, in which Swaminarayan conveyed his theological doctrines. According to the BAPS, Swaminarayan described a spiritual mode of succession whose purpose is purely soteriological, reflecting his principle that a form of God who lives "before one's eyes" is necessary for aspirants to attain moksha (liberation). They venerate "a lineage of akṣaragurus, or living gurus, [which] has been retroactively traced back to Gunatitanand Swami." According to the BAPS, Swaminarayan identified Gunatitanand Swami as the first successor in this lineage. For the sadhus of the Vadtal diocese, the idea that Swaminarayan had appointed Gunatitanand as his spiritual successor was a heretical teaching, and they "refused to worship what they considered to be a human being."

==== Bochasanwasi Akshar Purushottam Swaminarayan Sanstha ====
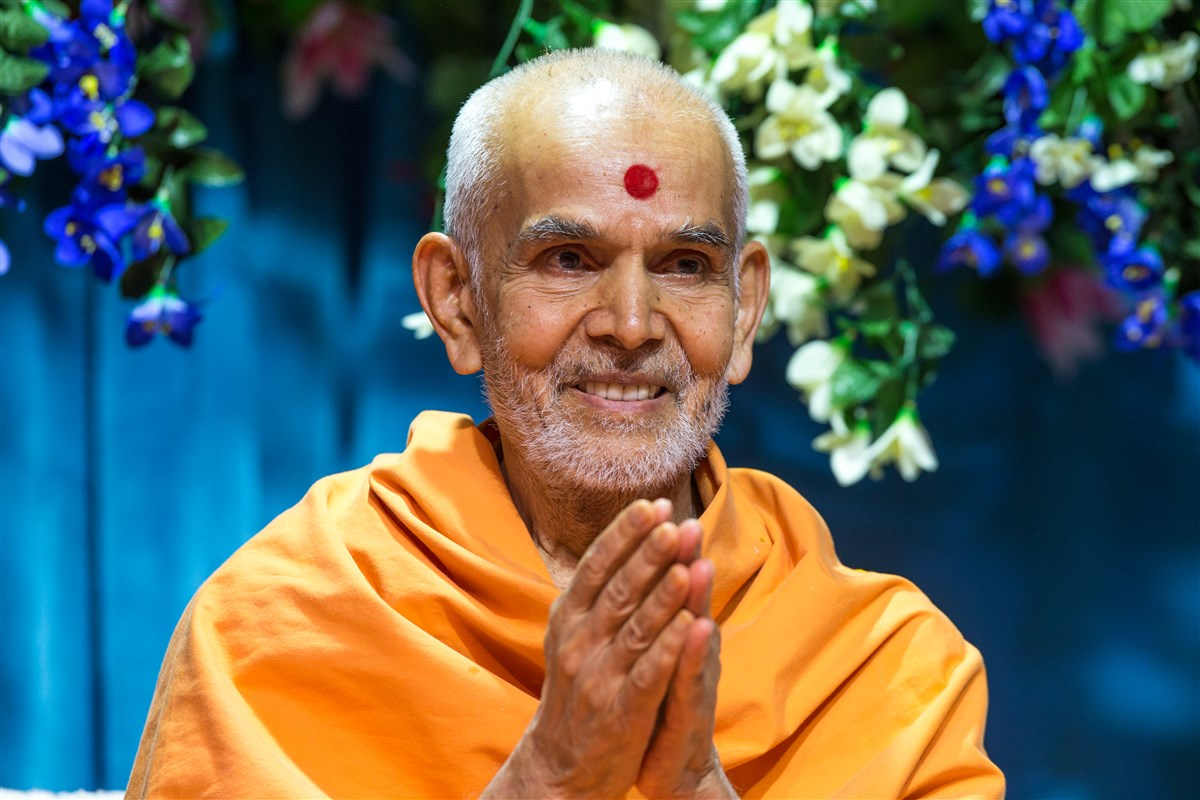
Mahant Swami Maharaj, current guru and president of BAPS

The Bochasanwasi Akshar Purushottam Swaminarayan Sanstha (BAPS) was formed in 1907, by Shastriji Maharaj (Shastri Yagnapurushdas). He broke away from the Vadtal diocese and created BAPS according to his own interpretation of Akshar (Aksharbrahma) and Purushottam. As articulated in the BAPS-theology of Akṣara-Puruṣottama Upāsanā, (Note: Swaminarayan sanshta, Worship of God with the Guru - Akshar Purushottam Philosophy) BAPS adherents, following Shastriji Maharaj, believe that Swaminarayan introduced Gunatitanand Swami as his ideal devotee, from which a spiritual lineage of gurus began, reflecting Shastriji Maharaj's idea that a form of God who lives "before one's eyes" who is to be worshipped is necessary for aspirants to attain moksha (liberation). (Note: The lineage of gurus for BAPS begin with Gunatitanand Swami, followed by Bhagatji Maharaj, Shastriji Maharaj, Yogiji Maharaj, Pramukh Swami Maharaj, and presently Mahant Swami.)

===== Gunatit Samaj =====
The Yogi Divine Society (YDS) was established in 1966, by Dadubhai Patel and his brother, Babubhai after they were excommunicated from BAPS by Yogiji Maharaj. The brothers were expelled after it was discovered that Dadubhai illicitly collected and misappropriated funds and, falsely claiming that he was acting on the organization's behalf, led a number of young women to renounce their families and join his ashram under his leadership. After Dadubhai's death in 1986, an ascetic named Hariprasad Swami became the leader of the Yogi Divine Society. Yogi Divine Society became known as the Gunatit Samaj and consists of several wings: namely, YDS, The Anoopam Mission, and The Gunatit Jyot.

==== Swaminarayan Gadi (Maninagar) ====
The Swaminarayan Gadi (Maninagar) was founded in the 1940s by Muktajivandas Swami after he left the Ahmedabad diocese with the belief that Gopalanand Swami, a paramhansa from Swaminarayan's time, was the spiritual successor to Swaminarayan. The current spiritual leader is Jitendrapriyadasji Swami. In addition, the Swaminarayan Gadi reveres Nirgundasji Swami, Ishwarcharandasji Swami, and Purushottampriya Swami. (Note: Swaminarayan Gadi (Maninagar) lineage of gurus begin with Gopalanand Swami, Nirgundas Swami, Abji Bapa, Ishwarcharandas Swami, Muktajivandas Swami, Purushottampriyadasji Maharaj Swami)

Followers of the Swaminarayan Gadi accept the Rahasyarth Pradeepika Tika, a five-volume work written by Abji Bapa, as an authentic exegesis of the Vachanamrut.

== Beliefs and practices ==
Swaminarayan's views are found in the Vachanamrut (Vacanāmṛta), the principal theological text of the Swaminarayan Sampradaya. As followers believe Swaminarayan to be the manifestation of Parabrahman, or Puruṣottama, his views are considered a direct revelation of God. In the Vachanamrut, Swaminarayan describes that the ultimate goal of life is moksha (mokṣa), a spiritual state of ultimate liberation from the cycle of births and deaths and characterized by eternal bliss and devotion to God.

=== Background ===
Swaminayaran's siddhanta ("view," "doctrine") emerged within the Vedanta tradition, particularly the Vaishnava tradition as articulated by Ramanuja, Madhva, Vallabha, and Chaitanya. Swaminarayan's interpretation of the classical Hindu texts has similarities with Ramanuja's Vishistadvaita, for which he stated his affinity. He also incorporated elements of Vallabha's Pushtimarg, which belongs to Shuddhadvaita, to gain recognition. Yet, there are also metaphysical and philosophical divergences between Swaminarayan's and Ramanuja's teachings, most notably the distinction between Purushottam and Aksharbrahman, referred to by BAPS-swamis as the Akshar-Purushottam Darshan (philosophy) and used to set apart Swaminarayan's teachings from other Vedanta traditions. While the Vadtal Mandir states that "Swaminarayan propagated a philosophy called Vishistadvaita," a number of BAPS-swamis argue that Swaminarayan's teachings are a distinct system within the Vedanta-tradition.

=== Soteriology - Brahmarūp ===
In Swaminarayan's soteriology, the ultimate goal of life is to become Brahmarūp, attaining the form (rūpa) of Aksharbrahman, (Note: Wisdom Library, Brahmarupa) in which the jiva is liberated from maya and saṃsāra (the cycle of births and deaths), and in which the jiva offers sādhya bhakti, continuous and pure devotion to God. Whereas identification with Purushottam is impossible, Brahmarūpa as identification with Akshrabrahman is feasible and encouraged, though the jiva or ishwar remains distinct from Aksharbrahman.

To become Brahmarūp, an individual must overcome the ignorance of maya, which Swaminarayan describes as self-identification with the physical body, personal talents, and material possessions. (Note: See Sahajānanda 2015: Gadhada II.50, Gadhada III.39, Kariyani 12.) Swaminarayan explains in the Vachanamrut that ekantik dharma is a means to earn God's grace and attain liberation. (Note: See Sahajānanda 2015: Gadhada II.21, Gadhada III.21, Sarangpur 11) Ekantik dharma (ekāntik dharma) consists of dharma (dharma; religious and moral duties), gnan (jñāna; realization of the atman and Paramatman) vairagya (vairāgya; dispassion for worldly objects), and bhakti (recognition of Swaminarayan as Purushottam and devotion to him, coupled with the understanding of God's greatness).

Various branches of the Swaminarayan Sampradaya differ in their belief of how to attain moksha. The Narnarayan and Laxminarayan Gadis believe moksha is attained by worshipping the sacred images of Swaminarayan installed by acharyas. In the BAPS reading of the Vachanamrut and other scriptures, the jiva becomes brahmarūp, or like Aksharbrahman, under the guidance of the manifest form of God. (Note: See Sahajānanda 2015: Gadhada I.21, Gadhada II.28, Gadhada II.45, Gadhada II.66, Gadhada III.2, Gadhada III.7, Gadhada III.10, Sarangpur 9.) The Swaminarayan Gadi (Maninagar) believes that moksha can be attained through the lineage of gurus beginning with Gopalanand Swami.

=== Ekantik dharma ===
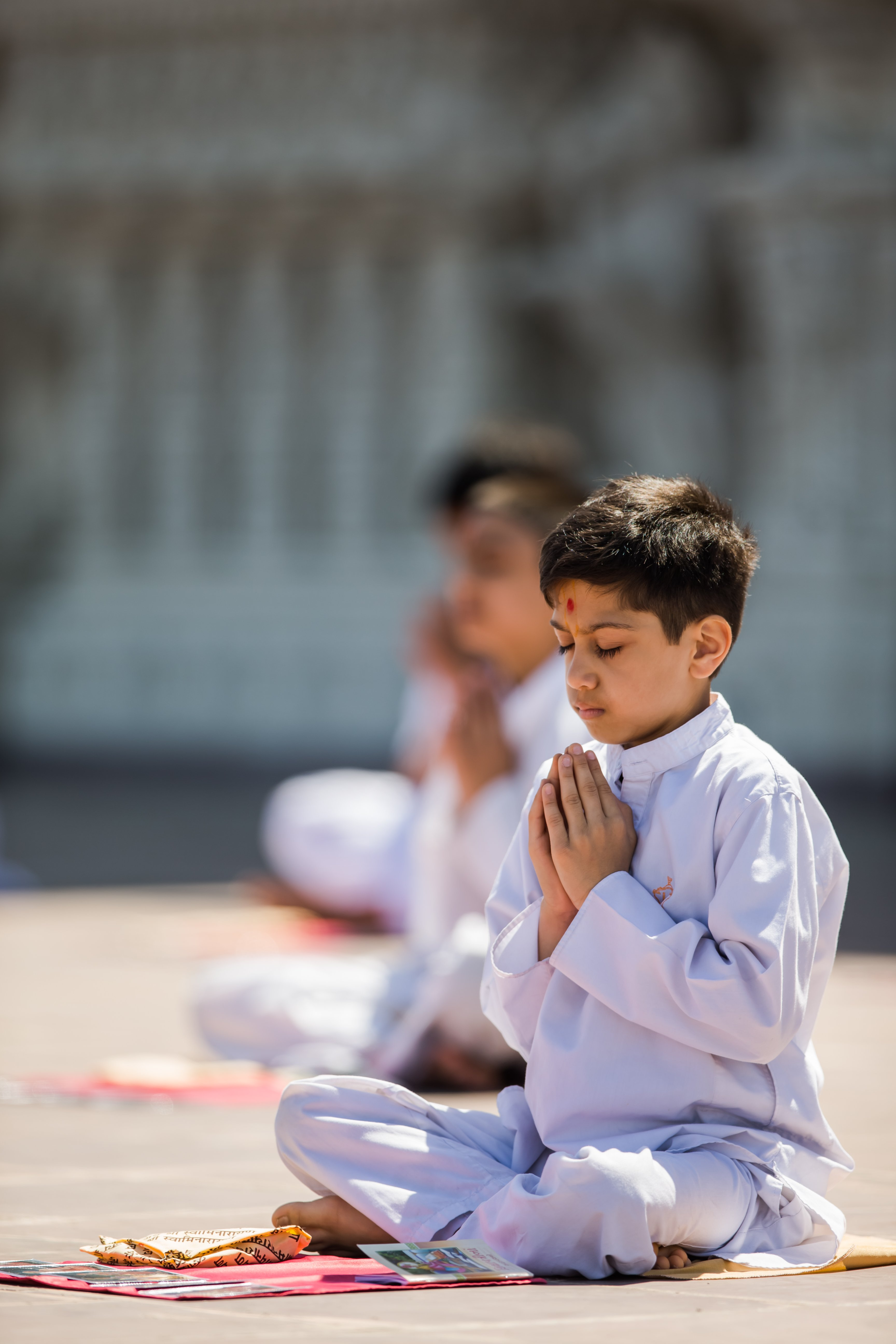
Boy offering personal worship

Ekantik dharma (ekāntik dharma) is an important element of the Swaminarayan Sampradaya, and its establishment is one of the reasons why Swaminarayan is believed to have incarnated. Ekantik dharma consists of dharma, gnan, vairagya, and bhakti. (Note: See Sahajānanda 2015: Sarangpur 11, Gadhada II.21, and Gadhada III.21.)

==== Dharma ====
Dharma consists of religious and moral duties according to one's responsibilities and situation. All Swaminarayan Hindus who are householders maintain five basic vows: abstaining from theft, gambling, adultery, meat, and intoxicants like alcohol. As part of their dharma, swamis additionally endeavor to perfect the five virtues of non-lust (nishkam/niṣkāma), non-greed (nirlobh/nirlobha), non-attachment (nissneh/nissneha), non-taste (niswad/nissvada), and non-ego (nirman/nirmāna). Another aspect of the practice of dharma is the Swaminarayan diet, a type of vegetarianism, similar to that practiced generally by Vaishnava sampradayas, that entails abstaining from animal flesh, eggs, onions, and garlic.

==== Gnan (jnana) ====
Gnan is knowledge of Parabrahman and realizing oneself as the atman. Basic practices of gnan include the daily study of scriptures like the Vachanamrut and Shikshapatri and weekly participation in congregational worship services (sabha/sabhā) at the mandir (temple), in which scriptural discourses geared towards personal and spiritual growth occur. According to the BAPS, in the Vachanamrut Swaminarayan explains that adhering to the Aksharbrahman Guru's commands is commensurate with perfectly embodying gnan—that is, realizing oneself as the atman. (Note: See Sahajānanda 2015: Gadhada II.51.)

==== Vairagya ====
Vairagya is dispassion for worldly objects. Swaminarayan Hindus cultivate vairagya through practices like fasting on Ekadashi days, two of which occur every month, and observing extra fasts, during the holy months of Chaturmas (a period of four months between July and October) Vairagya is realized by adhering to the codes of conduct, inclusive of these practices, serving other devotees physically, listening to discourses, and engaging in devotion. (Note: See Sahajānanda 2015: Gadhada III.34.)

==== Bhakti ====
Tilak Chandlo, illustrated

Bhakti involves devotion towards God, while understanding God's greatness and identifying one's inner core — atman — with Aksharbrahman. (Note: See Sahajānanda 2015: Panchala 9.) Adherents believe that they can achieve moksha, or freedom from the cycle of birth and death, by becoming aksharrup (or brahmarup), that is, by attaining qualities similar to Akshar (or Aksharbrahman) and worshipping Purushottam (or Parabrahman; the supreme living entity; God). Important bhakti rituals for Swaminarayan Hindus include puja (pūjā; personal worship of God), arti (ārtī; the ritual waving of lighted wicks around murtis, or images), thal (thāl; the offering of food to murtis of God), and cheshta (ceṣtā; the singing of devotional songs that celebrate the divine acts and form of Swaminarayan).

During puja, adherents ritually worship Swaminarayan, and for the BAPS and some other denominations, also the lineage of Aksharbrahman Gurus through whom Swaminarayan is believed to be manifest. At the beginning of the puja ritual, men imprint a symbol known as the tilak chandlo on their forehead, and women imprint a chandlo. The tilak which is a U-shaped saffron-colored symbol made of sandalwood represents God's feet. The chandlo is a red symbol made of kumkum to symbolize Lakshmi, the goddess of fortune and prosperity. Collectively the two symbolize Lakshmi living in the heart of Swaminarayan.

The worship of Swamianarayan is an important element of the swaminarayan religion. For the Ahmedabad and Vadtal diocese, Swaminarayan is present in his images and in his sacred scriptures. For the BAPS, Narayan, who is Purushottam, can only be reached through contact with Purushottam, in the form of the guru, the abode of god. For the BAPS, by associating with and understanding that Aksharbrahman guru, alternatively referred to as the Satpurush, Ekantik Bhakta or Ekantik Sant, spiritual seekers can transcend the influences of maya and attain spiritual perfection.

Other bhakti rituals included in Swaminarayan religious practice are abhishek (abhiśeka), the bathing of a murti of God, mahapuja (māhāpūjā), a collective worship of God usually performed on auspicious days or festivals, and mansi (mānsi) puja, worship of God offered mentally.

In general, Swaminarayan was positive about "other Vaishnava and Krishnite traditions," and Swaminarayan "adopted three aspects of Vallabhacharya practice," namely "the pattern of temple worship, fasts, and observances of festivals." Shruti Patel argues that such a consistency with existing practices, notably the Pushtimarg, would have aided in "sanctioning [the] novelty" of the Swaminarayan Sampradaya.

=== Manifestation of God ===
Swaminarayan's view on god was theanthropic, the idea that "the most extalted of the manifestations of god are in a divine form in human shape," teaching that "god's divine form has a human-shaped form." Most followers believe that Swaminarayan was the 'manifest' form of this supreme God. By 'manifest', it is understood that the very same transcendent entity who possesses a divine form in his abode assumes a human form that is still "totally divine," but "accessible" to his human devotees.

Three stances regarding the ontological position of Sahajanand Swami, c.q. Swaminarayan, can be found in the tradition and its history: as guru, as an avatar of Krishna, or as a manifestation of God c.q. Purushottam, the highest Godhead, himself.

According to Williams, "Some followers hold the position that Sahajanand taught that Krishna was the highest manifestation of Parabrahman or Purushottam and that he was the only appropriate object of devotion and meditation." According to Kim, in the original sampradaya "Sahajanand Swami is not necessarily seen to occupy the space of ultimate reality," purna purushottam, and the Krishna-iconography in the original temples, as well as the Vachanamritam and the Shikshapatri, reflect a belief in Krishna as Purushottam.

According to Williams another, more accepted idea, is that "Sahajanand was a manifestation of Krishna," an understanding reflected in the Ahmedabad and Vadtal mandirs, where statues of NarNarayan and Lakshmi Narayan are enshrined, but where Swaminarayan's uniqueness is also emphasized.

Most followers, including the BAPS, take a third stance, that "Swaminarayan is the single, complete manifestation of Purushottam, the supreme god, superior to [...] all other manifestations of god, including Rama and Krishna." He was thus "not a manifestation of Krishna, as some believed," but "the full manifestation of Purushottam, the supreme person himself." These other manifestations of God, of which Rama and Krishna are two examples, are known as avatars, and according to Paramtattvadas Purushottam (or God) is believed to be "metaphysically different" from them and their cause, the avatarin, whom Swaminarayan revealed as himself.

=== Akshar-Purushottam Darsana ===
The BAPS puts a strong emphasis on the distinction between Akshar and Purushottam, which it sees as a defining difference between Ramanuja's Vishistadvaita and other systems of Vedanta, and Swaminarayan's teachings. While his preference for Ramanuja's theology is stated in the sacred text, the Shikshapatri (Śikṣāpatrī), in his discourses collected in the Vachanamrut Swaminarayan gave a somewhat different explanation of the classical Hindu texts. In Ramanuja's understanding, there are three entities: Parabrahman, maya (māyā), and jiva (jīva). Throughout the Vachanamrut, Swaminarayan identifies five eternal and distinct entities: Parabrahman, Aksharbrahman (Akṣarabrahman, also Akshara, Akṣara, or Brahman), maya, ishwar (īśvara), and jiva. (Note: See Sahajānanda 2015: Gadhada I.7, Gadhada I.39, Gadhada I.42, Gadhada III.10.) This distinction between Akshar and Purushottam is referred to by the BAPS as Akshar-Purushottam Darshan or Aksarabrahma-Parabrahma-Darsanam, (darśana, philosophy) (Note: Another meaning is the sight of the image of God, a holy person, or the guru as the abode of God.) and used as an alternate name for Swaminarayan Darshana, Swaminarayan's views or teachings. This emphasis on the distinction between Akshar and Purushottam is also reflected in its name and the prominent position of Akshar as the living guru.

BAPS-theologian Paramtattvadas (2017) and others further elaborate on these five eternal realities:

God is Parabrahman, the all-doer (kartā, "omniagent"), possessing an eternal and divine form (sākār,) but transcending all entities (sarvoparī, ), and forever manifests on Earth to liberate spiritual seekers (pragat). (Note: See Sahajānanda 2015: Gadhada I.71, Loya 4, Kariyani 10, Vartal 19.)

Aksharbrahman, from akshar (अक्षर, "imperishable," "unalterable"), and Brahman, is the second highest entity and has four forms: 1) Parabrahman's divine abode; 2) the ideal devotee of Parabrahman, eternally residing in that divine abode; 3) the sentient substratum pervading and supporting the cosmos (chidakash, cidākāśa); and 4) the Aksharbrahman Guru, who serves as the manifest form of God on earth. In the BAPS, the gurus is the ideal devotee and Aksharbrahman Guru through whom God guides aspirants to moksha. This further interpretation of Akshar is one of the features that distinguishes Swaminarayan's theology from others. (Note: In Vachanamrut Gadhada I-63, Swaminarayan emphasizes the need to understand Akshar in order to understand God (Parabrahman) perfectly and completely.)

Maya refers to the universal material source used by Parabrahman to create the world. (Note: See Sahajānanda 2015: Gadhada I.13, Gadhada III.10, Loya 17.) Maya has three gunas (guṇas, qualities) which are found to varying degrees in everything formed of it: serenity (sattva), passion (rajas), and darkness (tamas). (Note: See Sahajānanda 2015: Loya 10.) Maya also refers to the ignorance which enshrouds both ishwars and jivas, which results in their bondage to the cycle of births and deaths (transmigration) and subsequently suffering. (Note: See Sahajānanda 2015: Gadhada I.13, Gadhada I.1, Gadhada II.36, Gadhada III.39.)

Ishwars are sentient beings responsible for the creation, sustenance, and dissolution of the cosmos, at the behest of Parabrahman. (Note: See Sahajānanda 2015: Gadhada II.31, Gadhada II.66, Gadhada III.38, Sarangpur 1, Panchala 4 .) While they are metaphysically higher than jivas, they too are bound by maya and must transcend it to attain moksha. (Note: See Sahajānanda 2015: Gadhada II.31, Kariyani 12, Sarangpur 5, Panchala 2.)

Jivas, also known as atmans, are distinct, eternal entities, composed of consciousness that can reside in bodies, animating them. The jiva is inherently pure and flawless, though under the influence of maya, jivas falsely believe themselves to be the bodies they inhabit and remain bound to the cycle of transmigration. (Note: See Sahajānanda 2015: Gadhada I.21, Gadhada I.44, Gadhada III.22, Gadhada III.39, Jetalpur 2.)

== Mandir tradition ==
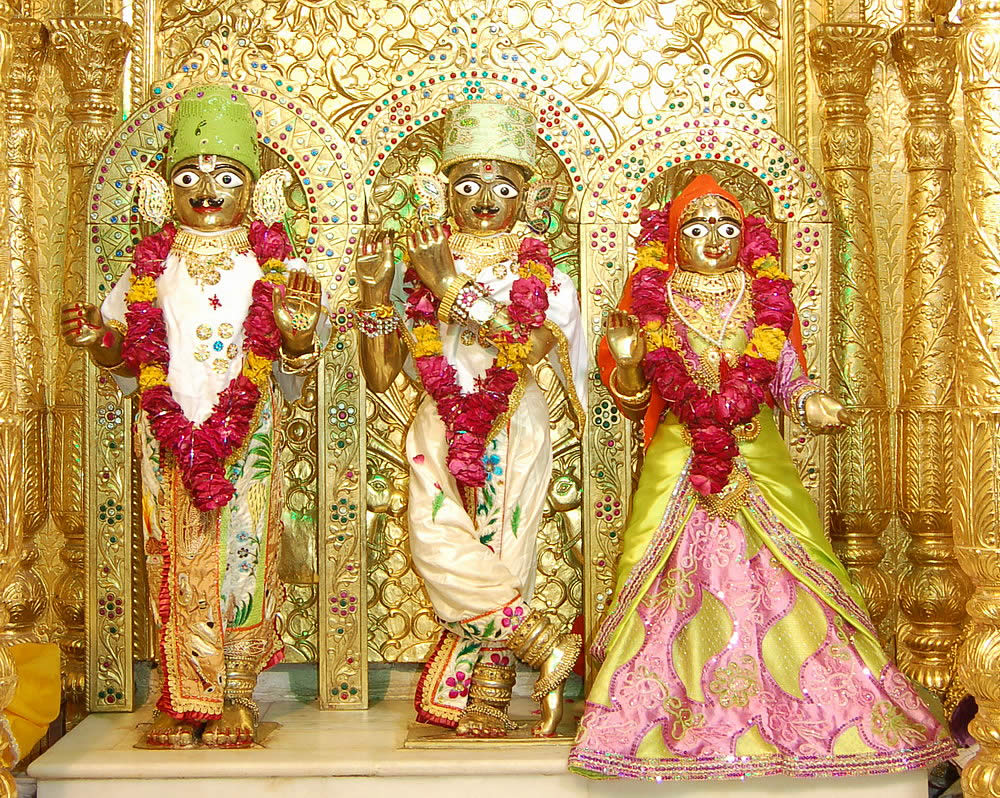
Murtis of Radha (right), Krishna (center) and HariKrishna Maharaj (left) at Swaminarayan Temple, Vadtal

The Swaminarayan Sampradaya is well known for its mandirs, or Hindu places of worship. From Swaminarayan's time through the present, mandirs functioned as centers of worship and gathering as well as hubs for cultural and theological education. They can vary in consecration rituals and architecture, which can be adapted to the means of the local congregation.

=== Murti puja ===
The Swaminarayan Sampradaya is a bhakti tradition that believes God possesses an eternal, divine, human-like, transcendent form. Thus, Swaminarayan mandirs facilitate devotion to God by housing murtis which are believed to resemble God's divine form. The murtis are consecrated through the prana pratishta (prāṅa pratiṣṭha) ceremony, after which God is believed to reside in the murtis. Consequently, the worship practiced in Swaminarayan mandirs is believed to directly reach God.

After the consecration of a mandir, various rituals are regularly performed in it. Arti is a ritual which involves singing a devotional song of praise, while waving a flame before the murtis. Arti is performed five times per day in shikharbaddha mandirs and twice per day in hari mandirs. Thal, a ritual offering of food to God accompanied by devotional songs, is also regularly offered three times per day to the murtis in Swaminarayan mandirs. The sanctified food is distributed to devotees after the ritual.

In all major Swaminarayan temples, usually Radha Krishna, Lakshmi Narayan, Nar Narayan and Swaminarayan idols are worshipped.

Devotees also engage with the murtis in a Swaminarayan mandir through other worship rituals, including darshan, dandvat, and pradakshina. Darshan is the devotional act of viewing the murtis, which are adorned with elegant clothing and ornaments. Dandvats (daṇdavat), or prostrations, before the murtis symbolize surrendering to God. Pradakshina (pradakṣiṇā), or circumambulations around the murtis, express the desire to keep God at the center of the devotees' lives.

=== Community building and worship ===
Swaminarayan mandirs also serve as hubs for congregational worship and theological and cultural education. Singing devotional songs, delivering katha (sermons), and performing rituals such as arti all occur daily in Swaminarayan mandirs. In addition, devotees from the surrounding community gather at least once per week, often on a weekend, to perform these activities congregationally.

Cultural and theological instruction is also delivered on this day of weekly congregation. Cultural instruction may include Gujarati language instruction; training in music and dance; and preparation for festival performances. Theological instruction includes classes on the tradition's history and doctrines, and the life and work of the tradition's gurus.

=== Types of Swaminarayan temples ===
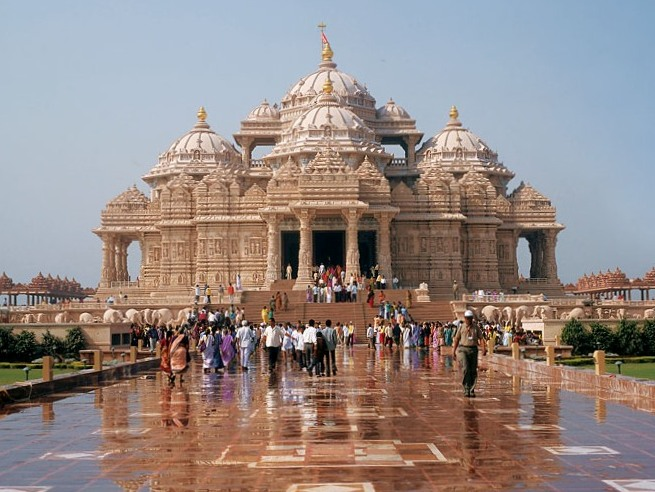
Swaminarayan Akshardham, New Delhi

Swaminarayan followers conduct their worship in various types of mandirs. The homes of Swaminarayan devotees contain ghar mandirs, or home shrines, which serve as spaces for the daily performance of worship and ritual activities such as arti, thal, and reading sermons or scripture.

The majority of freestanding public Swaminarayan mandirs are hari mandirs, whose architectural style and consecration rituals are adopted to the means available to the local congregation.

As a means of expressing their devotion to Swaminarayan and their guru, some congregations elect to construct stone, shikharbaddha mandirs following Hindu architectural scriptures. In addition to being an expression of devotion, congregants strengthen their sense of community by cooperatively volunteering to construct these mandirs.

A fourth type of mandir, called a mahamandiram (mahāmandiram) can be found in India and the United States, in New Delhi, Gandhinagar, Gujarat, and Robbinsville, NJ. These mahamandirs are the largest type of mandir constructed and they contain exhibits which present the life of Swaminarayan and the history of Hinduism in various formats with the goal of inspiring introspection and self-improvement.

== Scriptural tradition ==
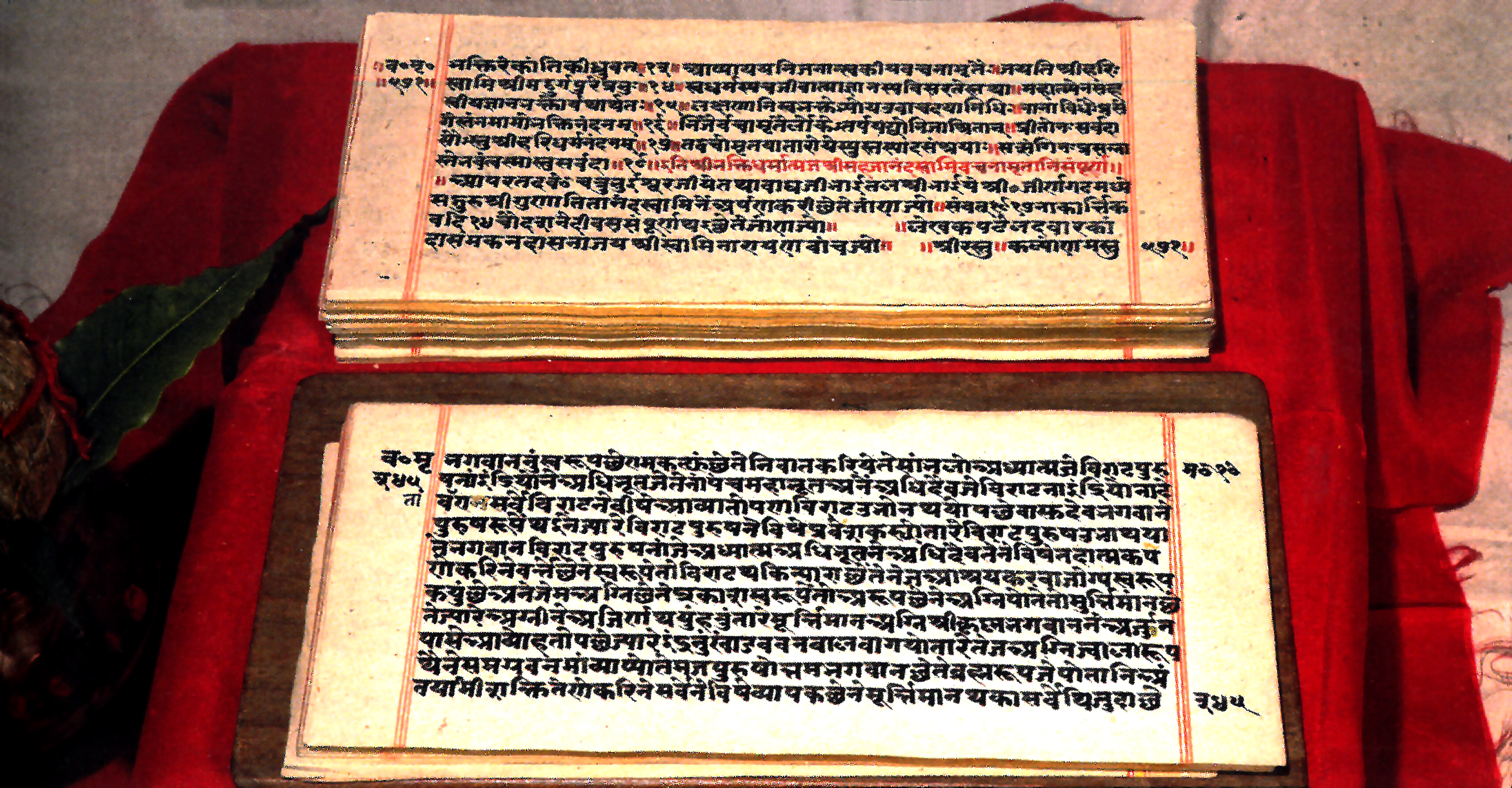
Vachanamrut manuscript

In addition to Swaminarayan's acceptance of perennial Hindu texts such as the four Vedas, Vedanta-sutras, and the Bhagavad Gita, Swaminarayan encouraged the creation of a scriptural tradition specific to the Swaminarayan Sampradaya, as part of the institutionalization of his charisma. Along with theological texts with revelatory status, the genres of textual production in the Swaminarayan Sampradaya include sacred biographies, ethical precepts, commentaries, and philosophical treatises.

=== Vachanamrut ===
The Vachanamrut, literally the 'immortalizing ambrosia in the form of words', is the fundamental text for the Swaminarayan Sampradaya, containing Swaminarayan's interpretations of the classical Hindu texts. The text is a compilation of 273 discourses, with each discourse within the collection also called a Vachanamrut. Swaminarayan delivered these discourses in Gujarati between the years of 1819–1829, and his senior disciples noted his teachings while they were delivered and compiled them during Swaminarayan's lifetime. In this scripture, Swaminarayan gives his interpretation of the classical Hindu texts, which includes five eternal entities: jiva, ishwar, maya, Aksharbrahman, Parabrahman. He also describes the ultimate goal of life, moksha (mokṣa), a spiritual state of ultimate liberation from the cycle of births and deaths and characterized by eternal bliss and devotion to God. To attain this state, Swaminarayan states that the jiva needs to follow the four-fold practice of ekantik dharma (Note: See Sahajānanda 2015: Sarangpur 11.) to transcend maya (Note: See Sahajānanda 2015: Gadhada III-39.) and become brahmarup and reside in the service of God.

As followers believe Swaminarayan to be God, the Vachanamrut is considered a direct revelation of God and thus the most precise interpretation of the Upanishads, Bhagavad Gita, and other important Hindu scriptures. This scripture is read by followers regularly and discourses are conducted daily in Swaminarayan temples around the world.

=== Shikshapatri ===
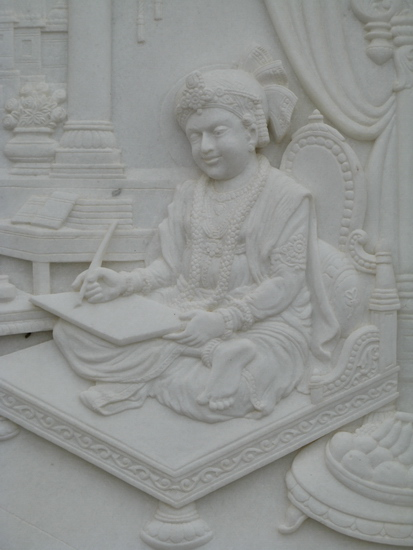
An illustration of Swaminarayan writing the Shiskhapatri

The Shikshapatri is a composition of 212 Sanskrit verses believed to be authored by Swaminarayan and completed in 1826. As an 'epistle of precepts,' the verses primarily communicate the Swaminarayan Sampradaya's moral injunctions for devotees which should be read daily. (Note: See Sahajānanda 2015: Gadhada III I-14) Swaminarayan states that the Shikshapatri is not merely his words but his personified form and merits worship in its own right.

=== Sacred biographies ===
The Swaminarayan Sampradaya has produced voluminous biographical literature on Swaminarayan. The Satsangi Jivan, a five volume Sanskrit sacred biography of Swaminarayan, consists of 17,627 verses written by Shatananda Muni that also incorporates some of Swaminarayan's teachings. The Bhaktachintamani is a sacred biography of Swaminarayan composed by Nishkulanand Swami. Consisting of 8,536 couplets, this biography serves as a record of Swaminarayan's life and teachings. The Harililamrut is a longer biographical text in verse written by Dalpatram and published in 1907. The Harilila Kalpataru a 33,000-verse Sanskrit biographical text, was written by Achintyanand Brahmachari, at the suggestion of Gunatitanand Swami. These and many other sacred biographies complement the theological texts, insofar as their incidents serve as practical applications of the theology.

=== Swamini Vato ===
The Swamini Vato is a compilation of teachings delivered by Gunatitanand Swami over the course of his forty-year ministry, which is valued by the BAPS. He was one of Swaminarayan's foremost disciple, and according to the BAPS and some denominations of the Swaminarayan Sampradaya, he was the first manifestation of Swaminarayan in a lineage of Aksharbrahman Gurus. Similarly to the Vachanamrut, Gunatitanand Swami's followers recorded his teachings, which were compiled in his lifetime and reviewed by Gunatitanand Swami himself. These teachings were first published by Balmukund Swami in 5 chapters and then 7 chapters by Krishnaji Ada. The text consists of approximately 1,478 excerpts taken from Gunatitanand Swami's sermons. In his teachings, he reflects on the nature of human experience and offers thoughts on how one ought to frame the intentions with which they act in this world, while also elaborating on Swaminarayan's supremacy, the importance of the sadhu, and the means for attaining liberation. Often, Gunatitanand Swami elaborates upon topics or passages from the Vachanamrut, which lends the text to be considered a 'natural commentary' on the Vachanamrut within the Swaminarayan Sampradaya. In addition, he often made references to other Hindu texts, parables, and occurrences in daily life in order not only to explain spiritual concepts, but also to provide guidance on how to live them.

=== Vedanta commentaries ===
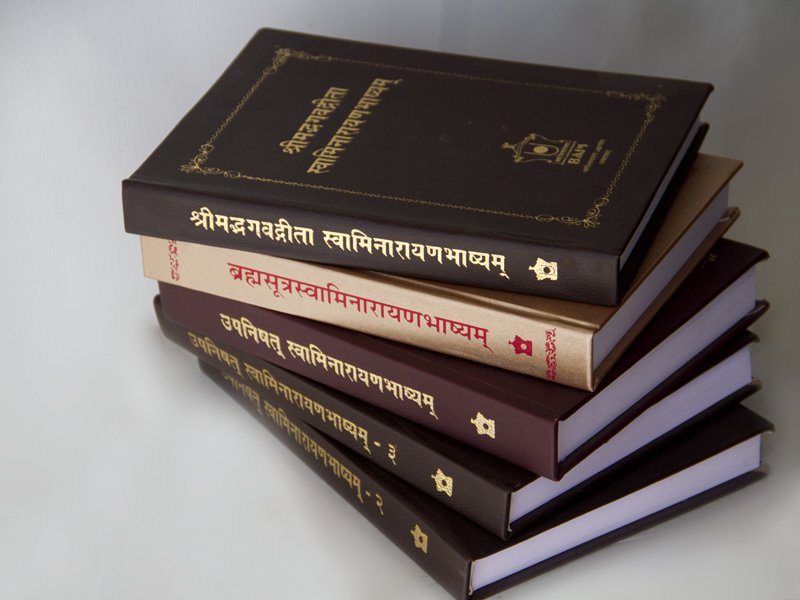
Swaminarayan Bhashyam

==== Early commentaries ====
From its early history, the Swaminarayan Sampradaya has also been involved in the practice of producing Sanskrit commentarial work as a way of engaging with the broader scholastic community. The classical Vedanta school of philosophy and theology is of particular import for the Swaminarayan Sampradaya, which has produced exegetical work on the three canonical Vedanta texts—the Upanishads, Brahmasutras, and the Bhagavad Gita. While Swaminarayan himself did not author a commentary on these texts, he engaged with them and their interpretations in the Vachanamrut. The earliest Vedanta commentarial literature in the Swaminarayan Sampradaya reflects a heavy dependence on the Vedanta systems of Ramanuja and Vallabha. Although authorship of these nineteenth-century and early twentieth-century texts are attributed to two of Swaminarayan's eminent disciples, Muktanand Swami and Gopalanand Swami,

==== Swaminarayan Bhashyam ====
The most comprehensive commentarial work on Vedanta in the Swaminarayan Sampradaya is the Swaminarayan Bhashyam authored by Bhadreshdas Swami, an ordained monk of BAPS. It is a five-volume work written in Sanskrit and published between 2009 and 2012. The format and style of exegesis and argument conform with the classical tradition of Vedanta commentarial writing. In more than two thousand pages, the commentator Bhadreshdas Swami, offers detailed interpretations of the principal ten Upanishads, the Bhagavad Gita, and the Brahmasutras (Vedanta Sutras) that articulate Swaminarayan's ideas and interpretations.

The Swaminarayan Bhashyam has led to some recognition for Swaminarayan's Akshar-Purushottam distinction as a distinct view within Vedanta. The Shri Kashi Vidvat Parishad, an authoritative council of scholars of Vedic dharma and philosophy throughout India, stated in a meeting in Varanasi on 31 July 2017 that it is "appropriate to identify Sri Svāminārāyaṇa's Vedānta by the title: Akṣarapuruṣottama Darśana," (Note: "Within philosophy, just as Śrī Śaṅkara's Vedānta is identified as the Advaita Darśana, Śrī Rāmānuja's Vedānta is identified as the Viśiṣṭādvaita Darśana, Śrī Madhva's Vedānta is identified as the Dvaita Darśana, Śrī Vallabha's Vedānta is identified as the Śuddhādvaita Darśana, and others are respectively known; it is in every way appropriate to identify Sri Svāminārāyaṇa's Vedānta by the title: Akṣara-Puruṣottama Darśana.") and that his siddhanta ("view," "doctrine") on the Akshar-Purushottam distinction is "distinct from Advaita, Viśiṣṭādvaita, and all other doctrines." (Note: BAPS Swaminarayan Sanstha, Acclamation by th Sri Kasi Vidvat Parisad) Swaminarayan's Akshar-Purushottam darshan was also acclaimed as a distinct view within Vedanta in 2018 by professor Ashok Aklujkar, at the 17th World Sanskrit Conference, stating that the Swaminarayan Bhashyam "very clearly and effectively explains that Akshar is distinct from Purushottam." (Note: "Professor Ashok Aklujkar said [...] Just as the Kashi Vidvat Parishad acknowledged Swaminarayan Bhagwan's Akshar-Purushottam Darshan as a distinct darshan in the Vedanta tradition, we are honored to do the same from the platform of the World Sanskrit Conference [...] Professor George Cardona [said] "This is a very important classical Sanskrit commentary that very clearly and effectively explains that Akshar is distinct from Purushottam.")

== Influence on society ==
=== Humanitarian Service ===
In addition to his efforts in social reform, Swaminarayan was instrumental in providing humanitarian aid to the people of Gujarat during turbulent times of famine. When given the opportunity to receive two boons from his guru, Swaminarayan asked to receive any miseries destined for followers and to bear any scarcities of food or clothing in place of any followers. In the initial years of the sampradaya, Swaminaryan maintained almshouses throughout Gujarat and directed swamis to maintain the almshouses even under the threat of physical injury by opponents. During a particularly harsh famine in 1813–14, Swaminarayan himself collected and distributed grains to those who were suffering, and he had step wells and water reservoirs dug in various villages. He codified devotees' engagement with humanitarian service in the Shikshapatri, instructing followers to help the poor and those in need during natural disasters, to establish schools, and to serve the ill, according to their ability.

Consequently, various denominations of the Swaminarayan Sampradaya currently engage in humanitarian service at a global scale. ISSO Seva, a subsidiary of the Ahmedabad diocese, is involved in disaster relief, food and blood donation drives in the United States and providing accessible healthcare in Africa. BAPS Charities, a humanitarian services wing of the Baps, engages in medical, educational, and disaster relief efforts. The Gunatit Samaj also hosts medical camps, provides educational services, healthcare, and other social services in India. The Swaminarayan Gadi (Maninagar) diocese primarily hosts health camps and other social services in the UK, Africa and North America. SVG Charity, a subsidiary of the Laxmi Narayan Dev Gadi, is involved in disaster relief, food and medicine donations, blood drives, and organ donation registration drives across the United States, Europe, Canada, and India.

=== Caste ===
During Swaminarayan's time, the oppressive nature of caste-based customs, like endogamy, dress codes, and commensality, pervaded many aspects of society. Religious groups and other institutions often regulated membership based on caste, and Swaminarayan too supported the caste system. According to Williams, caste distinctions and inconsistencies between caste theory and practice still exist within the Swaminarayan sampraday.

Dalits or the former untouchables were banned from Swaminarayan temples from the beginning of certain sects. There was however one case a separate temple being built at Chhani near Vadodra for the dalits. After the Indian Independence in 1947, in order to be exempted from the Bombay Harijan Temple Entry Act of November 1947, which made it illegal for any temple to bar its doors to the previously outcaste communities, the Nar Narayan diocese went to court to claim that they were not 'Hindus', but members of an entirely different religion. Since the sect was not "Hindu", they argued that the Temple Entry Act did not apply to them. The sect did win the case in 1951, which was later overturned by the Indian Supreme court. (Note: Hindu Trust, Accused of Labour Violations in US, Once Filed Case Against Temple Entry for Dalits, The Wire, 13 may 2021)

Swaminarayan demanded a vow from his followers that they would not accept food from members of lower castes, and explicated this in the Shikshapatri, in which Swaminarayan states that his followers should follow rules of the caste system when consuming food and water:

None shall receive food and water, which are unacceptable at the hands of some people under scruples of caste system, may the same happen to the sanctified portions of the Shri Krishna, except at Jagannath Puri."

BAPS-member Parikh attributes this statement to "deep-rooted rigidities of age-old varna-stratied society," and speculates that "Possibly, Swaminarayan sought to subtly subvert and thereby undermine the traditional social order instead of negating it outright through such prescriptions."

BAPS-sadhu Mangalnidhidas acknowledges that Swaminarayan accepted the caste system, which according to Mangalnidhidas may have been "a strategic accommodation to the entrenched traditions of the various elements in Hindu society," but acknowledging that this may have had "unintended negative consequences such as the reinforcement of caste identities." Mangalnidhidas states that, in the early years of the Swaminarayan Sampradaya, high-caste Hindus criticized Swaminarayan for his teachings, inclusiveness, and practices that undermined caste-based discrimination, (Note: According to Kishorelal Mashruwala, a Gandhian scholar cited by Mangalnidhidas, "Swaminarayan was the first to bring about religious advancement of Shudras in Gujarat and Kathiawad region [...] And that became the main reason for many to oppose the Sampraday." Mangalnidhidas further refers to an 1823 memorandum from a British official in the Asiatic Journal notes that the native upper classes "regret (as Hindus) the levelling nature of [Swaminarayan's] system," accepting people from all castes into the sampradaya, and also Muslims and tribal peoples, resulting in their violent opposition to and frequent merciless beatings of Swaminarayan's disciples. Additionally, various historical sources indicate that Swaminarayan himself often ignored caste rules and urged his followers to do the same. Numerous historical accounts show that in practice Swaminarayan himself and his followers shared food and openly interacted with everyone without discrimination.) and argues that, overall, Swaminarayan's followers, practices and teachings helped reduce the oppressive nature of caste-based customs prevalent in that era and drew individuals of lower strata towards the Swaminarayan sampraday.

== See also ==
- List of 21st-century religious leaders

== Sources ==
Printed sources

- Beckerlegge, Gwilym (2006). Swami Vivekananda's Legacy of Service: A Study of the Ramakrishna Math and Mission. Oxford University Press. ISBN 978-0-19-567388-3.
- Beckerlegge, Gwilym (2008), Colonialism, Modernity, and Religious Identities: Religious Reform Movements in South Asia, Oxford University Press
- Bhadreshdas, Sadhu; Aksharananddas, Sadhu (1 April 2016), "Swaminarayan's Brahmajnana as Aksarabrahma-Parabrahma-Darsanam", Swaminarayan Hinduism, Oxford University Press, doi:10.1093/acprof:oso/9780199463749.003.0011, ISBN 978-0-19-946374-9
- Bhadreshdas, Sadhu (2018). "Parabrahman Swaminarayan's Akshara-Purushottama Darshana". Journal of the BAPS Swaminarayan Research Institute. 1.
- Bhatt, Kalpesh (2016). "Daily pūjā: moralizing dharma in the BAPS Swaminarayan Hindu tradition". Nidan: International Journal for Indian Studies: 88–109.
- Brahmbhatt, Arun (2016). "BAPS Swaminarayan community: Hinduism". In Cherry, Stephen M.; Ebaugh, Helen Rose (eds.). Global religious movements across borders: sacred service. Burlington: Routledge. ISBN 978-1-4094-5689-6. OCLC 872618204.
- Brahmbhatt, Arun (2016b). "The Swaminarayan commentarial tradition". In Williams, Raymond Brady; Trivedi, Yogi (eds.). Swaminarayan Hinduism: tradition, adaptation and identity (1st ed.). New Delhi, India: Oxford University Press. ISBN 978-0-19-908657-3. OCLC 948338914.
- Brahmbhatt, Arun (2018), Scholastic Publics: Sanskrit textual practices in Gujarat, 1800-Present. PhD diss., University of Toronto (PDF)
- Brear, Douglas (1996). Williams, Raymond Brady (ed.). Transmission of a Swaminarayan Hindu scripture in the British East Midlands (Columbia University Press ed.). New York: Columbia University Press. ISBN 0-231-10779-X. OCLC 34984234.
- Brewer, E. Cobham (2009). Rockwood, Camilla (ed.). Brewer's Dictionary of Phrase and Fable. London: Chambers Harrap. "Swami" entry. ISBN 9780550104113. OL 2527037W.
- Burman, J. J. Roy (2005). Gujarat Unknown. Mittal Publications. ISBN 9788183240529.
- Changela, Hitesh (n.d.), The Supreme Godhead Bhagawan Swaminarayan: Bhagawan Swaminarayan Jivan Darshan, Shree Swaminarayan Gurukul Rajkot Sansthan
- Dani, Gunvant (1980). Bhagwan Swaminarayan, a social reformer. Bochasanwasi Shri Aksharpurushottam Sanstha. OCLC 500188660.
- Dave, Harshad (2004). Bhagwan Shri Swaminarayan - Part 1. Ahmedabad: Swaminarayan Aksharpith. ISBN 81-7526-211-7.
- Dave, Jyotindra (2018). "The tradition of education within the Swaminarayan Sampraday". Journal of the BAPS Swaminarayan Research Institute. 1.
- Dwyer, Rachel (2018), "The Swaminarayan Movement", in Jacobsen, Knut A.; Kumar, Pratap (eds.), South Asians in the Diaspora: Histories and Religious Traditions, BRILL, ISBN 9789047401407
- Cush, Denise (2008). Encyclopedia of Hinduism. Robinson, Catherine A., York, Michael. London: Routledge. ISBN 978-0-7007-1267-0. OCLC 62133001.
- Gadhia, Smit (2016). "Akshara and its four forms in Swaminarayan's doctrine". In Williams, Raymond Brady; Trivedi, Yogi (eds.). Swaminarayan Hinduism: tradition, adaptation and identity (1st ed.). New Delhi, India: Oxford University Press. ISBN 978-0-19-908657-3. OCLC 948338914.
- Hardiman, David (1988). "Class Base of Swaminarayan Sect". Economic and Political Weekly. 23 (37): 1907–1912. ISSN 0012-9976. JSTOR 4379024.
- Hatcher, Brian (2020). Hinduism before reform. Cambridge, Massachusetts: Harvard University Press. ISBN 978-0-674-24713-0. OCLC 1138500516.
- Heber, Reginald (1828). Narrative Of A Journey Through The Upper Provinces Of India, From Calcutta To Bombay, 1824-1825, (With Notes Upon Ceylon) : An Account Of A Journey Tto Madras And The Southern Provinces, 1826, And Letters Written In India; In Three Volumes. Gilbert. OCLC 554124407.
- Herman, Phyllis K. (2010), "Seeing the divine through windows: online puja and virtual religious experience", Online: Heidelberg Journal of Religions on the Internet, 4 (1)
- Jones, Constance A.; Ryan, James D. (2007). "Swaminarayan movement". Encyclopedia of Hinduism. Encyclopedia of World Religions. J. Gordon Melton, Series Editor. New York: Facts On File. pp. 429–431. ISBN 978-0-8160-5458-9. Archived from the original on 2 April 2020.
- Kim, Hanna Hea-Sun (2001). Being Swaminarayan: the ontology and significance of belief in the construction of a Gujarati diaspora (PhD thesis, Columbia University). Ann Arbor, Mi: UMI Dissertation Services. OCLC 452027310.
- Kim, Hanna H. (2005), "Swaminarayan Movement", in Jones, Lindsay (ed.), Encyclopedia of Religion: 15-Volume Set, vol. 13 (2nd ed.), Detroit, Mi: MacMillan Reference USA, ISBN 0-02-865735-7, archived from the original on 29 December 2020 – via Encyclopedia.com
- Kim, Hanna (2007). "Edifice complex: Swaminarayan bodies and buildings in the diaspora". Gujaratis in the West: evolving identities in contemporary society. Mukadam, Anjoom A., Mawani, Sharmina. Newcastle, UK: Cambridge Scholars Pub. ISBN 978-1-84718-368-2. OCLC 233491089.
- Kim, Hanna H. (2010), Public Engagement and Personal Desires: BAPS Swaminarayan Temples and their Contribution to the Discourses on Religion, Anthropology Faculty Publications
- Kim, Hanna (2011). "Steeples and spires: exploring the materiality of built and unbuilt temples". Nidan: International Journal for the Study of Hinduism. 23.
- Kim, Hanna (2012). "Chapter 30. The BAPS Swaminarayan Temple Organisation and Its Publics". In Zavos, John; et al. (eds.). Public Hinduisms. New Delhi: SAGE Publ. India. ISBN 978-81-321-1696-7.
- Kim, Hanna (2013). "Devotional expressions in the Swaminarayan community". In Kumar, P. Pratap (ed.). Contemporary Hinduism. Durham, UK: Acumen. ISBN 978-1-84465-690-5. OCLC 824353503.
- Kim, Hanna (2014). "Svāminārāyaṇa: Bhaktiyoga and the Akṣarabrahman Guru". In Singleton, Mark; Goldberg, Ellen (eds.). Gurus of modern yoga. New York: Oxford University Press. ISBN 978-0-19-993871-1. OCLC 861692270.
- Kim, Hanna (2016). "Thinking through Akshardham and the making of the Swaminarayan self". In Williams, Raymond Brady; Trivedi, Yogi (eds.). Swaminarayan Hinduism: tradition, adaptation and identity (1st ed.). New Delhi, India: Oxford University Press. ISBN 978-0-19-908657-3. OCLC 948338914.
- Kurien, Prerna (2007). A place at the multicultural table: the development of an American Hinduism. Piscataway: Rutgers University Press. ISBN 978-0-8135-4161-7. OCLC 476118265.
- Lagassé, Paul (2013). "Dharma". The Columbia encyclopedia (6th ed.). New York: Columbia University Press. ISBN 978-0-7876-5015-5. OCLC 43599122.
- Mamtora, Bhakti (2018), "BAPS: Pramukh Swami", in Jacobsen, Knut A.; et al. (eds.), Brill's Encyclopedia of Hinduism Online
- Mamtora, Bhakti (2019), The making of a modern scripture: Svāmīnī Vāto and the formation of religious subjectivities in Gujarat. PhD diss., University of Florida
- Mangalnidhidas, Sadhu (2016). "Sahajanand Swami's approach to caste". In Williams, Raymond Brady; Trivedi, Yogi (eds.). Swaminarayan Hinduism: tradition, adaptation and identity (1st ed.). New Delhi, India: Oxford University Press. ISBN 978-0-19-908657-3. OCLC 948338914.
- Mashruwala, Kishore (1940). Sahajanand Swami and Swaminarayan Sampradaya (2 ed.). Ahmedabad: Navajivan Publishing House.
- Mosher, Lucinda Allen. (2006). Praying. New York, N.Y.: Seabury Books. ISBN 1-59627-016-0. OCLC 63048497.
- N.A. (1823). "Indian Sect: Memorandum Respecting a Sect Lately Introduced by a Person Calling Himself Swamee Naraen". The Asiatic Journal and Monthly Register for British India and Its Dependencies. XV. Kingsbury, Parbury and Allen: 348–349.
- Narayan, Kirin (1992). Storytellers, saints and scoundrels : folk narrative in Hindu religious teaching. New Delhi: Motilal Banarsidass. ISBN 8120808908. OCLC 320229511.
- Packert, Cynthia (2016). "Early Swaminarayan iconography and its relationship to Vaishnavism". In Williams, Raymond Williams; Trivedi, Yogi (eds.). Swaminarayan Hinduism: tradition, adaptation and identity (1st ed.). New Delhi, India: Oxford University Press. ISBN 978-0-19-908657-3. OCLC 948338914.
- Packert, Cynthia (2019). "From Gujarat to the globe: 'Bhakti visuality' and identity in BAPS Svāminārāyaṇ Hinduism". International Journal of Hindu Studies. 12 (2): 192–223. doi:10.1093/jhs/hiz013.
- Paramtattvadas, Sadhu; Williams, Raymond (2016). "Swaminarayan and British Contacts in Gujarat in the 1820s". In Williams, Raymond; Trivedi, Yogi (eds.). Swaminarayan Hinduism. Oxford University Press.
- Paramtattvadas, Swami (2017). An introduction to Swaminarayan Hindu theology. Cambridge, United Kingdom: Cambridge University Press. ISBN 978-1-107-15867-2. OCLC 964861190.
- Paramtattvadas, Swami (2019). "Akshar-Purushottam School of Vedanta". Hinduism Today. October/November/December 2019: 36–53.
- Parekh, Manilal Chhotala (1936). Sri Swami Narayana a gospel of Bhagwat-dharma or God in redemptive action. Sri Bhagwat-Dharma Mission House (Harmony House). OCLC 1073620532.
- Parikh, Vibhuti (1 April 2016), "The Swaminarayan Ideology and Kolis in Gujarat", in Williams, Raymond Brady; Trivedi, Yogi (eds.), Swaminarayan Hinduism, Oxford University Press, pp. 94–114, doi:10.1093/acprof:oso/9780199463749.003.0006, ISBN 978-0-19-946374-9
- Patel, Arti (2018). "Secular conflict: challenges in the construction of the Chino Hills BAPS Swaminarayan temple". Nidan: International Journal for Indian Studies. 3: 55–72.
- Patel, Iva (2018), "Swaminarayan", in Jain, Pankaj; Sherma, Rita; Khanna, Madhu (eds.), Hinduism and Tribal Religions, Encyclopedia of Indian Religions, Dordrecht: Springer Netherlands, pp. 1–6, doi:10.1007/978-94-024-1036-5_541-1, ISBN 978-94-024-1036-5
- Patel, Shruti (2017). "Beyond the Lens of Reform: Religious Culture in Modern Gujarat". The Journal of Hindu Studies. 10: 47–85. doi:10.1093/jhs/hix005.
- Rajpurohit, Dalpat (2016). "Brahmanand and his innovations in the Barahmasa genre". In Williams, Raymond Brady; Trivedi, Yogi (eds.). Swaminarayan Hinduism: tradition, adaptation and identity (1st ed.). New Delhi, India: Oxford University Press. ISBN 978-0-19-908657-3. OCLC 948338914.
- Rinehart, Robin (2004). Contemporary Hinduism: ritual, culture, and practice. Santa Barbara, Calif.: ABC-CLIO. ISBN 1-57607-906-6. OCLC 56558699.
- Sahajānanda, Swami (2015), The Vachanāmrut: spiritual discourses of Bhagwān Swāminārāyan (3rd ed.), Ahmedabad: Bochasanvasi Shri Aksharpurushottama Sanstha, ISBN 978-81-7526-431-1
- Schreiner, Peter (2001), "Institutionalization of Charisma: The Case of Sahajananda", in Dalmia, Vasudha; Malinar, Angelika; Christof, Martin (eds.), Charisma and canon : Essays on the Religious History of the Indian Subcontinent, Oxford University Press
- Tripathy, Preeti (2010). Indian religions: tradition, history and culture. New Delhi, India: Axis Publications. ISBN 978-93-80376-17-2. OCLC 436980135.
- Trivedi (2015). Bhagwan Swaminarayan: the story of his life (2nd ed.). Ahmedabad: Swaminarayan Aksharpith. ISBN 978-81-7526-594-3. OCLC 957581656.
- Trivedi, Yogi (2016). "Multivalent Krishna-bhakti in Premanand's Poetry". In Williams, Raymond Brady (ed.). Swaminarayan Hinduism: tradition, adaptation and identity (1st ed.). New Delhi, India: Oxford University Press. ISBN 978-0-19-908657-3. OCLC 948338914.
- Trivedi, Yogi (2016b). "Introduction to theology and literature". In Williams, Raymond Brady; Trivedi, Yogi (eds.). Swaminarayan Hinduism: tradition, adaptation and identity (1st ed.). New Delhi, India: Oxford University Press. ISBN 978-0-19-908657-3. OCLC 948338914.
- Vasavada, Rabindra (2016). "Swaminarayan temple building". In Williams, Raymond Williams; Trivedi, Yogi (eds.). Swaminarayan Hinduism: tradition, adaptation and identity (1st ed.). New Delhi, India: Oxford University Press. ISBN 978-0-19-908657-3. OCLC 948338914.
- Vivekjivandas, Sadhu (2016). "Transnational growth of BAPS in East Africa". In Williams, Raymond Brady; Trivedi, Yogi (eds.). Swaminarayan Hinduism: tradition, adaptation and identity. Patel, Mahendra; Iswarcharandas, Sadhu (1st ed.). New Delhi, India: Oxford University Press. ISBN 978-0-19-908657-3. OCLC 948338914.
- Warrier, Maya (2012). "Traditions and Transformations". In Zavos, John; et al. (eds.). Public Hinduisms. New Delhi: SAGE. ISBN 978-81-321-1696-7. OCLC 808609622.
- Williams, Raymond Brady (1984). A new face of Hinduism: the Swaminarayan religion. Cambridge [Cambridgeshire]: Cambridge University Press. ISBN 0-521-25454-X. OCLC 9442462.
- Williams, Raymond Brady (1998). "Training religious specialists for a transnational Hinduism: A Swaminarayan sadhu training center". Journal of the American Academy of Religion. 66 (4): 841–862. doi:10.1093/jaarel/66.4.841.
- Williams, Raimond Brady (2006). "Swaminarayan Hinduism". In Clarke, Peter B. (ed.). Encyclopedia of new religious movements. London; New York: Routledge. pp. 609–611. ISBN 9-78-0-415-26707-6.
- Williams, Raymond Brady (2016). "Introduction". In Williams, Raymond Brady; Trivedi, Yogi (eds.). Swaminarayan Hinduism: tradition, adaptation and identity (1st ed.). New Delhi, India: Oxford University Press. ISBN 978-0-19-908657-3. OCLC 948338914.
- Williams, Raymond Brady (2018). An introduction to Swaminarayan Hinduism (Third ed.). Cambridge, United Kingdom: Cambridge University Press. ISBN 978-1-108-42114-0. OCLC 1038043717.
- Williams (2018b). "Bochasanwasi Shri Akshar Purushottam Swaminarayan Sanstha". Brill's Encyclopedia of Hinduism. Vol. 5. doi:10.1163/1234-5678_beh_com_9000000232.
- Williams, Raymond Brady (2019). An introduction to Swaminarayan Hinduism (Third (paperback) ed.). Cambridge, United Kingdom: Cambridge University Press. ISBN 978-1-108-43151-4. OCLC 1038043717.

Web-sources
