= Swaminarayan Mandir Vasna Sanstha =

Hindu denomination

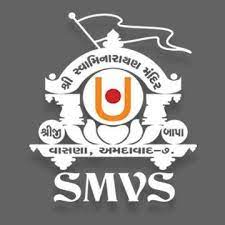
- Abbreviation: SMVS
- Formation: 22 February 1987 (39 years ago)
- Founder: HDH Gurudev Bapji
- Type: Religious organization
- Legal status: Foundation
- Purpose: Educational, Philanthropic, Religious studies, Spirituality
- Headquarters: Gandhinagar, Gujarat, India
- Coordinates: 23.181556°N 72.640167°E
- Region served: Worldwide
- Guru: HDH Swamishri
- Website: www.smvs.org www.hdhbapji.org

Swaminarayan Mandir Vasna Sanstha (SMVS) is a Hindu denomination within the Swaminarayan Sampradaya. It was founded in 1987 by Devnandandasji Swami, usually addressed as HDH Bapji by his devotees and followers, It propagates the preaching and teaching of Swaminarayan as explained by Jivanpran Abajibapashri. Multifaceted activities in areas like social, cultural, educational, religious fields are carried out by SMVS under the directions and guidance of Bapji and his second in-command and current Guru Satyasankalpdasji Swami, who is usually addressed as HDH Swamishri.

From a modest beginning in 1987, SMVS has developed into a multifaceted institution. SMVS has 100 main centres throughout Gujarat and abroad, wherein 100 saints, 100 lady saints, and about 10,000 volunteers are entrusted religious duties. Many of their saints and devotees have visited India, UK, USA, Canada, Australia, New Zealand, Kenya, Uganda, Zambia, Bahrain, Kuwait, Dubai, and other parts of the world to propagate preaching and teaching of Sahajanand Swami and also to monitor construction and expansion of SMVS Swaminarayan temples as well as other related religious and cultural activities such as functioning of medical centres, old age homes, schools, hospitals, and other charities. SMVS operates in the educational field, medical-health services, tribal upliftment, natural calamities, etc. through SMVS Charities, a separate non-profit aid organization which has spearheaded a number of projects.

== Works ==
=== Mandir ===
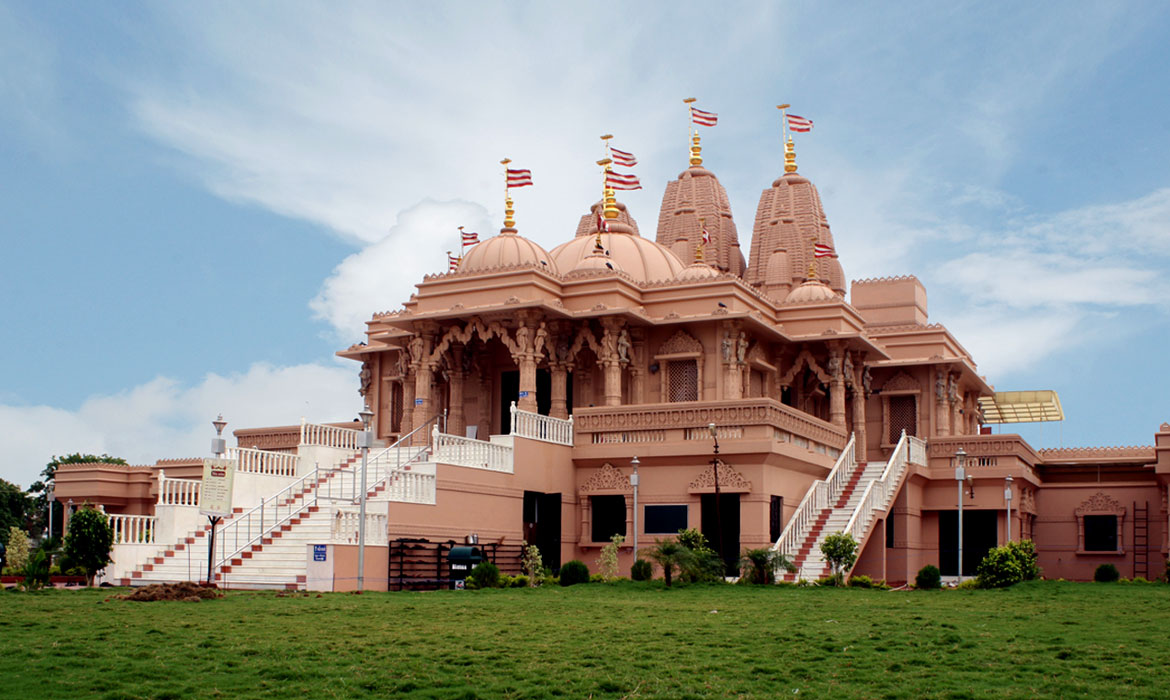
SMVS Temple

A temple shows the spiritual and social path and so it is an important aspect of the Swaminarayan sect. Thus, by speeding up temple construction projects, SMVS is not only helping the betterment of society but also, is playing an important role in spreading the principles and values of the Swaminarayan sect.

The unique feature of SMVS temples is that they exhibit theology as per the divine wish of Bhagwan Swaminarayan. Idols are only of Bhagwan Swaminarayan Himself and his muktas are instilled in these temples.

With the divine inspiration of HDH Bapji, the organization has built more than 80 temples in the different states of India and abroad. Shortly, hundreds of pieces of land will be acquired for the construction of temples in every state of India and every district of Gujarat and taluka thereof. Swaminarayan Mandir Vasna Sanstha they have many temples in India and in USA.

=== Sadhu ===
Saints are the only part of society that spends their entire lives leaving their aspirations, hopes, and desires for the noble purpose of their spiritual advancement as well as the upliftment of society. SMVS has set sail on the path of asceticism, inspiring many youths. SMVS has given a gift to the society of 100 saints and parshads. Though saints are inseparable from society, they are separate from worldly desires. To teach the preachings of Lord Swaminarayan, about saints, ideals, values, and limitations set for the saints by Bhagwan Swaminarayan; HDH Bapji has started a 'Samarpit Training Centre' (STK) at Swaminarayan Dham, Gandhinagar, the headquarters of the organization.

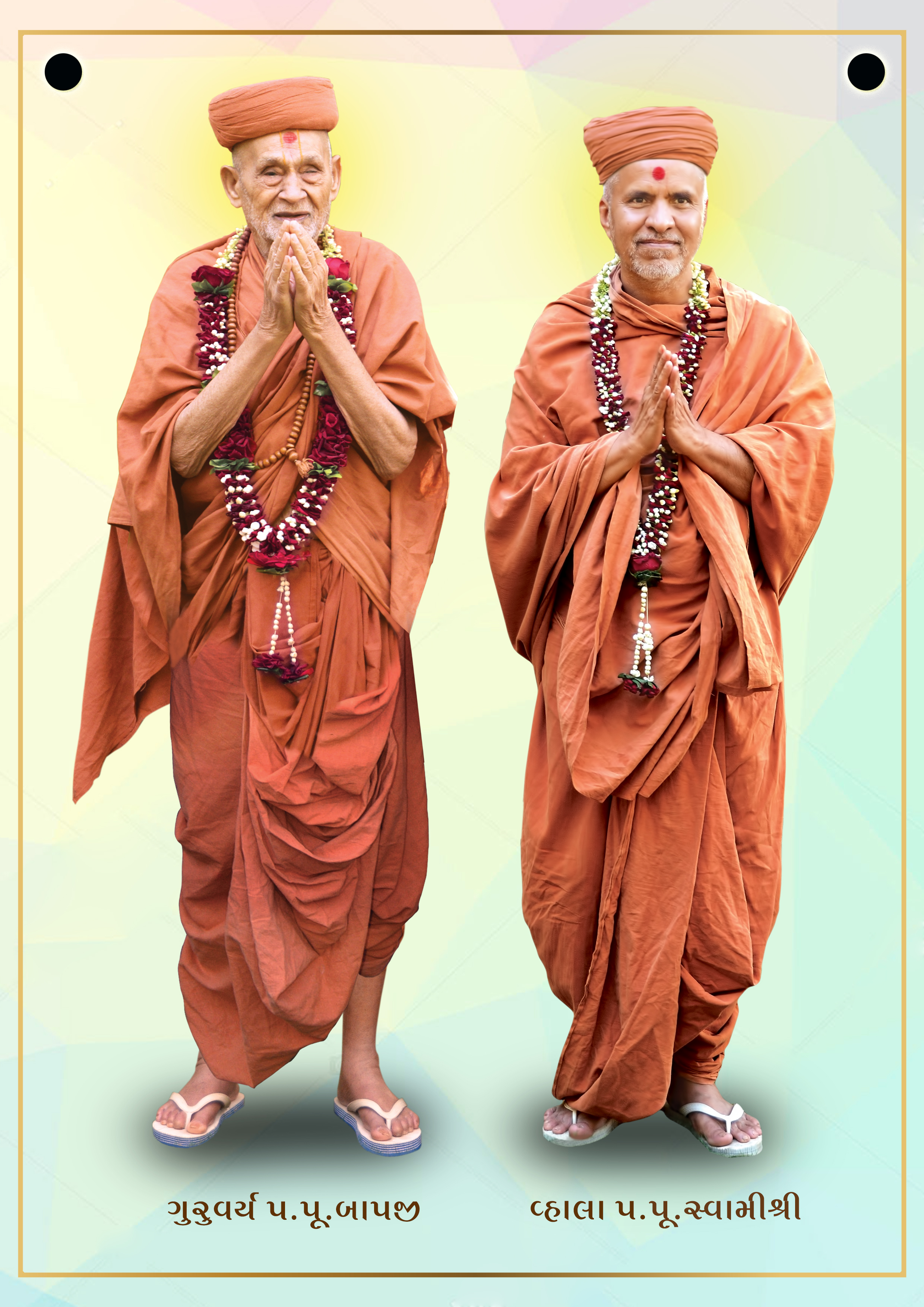
HDH Bapji And Swamishri

=== Children development ===
With the inspiration of HDH Bapji, SMVS's Swaminarayan Digvijay group has initiated children activities since 1987, taking care of the all-around development of children. These activities help to instill religious culture, traditional culture, and basic values. It also helps to develop life skills, education, creative skills and so many other aspects for the all-round development of children. Under the guidance of Satsang Pravruti Karyalaya (The Children's Activity Board of SMVS), there are currently 633 active (Boys) bal assemblies around the world for children between the ages of 7–14 years. More than 15,000 children from these groups attend children assembly (bal sabha) every week.

=== Youth development ===
SMVS has initiated Kishor-Yuvak Mandal (youth groups) from 1987 under the Swaminarayan Digvijay Mandal, who are engaged in instilling all-rounded development, giving guidance, and transforming the youth. These youth groups cultivate, spiritual values such as simple living, observing basic conduct of religion, worshipping Bhagwan Swaminarayan, learning to lead an austere life. Social values such as character, honesty, ethics, and politeness are also being taught. Overall, more than 226 youth and elder groups are active across India. Globally there are more than 30 youth groups maintained. Overall, more than 10,000 youths attend youth assembly (Yuvak Sabha) every week.

=== Satsang assemblies ===
There are more than 20,000 spiritual assemblies are conducted every year by saints of SMVS in which thousands of followers acquire religious knowledge. Apart from this, saints arrange personal preaching by more than 50,000 in-home visits (Padhramni) and Maha puja ceremonies.

=== Volunteers ===
SMVS volunteer force has been altruistically serving as a troop in mass relief work and at major festivals. By the inspiration of HDH Bapji, the volunteers of SMVS have been doing laudable service under the leadership of the saints. The force of 10,000 volunteers is always ready and equipped on the command of HDH Bapji for relief programs and upliftment of society. This force desires to help society in every way possible.

=== Educational services ===
SMVS had built divine gurukul to take care of education and culture.

In June 2002, this gurukul was inaugurated. Similarly, in 2011, SMVS inaugurated ‘Swaminarayan Dham Girls Gurukul. Moreover, SMVS established three educational institutes in Ahmedabad and Gandhinagar.

Today, the rapid rise in the fees of educational institutions; the SMVS organization has lent them a helping hand and provided funding for education to such students in desperate need. For the past five years, the educational aid service programme has made immense contributions to the education of students in desperate need. The SMVS organization is donating aids of more than twenty-five lakhs towards the educational sector and for necessary stationery needs.

=== Medical services ===
To medical services SMVS launched the 'SMVS Swaminarayan Hospital The hospital has been prepared at a cost of more than eight hundred million rupees.

In the first 6 months of the hospital, more than 40,472 patients were treated.

SMVS had opened the 'Shriji-Bapa Medical Centre' which was opened for social service at Vasna, Ahmedabad in 1996. With its laudable service, more than 5 such medical centres have been opened in Ahmedabad, Gujarat

=== Festivals for cultural, moral & spiritual values ===
SMVS has held Grand Festivals and Celebrations
Grand Festivals	Year	Visitor
Bhagwan Swaminarayan Dwishatabdi Mahotsav	1981	4500
Ghanshyamnagar Dashabdi Utsav	1984	9000
Jivanpran Abjibapashree Sardh Shatabdi Mahotsav	1993	390,000
Jivanpran Abjibapashree Mahotsav	1995	1,800,000
Swaminarayan Mahamantra Dwishatabdi Mahotsav	2001	550,000
Vachanamrut Rahasyarth Bapashree Vani Shatabdi Mahotsav	2006	300,000
SMVS Rajat Gaurav Utsav	2010 - 2012	600,000
SMVS Rajat Jayanti Mahotsav	2012	358,950
Vachanamrut Dwishatabdi Mahotsav	2019	200,000
Virtual Jivanpran Abjibapashree Shatamrut Mahotsav	2020	456,394

=== Tribals development ===
The land of Panchmahal has been overshadowed with poverty for many decades. Due to the lack of literacy, tribal people are entrapped in evil deeds like addiction, delusion, superstition, burglary, and robbery. Upliftment of this community was and remains to be a very difficult task.

In 2005, a large temple was constructed in Godhar (Panchmahal) and thus deep-rooted the place of worship in this region.

Currently, SMVS is conducting many social and spiritual activities in more than 200 villages of the Panchmahal district for tribal upliftment.

=== Relief ===
De-addiction SMVS has inspired de-addiction awareness by conducting de-addiction campaigns for the last three decades.

Environmental care In the famine of 2001, HDH Bapji inspired the organization to care more than 120 taluka centres of Panchmahal and Sabarkantha district of Gujarat. SMVS cared more than 6,971 livestock animals by distributing 232,175-kilogram of fodder and over 194,000 kilograms of cattle food and saved them from famine. Thereafter, by HDH Bapji's inspiration, SMVS joined the ‘Clean India' campaign organized by the Central Indian Government. Saints and more than 5,916 volunteers helped to clean more than 114 public places. The organization has been working on environmental protection through launching plantation campaigns and maintenance of more than 175,000 trees. Similarly, to reduce the ecological footprint of SMVS, many temples have converted to solar power.

Women development According to the system of Swaminarayan sect, the proper limits between men and women should be maintained. SMVS has also taken special care for the female society. By the help of women ascetics, SMVS conducts the spiritual activities of all-female dhun mandals, VCD Satsang centers, etc. To impart spiritual qualities in women's society, there are 339 (girl) balika assemblies, 23 (female youth) kishori assemblies and 50 (women) mahila assemblies running in centres across the country and abroad. In which more than 1500 women and youth volunteers are pursuing this service. At these Digvijay Mandal assemblies, more than 15,000 women and girls are leading spiritual pursuits in their lives.

Bhakti Niwas Bhagwan Swaminarayan initiated a new tradition in which women could also lead an ascetic life and worship God, just like men. For this purpose, Bhagwan Swaminarayan started a new custom of "Sankhya Yogi Behno" (women ascetics).

The SMVS organization has established a separate woman wing in which women can become ascetics just like men. This special unit is called ‘Bhaktiniwas'. Currently, around 83 women ascetics are serving in Bhaktiniwas. They lead a pious life refraining from any worldly pleasures, and propagating the principles of Bhagwan Swaminarayan.

There is a 'Samarpit Training Centre' (STK) for those young women aspiring to become a woman ascetic.
