= Akshara Brahma Yoga =

Eighth chapter of the Bhagavad Gita

- ← Jnana-Vijnana Yoga Raja Vidya Raja Guhya Yoga →
- ‌Om, the sacred symbol described in the chapter

Information
- Religion: Hinduism
- Author: Traditionally attributed to Vyasa
- Language: Sanskrit
- Verses: 28

The Akshara Brahma Yoga (Sanskrit: अक्षरब्रह्मयोग, romanized: Akṣarabrahmayōga) is the eighth of the eighteen chapters of the Bhagavad Gita. The chapter has a total of twenty-eight shlokas. It is the 30th chapter of Bhishma Parva, the sixth book of the Mahabharata.
