= Akshar (Swaminarayan) =

Akshar, "imperishable," "unalterable," "undestroyable," Atman, the one who is unchanging, forever beyond maya, is a term found in Indian Sanskrit scriptures. It is a prominent part of Swaminarayan Sampradaya's theology. It is contrasted with kshara, "destroyable," Prakṛti, bound by maya. Originally, akshar had the meaning of "syllable" in Sanskrit philosophy, but came to mean "first and fundamental principle of the cosmic order."

According to the Bhagavad Gita, Purushottam is explained as above and beyond kshar and akshar purushas or as an omnipotent cosmic being. For example, verses 15.16 and 15.17 of the Bhagavad Gita explain:

There are two types of beings within the world: ‘kshar’ and ‘akshar’. All those bound by maya are kshar, whereas the one who is unchanging – forever beyond maya – is Akshar.
The supreme being is distinct [from kshar and Akshar]. He is called Paramatma. (Note: द्वाविमौ पुरुषौ लोके क्षरश्चाक्षर एव च । क्षरः सर्वाणि भूतानि कूटस्थोऽक्षर उच्यते ।। उत्तमः पुरुषस्त्वन्यः परमात्मेत्युदाहृतः ।।)

== Sources ==
- Paramtattvadas, Sadhu (2017). An introduction to Swaminarayan Hindu theology. Cambridge, United Kingdom: Cambridge University Press. ISBN 9781107158672. OCLC 964861190.
- Williams, Raymond Brady (2018). An introduction to Swaminarayan Hinduism (Third ed.). Cambridge, United Kingdom: Cambridge University Press. ISBN 978-1-108-42114-0. OCLC 1038043717.
