= SKSS =

SKSS may refer to the following:

- Shri Kutch Satsang Swaminarayan, part of the Swaminarayan sect of Hinduism
  - Shri Kutch Satsang Swaminarayan Temple
  - Shri Kutch Satsang Swaminarayan Temple (Harrow) or Shri Swaminarayan Mandir, London (Harrow)
  - Shree Kutch Satsang Swaminarayan Temple, Bolton, England
  - Shree Kutch Satsang Swaminarayan Mandir East London or Shri Swaminarayan Mandir, London (East London)
- South Kamloops Secondary School, Kamloops, British Columbia, Canada
- Christian and Missionary Alliance Sun Kei Secondary School, a Christian School
