= Shri Swaminarayan Mandir, London =

Shri Swaminarayan Mandir, London can refer to several Swaminarayan temples located in London, England:

- BAPS Shri Swaminarayan Mandir London (locally known as the "Neasden Temple")
- BAPS Shri Swaminarayan Mandir Islington (the previous center for BAPS Activities in the UK-Europe Region)
- Shri Swaminarayan Mandir, London (Willesden)
- Shri Swaminarayan Mandir, London (Kenton, Harrow)
- Shri Swaminarayan Mandir, London (East London)
- Shri Swaminarayan Mandir, London (Plumstead)
- Shri Swaminarayan Mandir, London (Streatham)
- Shri Swaminarayan Mandir, London (Stanmore) (earlier at Edgware)
- Shri Swaminarayan Manor, London (Gatwick) (at Crawley near London)
