= London Temple =

London Temple may refer to:

- One of several Swaminarayan temples in the London area:
  - BAPS Shri Swaminarayan Mandir London
  - Shree Sanatan Hindu Mandir
  - Shree Ghanapathy Temple, Wimbledon
  - Shri Swaminarayan Mandir, London (Willesden)
  - Shri Swaminarayan Mandir, London (Harrow)
  - Shri Swaminarayan Mandir, London (East London)
- Radha Krishna Temple - the headquarters of the International Society for Krishna Consciousness (ISKCON) in the United Kingdom.
- London England Temple - the 12th operating temple of The Church of Jesus Christ of Latter-day Saints.
- One of several Buddhist temples in the London area:
  - London Buddhist Vihara
  - London Buddhist Centre
  - London Fo Guang Shan Temple
  - Shaolin Temple UK
  - Wat Buddhapadipa
