= Dada Khachar =

Devotee of Swaminarayan

Dada Khachar (1800–1852) was a devotee of Swaminarayan and the Darbar Shri of Gadhada. His father was Ebhel Khachar and his mother Somadevi. His maiden name was Uttamsinh. He came to be known as Dada Khachar and had four sisters: Jaya (Jivuba), Lalita (Laduba), Panchali, and Nanu. The entire family were followers of Swaminarayan.

It was because of the insistence of Dada Khachar and his sisters that Swaminarayan made Dada Khachar's Darbar (court) in Gadhada his home for over 27 years.

Dada Khachar and his sisters requested Swaminarayan to build a temple in Gadhada. They offered their own place of residence for this purpose. A massive temple, Shri Swaminarayan Mandir, Gadhada, was constructed in the courtyard of Dada's darbar, and became a place of pilgrimage for followers of Swaminarayan. Swaminarayan himself brought stones on his head from the River Ghela for the foundation of the temple. The idol of Gopinath was installed in the central shrine of the temple.

When Swaminarayan departed for His abode, Akshardham, Dada Khachar rushed to jump on the funeral pyre, but was held back by Gopalanand Swami who told Dada Khachar to go to the mango tree in Laxmiwadi where Swaminarayan frequently held assemblies.
