= List of Swaminarayan temples =

Swaminarayan, the founder of the Swaminarayan Sampraday, established temples, known as mandirs (Devnagari: मन्दिर), as part of his philosophy of theism and deity worship.

He constructed nine temples in the following cities; Ahmedabad, Bhuj, Muli, Vadtal, Junagadh, Dholera, Dholka, Gadhpur, and Jetalpur. In these temples he installed images of various Hindu gods, such as Nara-Narayana, Lakshmi Narayana, Radha Krishna, Radha Ramana, Revti-Baldevji, and Madan Mohan. Each of these nine original temples fall either under the Nar Narayan Dev Gadi, Ahmedabad or the Lakshmi Narayan Dev Gadi, Vadtal depending on their geographical location.

One of the most prominent features of the heritage of Swaminarayan Sampradaya is temple architecture. All of the temples constructed during Swaminarayan's life show some form of Krishna, and all temples since have such murtis. In Vadtal, he consecrated his own murti known as Harikrushna Maharaj. In the temples of the dioceses of Ahmedabad and Vadtal, they are predominantly a central altar or a shrine. Human forms are predominant but for a known exception of a Hanuman temple at Sarangpur, where Hanuman is the central figure. The temples have accommodations for sadhus built next to them. Stones were quarried in far places and carried to the temple sites.

Swaminarayan temples, like other Hindu temples, have walkways around the central shrine to allow worshipers to circumambulate the shrine. These are often decorated with designs and inlaid marble. The main shrine area is divided by railings. One side of the railing is reserved for women, as Swaminarayan propagated that men and women should be separated in temples to allow full concentration on God. Men do a specified number of prostrations (as decided by themselves). In front of the men's section, there is a small section reserved for ascetics and special guests. There is great variety in form and nature of the central images, in front of which are gold- or silver-plated doors that open during darshan.

Today there are over a thousand Swaminarayan temples, spread across five continents, which come under the above two Gadis (seats) of the Swaminarayan Sampraday.

== Temples ==
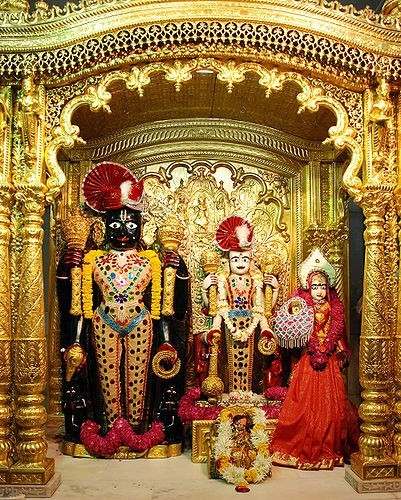
Murtis of Laxmi Narayan with Ranchhodrai at Vadtal

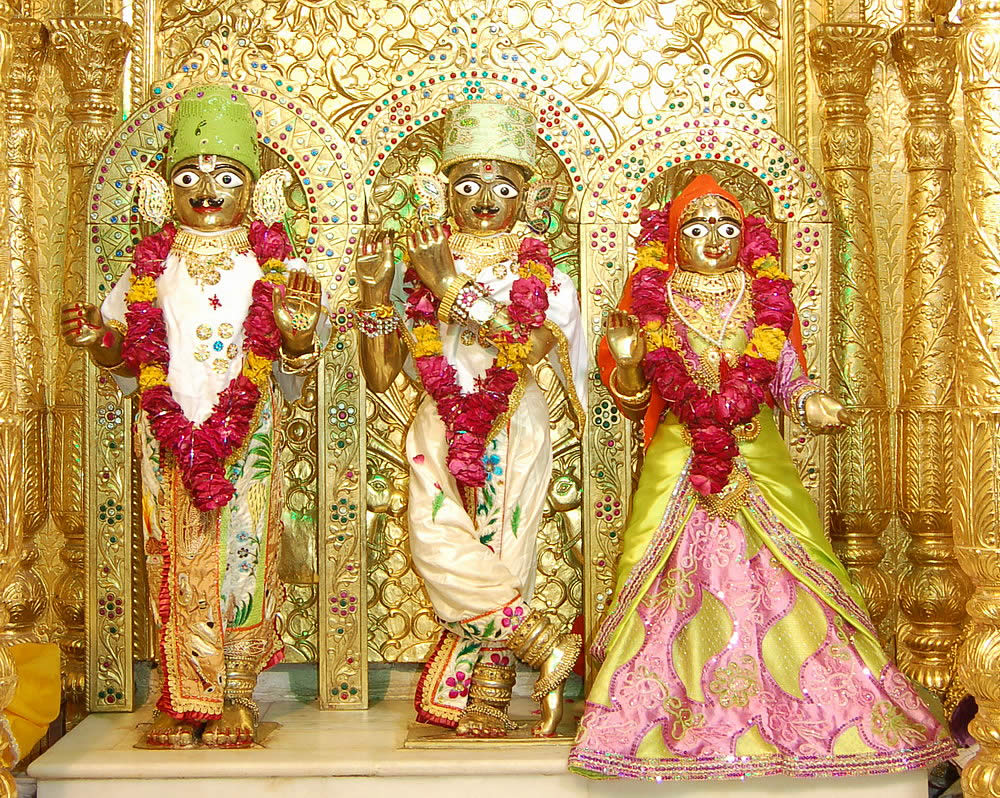
Radha Krishna Dev with Harikrishna Maharaj at Vadtal

As an adjunct to the scriptures in establishing ultimate redemption and consolidating the framework of the holy fellowship (Satsang), Swaminarayan constructed stone mandirs, buttressing Upasana – worshipping God, and devotion towards the deities. Towards the end of his second decade of work, he placed a greater emphasis on devotion than detachment – vairagya to foster love for God. This emphasis on devotion culminated in the building of mandirs, which served as permanent places of worship, centres for religious gathering, instruction, the study of Sanskrit, devotional music and Vedic literature, and as centres of social services where alms, medicines and clothes were available to the poor and needy. In a span of six years, from 1822 till 1828, Swaminarayan sanctioned the construction of nine mandirs in Gujarat: Ahmedabad, Mooli, Bhuj, Vadtal, Jetalpur, Dholera, Dholka, Junagadh and Gadhada.

One of the most prominent features of the heritage of Swaminarayan is its temple architecture. The images in the temples built by Swaminarayan are the evidence of the priority of Krishna. All of the temples constructed during his life show some form of Krishna, and all temples since have such worshipable figures, or murtis. In the temples of the dioceses of Ahmedabad and Vadtal, these are predominantly a central altar or a shrine. Human forms are predominant, with the exception of the Hanuman temple at Sarangpur, where Hanuman is the central figure. The temples have accommodation for ascetics built next to them. Stones were quarried in far places and carried to the temple sites.

Swaminarayan temples, like other Hindu temples, have walkways around the central shrine to allow worshipers to circumambulate the shrine, which is often decorated with designs and inlaid marble. The main shrine area is divided by railings. One side of the railing is reserved for women, as Swaminarayan said that men and women should be separated in temples to allow full concentration on god. Men perform a specified number of prostrations. In front of the men's section, there is normally a small area reserved for ascetics and special guests. There is great variety in the form and nature of the central images, in front of which are gold- or silver-plated doors that open during darshan. Swaminarayan ordered the construction of the following six mandirs and installed the images of various deities, such as Nara Narayana, Laxminarayan, Radha Krishna, Radha Ramana, Revti Baldevji, himself.

=== Temples in India ===
==== Shri Swaminarayan Mandir, Ahmedabad ====
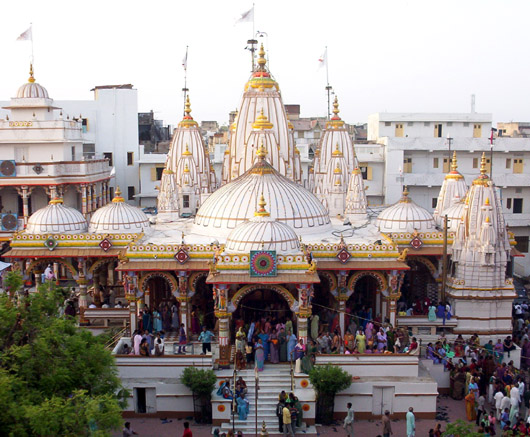
Swaminarayan temple in Ahmedabad

Shri Swaminarayan Mandir is the first temple Swaminarayan constructed. It was built in Ahmedabad in 1822, and presents images of Nara Narayana, who occupies the principal seat of the temple, and forms of Arjuna and Krishna at the central altar. The left altar has murtis of Radha Krishna. The land for construction of the temple was donated by the East India Company government of the day. The task of constructing it was entrusted by Swaminarayan to Ananandand Swami. The temple is constructed as per scriptural norms with intricate carving in Burma teak and sculptural art depicting deities' episodes, auspicious symbols and religious icons representing axiomatic religion and Indian culture. The temple is believed to be a valuable cultural heritage in the socio-religious history of Gujarat and India. The installation ceremony of the murti forms in the temple was celebrated in the presence of thousands of pilgrims from across India. Nara Narayana .

==== Shri Swaminarayan Mandir, Bhuj ====
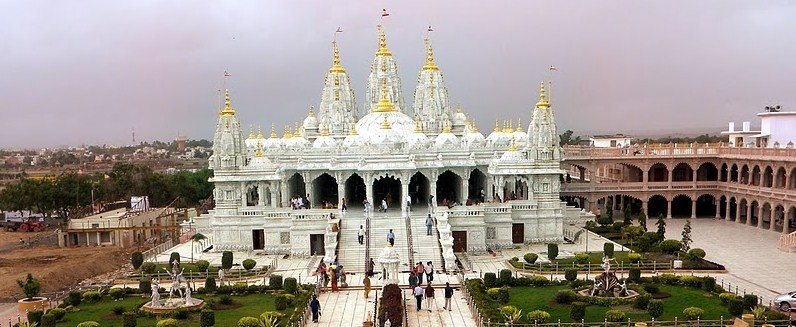
New temple in Bhuj

On the request of devotees from Bhuj, Swaminarayan asked Vaishnavananand Swami to go there with a team of saints and build a temple. In 1822, they camped on land adjacent to the temple site and drew plans of the temple complex. within a year they had built a temple abode of Nar Narayan. The Gujarat earthquake on 26 January 2001 destroyed much of the city of Bhuj, including this temple. Members of the Swaminarayan Sampraday, including saints and satsangis of Kutch residing in India and abroad, have resolved to construct a new marble temple a short distance from the site. The new temple, the largest in Gujarat, was opened in May 2010 by the then Chief Minister of Gujarat, Narendra Modi.

==== Shri Swaminarayan Mandir, Vadtal ====
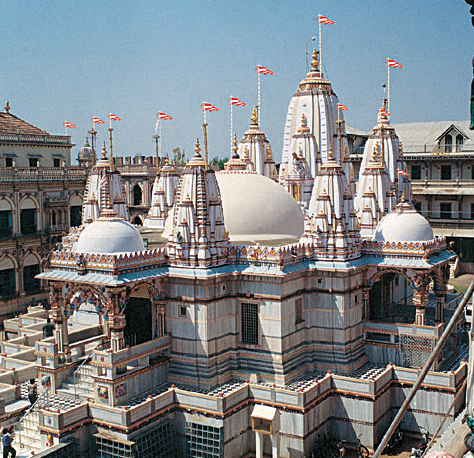
Swaminarayan Temple in Vadtal

The temple in Vadtal, also known as Vadtal Swaminarayan, is in the shape of a lotus, with nine domes in the inner temple. The land for this shrine was donated by Joban Pagi, a dacoit who was later converted into a devotee by Swaminarayan. The temple was constructed under the supervision of Brahmanand Swami, was completed within fifteen months and the idols of Laxmi Narayan was installed by Swaminarayan on 3 November 1824, amidst chants of vedic hymns and devotional fervour of the installation ceremony. Swaminarayan also installed his own idol in Vadtal, naming it Harikrishna Maharaj. The walls are decorated with colourful representations from the Ramayana. The temple's walls are decorated with colourful representations from the Ramayana.

==== Shri Swaminarayan Mandir, Dholera ====
Dholera is an ancient port-city, 30 kilometres (19 mi) from Dhandhuka in Ahmedabad District. This temple has three domes. Its construction was supervised and planned by Nishkulanand Swami, Bhai Atmanand Swami, Akshardanand Swami and Dharmprasad Swami. The land for the temple was donated by Darbar Punjabhai. On 19 May 1826, Swaminarayan installed the idols of Madan Mohan and his own form Harikrishna, at the principal seat of the temple and invoked Gods amidst Vedic hymns.

==== Shri Swaminarayan Mandir, Junagadh ====
This temple, in the city of Junagadh on Mount Girnar, has five domes and external decoration with sculptures. Its construction was supervised by Brahmanand Swami; it was built on land donated by king Hemantsinh of Jinabhai, Darbar of Panchala. On 1 May 1828, Swaminarayan installed the murtis of Ranchhodrai and Trikamrai on the principal altar of the temple, which is 278-foot (85 m) in circumference. The life of Swaminarayan is crafted in stone on the dome of the sanctum.

==== Shri Swaminarayan Mandir, Gadhada ====
The land for the temple in Gadhada (or Gadhpur) was donated by the court of Dada Khachar in Gadhada. Darbar Dada Khachar and his family were devotees of Swaminarayan. The temple was made built the courtyard of his own residence. This shrine has two stories and three domes and is adorned with carvings. Swaminarayan assisted in the construction of the temple by lifting stones and mortar, and he installed the figures of Gopinath, Radhika and Harikrishna on 9 October 1828.

Gadhada is also home to Laxmi Vadi. This is the burial place of Swaminarayan's ashes. The site is marked by a shrine consisting of the idols of brother Ichharam, Swaminarayan himself and Raghuvirji Maharaj.

==== Other temples ====
Sahajanand Swami also ordered construction of temples at Muli, Dholka and Jetalpur. Although these temples were completed after his death, the Murti pratishtas, idol installation ceremonies, were conducted by Sahajanand Swami. He installed images of various manifestations of God, such as Nar Narayan Dev, Laxmi Narayan Dev, Radha Krishna, Radha Raman and Revti Baldevji. Swaminarayan lived in Gadhpur for about 27 years; he stayed at the Darbar of Dada Khachar, one of his best-known devotees. At some temples, footprints of Swaminarayan are worshiped by his followers. Swaminarayan entrusted the day-to-day performance of the worship rituals in these mandirs to ascetics. By 2012, there were over a thousand Swaminarayan temples across five continents.

=== Overseas ===
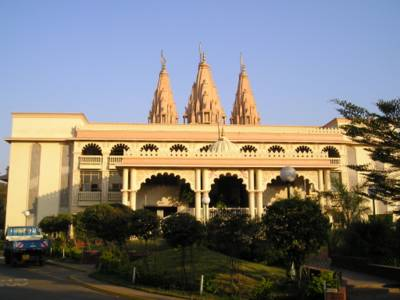
First Swaminarayan temple outside the Indian subcontinent in Nairobi (1945)

In the 1920s, members of the sect began to move out of India to East Africa in search of work and better lives. Among these was a large number of Kutchis of the Leva Patel/Patidar community, who remained to the Bhuj temple under the Nar Nararayan Dev Gadi. All the temples built in Africa come under the temple in Bhuj. The first Swaminarayan temple in Africa was built in Nairobi in 1945, and temples were built in Mombasa and other Kenyan towns in the following years. Temples were also built in Tanzania and Uganda. The Swaminarayan temple in Karachi, Pakistan, was built in 1868 when Karachi was part of the Indian Union.

After the Second World War, members of the movement in East Africa began migrating to the United Kingdom; the number of migrants rose significantly in the 1960s and 1970s. The first Swaminarayan temple in the UK was built in Bolton in 1973. This was followed by a temple in the London suburb of Willesden, which was consecrated in 1975 and is the sect's biggest temple in the UK. Temples have been built in other parts of the UK, such as Cardiff, Oldham, Leicester and Brighton and several others in London. The temple in Leicester was opened in 1993 and was the first in Europe under the International Swaminarayan Satsang Organisation (ISSO) and was followed by one in Sweden.

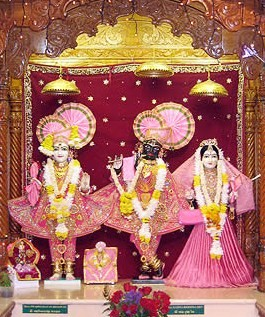
Swaminarayan in the form of Ghanshyam (left) with Radha Krishna at the Swaminarayan temple in Houston

A small number of followers migrated to the United States before 1965 as students, and following a 1965 immigration law, a large number of Indians, including members of the sect. moved there from the 1970s until 2000. The ISSO was formed in 1978 in Chicago under the Nar Narayan Dev Gadi. The temple in Weehawken, New Jersey, was opened in 1987, and was the first in the US. By 2012, the organisation had 20 temples in the US, in cities including Boston, Houston, Chicago, Los Angeles, Tampa, Florida, Detroit and Cleveland, Ohio, Colonia, Parsippany and Cherry Hill. Another organisation, International Swaminarayan Satsang Mandal (ISSM), under the Laxmi Narayan Dev Gadi, has temples in Chicago, Grand Prairie, Texas, Sunnyvale, California, Downey and Somerset, New Jersey. Also under the Laxmi Narayan Dev Gadi, the Laxminarayan Dev Spiritual Organisation (LDSO) has been set up in San Francisco to promote the faith there.

The movement also has temples in Australia, Seychelles, Canada, Thailand, Fiji, Mauritius, New Zealand, Oman, UAE and Zambia.

== Australia ==
=== New South Wales ===
Swaminarayan Mandir, Sydney	
Location: Primary Deity: Constructed in: Architecture: Notes:	Sydney - 2008 - This Mandir comes under the NarNarayan Dev Gadi

=== Victoria ===
Shri Swaminarayan Mandir, Bhuj - Melbourne	
Location: Primary Deity: Constructed in: Architecture: Notes:	Melbourne; NarNarayan Dev; 2012 - This Mandir comes under the NarNarayan Dev Gadi

Shree Swaminarayan Hindu Mandir - Melbourne (ISSO)	
Location: Primary Deity: Constructed in: Architecture: Notes:	Melbourne; NarNarayan Dev; 2016 - This Mandir comes under the NarNarayan Dev Gadi

Shree Swaminarayan Hindu Mandir - Casey, Melbourne (ISSO)	
Location: Primary Deity: Constructed in: Architecture: Notes:	Melbourne; NarNarayan Dev - - This Mandir comes under the NarNarayan Dev Gadi

=== Western Australia ===
Swaminarayan Mandir, Perth	
Location: Primary Deity: Constructed in: Architecture: Notes:	Perth, Western Australia - - - This Mandir comes under the true swaminarayan faith of the gadi.

=== Queensland ===
BAPS Shri Swaminarayan Mandir, Brisbane	
Location: Primary Deity: Constructed in: Architecture: Notes:	Brisbane - - - This Mandir comes under the BAPS

=== South Australia ===
Shri Swaminarayan Mandir, Adelaide	
Location: Primary Deity: Constructed in: Architecture: Notes:	Adelaide - - - This Mandir comes under the NarNarayan Dev Gadi

== Canada ==
=== Ontario ===
Shri Swaminarayan Mandir, Toronto	
Location: Primary Deity: Constructed in: Architecture: Notes:	Toronto; Swaminarayan; 10 August 2008 - This Mandir comes under the BAPS

Shree Swaminarayan Mandir, Toronto	
Location: Primary Deity: Constructed in: Architecture: Notes:	Toronto; Swaminarayan; 10 May 2008 - This Mandir comes under the ISSO

=== Saskatchewan ===
Shri Swaminarayan Mandir, Saskatoon	
Location: Primary Deity: Constructed in: Architecture: Notes:	Saskatoon; Shri Akshar-Purushottam Maharaj - - This Mandir comes under the BAPS

Shree Swaminarayan Hindu Temple, Saskatoon	
Location: Primary Deity: Constructed in: Architecture: Notes:	Saskatoon - - - This Mandir comes under the ISSO

Shree Swaminarayan Mandir, Regina	
Location: Primary Deity: Constructed in: Architecture: Notes:	Regina - - - This Mandir comes under the ISSO

== Fiji ==
Shri Swaminarayan Mandir, Fiji (Chapter)	
Location: Primary Deity: Constructed in: Architecture: Notes:	Fiji; Bhagwan Swaminarayan - - This Mandir comes under the BAPS

BAPS Swaminarayan Sanstha - Home

== India ==
=== Delhi ===
Akshardham (Delhi)	
Location: Primary Deity: Constructed in: Architecture: Notes:	Akshardham (Delhi) - - - This Mandir comes under the BAPS

श्री अक्षरपुरुषोत्तम स्वामीनारायण मंदिर (Shri Aksharpurushottam Swaminarayan Mandir)	
Location: Primary Deity: Constructed in: Architecture: Founder:	Ashok Vihar, Delhi; Swaminarayan; 3 February 1988 (3 February 1994) - Dadubhai Patel (Dadukaka or Kakaji)

=== Telangana ===
Shri Swaminarayan Mandir, Hyderabad	
Location: Primary Deity: Constructed in: Architecture: Notes:	Hyderabad - - - This Mandir comes under the BAPS

=== West Bengal ===
Shri Swaminarayan Mandir, Kolkata	
Location: Primary Deity: Constructed in: Architecture: Notes:	Pailan, Diamond Harbour Rd, Kolkata, West Bengal 700020 - BAPS Shri Swaminarayan Mandir, Bhasa, was constructed and opened to public in the year 2014 - This Mandir comes under the BAPS

=== Gujarat ===
Gujarat Origin Place of Swaminarayan Sampraday

Shri Swaminarayan Mandir, Ahmedabad (Kankaria-Maninagar)	
Location: Primary Deity: Constructed in: Architecture: Notes:	Ahmedabad; Swaminarayan - - This Mandir comes under the NarNarayan Dev Gadi

Shri Swaminarayan Mandir, Ahmedabad (Narayan Ghat)	
Location: Primary Deity: Constructed in: Architecture: Notes:	Ahmedabad; Swaminarayan - Multi-spire Structure; This Mandir comes under the NarNarayan Dev Gadi

Shri Swaminarayan Mandir, Ahmedabad (Narayanpura)	
Location: Primary Deity: Constructed in: Architecture: Notes:	Ahmedabad; Swaminarayan - Tri-spire Structure; This Mandir comes under the NarNarayan Dev Gadi

Shri Swaminarayan Mandir, Vadtal	
Location: Primary Deity: Constructed in: Architecture: Notes:	Vadtal; Swaminarayan; 3 November 1824; In the Shape of a Lotus; Headquarters of the LaxmiNarayan Dev Gadi

Shri Swaminarayan Mandir, Bhuj	
Location: Primary Deity: Constructed in: Architecture: Notes:	Bhuj; Swaminarayan; 1823; Multi-spire Structure; This Mandir was built by Swaminarayan himself

Shri Swaminarayan Mandir, Bhuj (New temple)	
Location: Primary Deity: Constructed in: Architecture: Notes:	Bhuj; NarNarayan Dev, HariKrishna Maharaj, RadhaKrushna Dev and Ghanshyam Maharaj; 2010; Multi-spire marble and gold structure The original Swaminarayan temple in Bhuj was damaged by an earthquake in 2001. This temple has been built to replace the old one, which will now serve as a museum.

Shri Swaminarayan Mandir, Junagadh	
Location: Primary Deity: Constructed in: Architecture: Notes:	Junagadh; Ranchhodrai and Trikamrai; 1 May 1828; 5 Dome Structure with sculptures This Mandir was built by Swaminarayan himself

Shri Swaminarayan Mandir, Dholera	
Location: Primary Deity: Constructed in: Architecture: Notes:	Dholera; Madan Mohan Dev and HariKrishna Maharaj; 19 May 1826; Three Dome Structure; This Mandir was built by Swaminarayan himself

Shri Swaminarayan Mandir, Gadhada	
Location: Primary Deity: Constructed in: Architecture: Notes:	Gadhada; Gopinathji Maharaj and HariKrishna Maharaj; 9 October 1828; Three Domes and two storied Structure; This Mandir was built by Swaminarayan himself

Shri Swaminarayan Mandir, Rajkot	
Location: Primary Deity: Constructed in: Architecture: Notes:	Rajkot; Laxminarayan Dev, HariKrishna Maharaj and Ghanshyam Maharaj - - This Mandir comes under the LaxmiNarayan Dev Gadi

Shri Swaminarayan Mandir, Sardhar	
Location: Primary Deity: Constructed in: Architecture: Notes:	Sardhar; Laxminarayan Dev and Ghanshyam Maharaj - - This Mandir comes under the LaxmiNarayan Dev Gadi

Shri Swaminarayan Mandir, Muli	
Location: Primary Deity: Constructed in: Architecture: Notes:	Muli; RadhaKrishna Dev - - This Mandir comes under the Narnarayan Dev Gadi

Shri Hanuman Mandir, Sarangpur	
Location: Primary Deity: Constructed in: Architecture: Notes:	Sarangpur; Kastbhanjan Dev - - This Mandir comes under the LaxmiNarayan Dev Gadi

Shri Swaminarayan Mandir, Jamnagar	
Location: Primary Deity: Constructed in: Architecture: Notes:	Jamnagar; RadhaKrishna Dev and HariKrishna Maharaj - - This Mandir comes under the LaxmiNarayan Dev Gadi

Shri Swaminarayan Mandir, Jetalpur	
Location: Primary Deity: Constructed in: Architecture: Notes:	Jamnagar; Revati-Baldevji - - This Mandir comes under the NarNarayan Dev Gadi

Shri Swaminarayan Mandir, Gandhinagar	
Location: Primary Deity: Constructed in: Architecture: Notes:	Gandhinagar; NarNarayan and RadhaKrishna - - This Mandir comes under the NarNarayan Dev Gadi

Shri Swaminarayan Sanskardham Gurukul, Dhrangadhra	
Location: Primary Deity: Constructed in: Architecture: Notes:	Dhrangadhra; NarNarayan and RadhaKrishna - - This Sanskardham comes under the NarNarayan, Laxminarayan Dev Gadi

=== Karnataka ===
Shri Swaminarayan Mandir, Bengaluru (Bangalore)	
Location: Primary Deity: Constructed in: Architecture: Notes:	Bengaluru; Laxminarayan Dev; 2003 - This Mandir comes under the LaxmiNarayan Dev Gadi

=== Madhya Pradesh ===
Madhya Khand, Shri Swaminarayan Mandir, Silampura, Burhanpur - 450331 Ghanshyam Maharaj, Shri Swaminarayan Mandir, Silampura, Burhanpur - 450331 Suvarna Sinhasan Mahotsav, Shri Swaminarayan Mandir, Silampura, Burhanpur - 450331	Shri Swaminarayan Mandir, Burhanpur	
Madhya Khand, Shri Swaminarayan Mandir, Silampura, Burhanpur - 450331 Ghanshyam Maharaj, Shri Swaminarayan Mandir, Silampura, Burhanpur - 450331 Suvarna Sinhasan Mahotsav, Shri Swaminarayan Mandir, Silampura, Burhanpur - 450331	Location: Primary Deity: Constructed in: Architecture: Notes:	Burhanpur; LakshmiNarayan Dev - - This Mandir comes under the LaxmiNarayan Dev Gadi
Madhya Khand, Shri Swaminarayan Mandir, Silampura, Burhanpur - 450331 Ghanshyam Maharaj, Shri Swaminarayan Mandir, Silampura, Burhanpur - 450331 Suvarna Sinhasan Mahotsav, Shri Swaminarayan Mandir, Silampura, Burhanpur - 450331	Burhanpur is an old city in State of Madhya Pradesh, India. Satsang in this religious city of Burahanpur started in 1798 when Swaminarayan sanctified this city on his pilgrimage as Neelkanth Varni. Later, he sent his paramhansas like Kripanand Swami, Gunatitanand Swami, Premanand Swami, Poornanand Swami, Naronarayananad Swami, Nirvikaranand Swami, Anantanand Swami, Adbhutanand Swami, etc. who sowed roots of Satsang in this city. Swaminarayan himself gave Lakshminarayan Dev to Seth Shiva Shah of Burhanpur in 1825–26. Idols of L.N. Dev were then kept at the residence of Brahmin Ramchandra who lived at site of present temple. In December 1829 Idols of L.N. Dev were installed in small temple of 1 shikhar by Acharya Shri Raghuvirji Maharaj with Param Chaitanyanand Swami. In Samvat 1907, Raghuveerji Maharaj visited Burhanpur with Narsimhanand Swami and a huge procession was carried out in the city. Later in 1871, Acharya Bhagwatprasadji installed Harikrishna Maharaj adjacent to L.N. Dev and instructed Swami Balmukunddasji guru Gopalanand Swami to build a huge temple. Eventually, Balmukund Swami completed new temple in 1875 without disturbing the original installation of idols. Bhagwatprasadji came with Adbhutanand Swami, Pavitranand Swami, Gopalji Maharaj, Nishkamanand Bramhchari, etc. in a Train (then called as Aag-gadi). Thereafter in the year around 1898, Bramchari Chaitanyanandhi, Br. Nirdoshanandji, Krishnanandji, Nishkamanandji on the instruction of Shri Viharilalji Maharaj and with donation from Shri Bhaulal Haridasji Gandhi installed Ghanshyam Maharaj in Sukhshaiya on the right of L.N. Dev. Later in 1944 Shri Goverdhandas Gandhi son of Shri Bhaulal Gandhi donated a farm at Titgao for maintenance of Ghanshyam Maharaj. This temple also witnessed satsang under great saints like Br.Mayatitanandji, Br. Atmanandji, Br. Chaitanyanandji, etc. and Purani Dharmswaroopdasji, Shastri Nilkanthdasji, Chaturbhuj Shastri, Shastri Lakshmiprasaddasji, etc. Also well known ekantik haribhakt were Seth Shyamdas Shiva Shah, Seth Onkardas Nanabhai, Seth Narottamdas Lakshmidas, Bhaulal Haridas Gandhi, Seth Tikamdas Bechardas Shah, Seth Ranchoddas Merchant and others. Mayatitanand Bramhchari also initiated daily Abhishek of idols in this temple and also inspired Swami Sevak Mandal to make Hir na Hindola in Samvat 1991 in Burhanpur Temple. Present Kothari of temple is Shatri P.P. Swami. By Pankaj G. Shah	

=== Jabalpur ===
Swaminarayan Mandir, Jabalpur	
Location: Primary Deity: Constructed in: Architecture: Notes:	Jabalpur - 2019 - This Mandir is built at the Birthplace of Sadhu Keshavjivandas of BAPS

=== Maharashtra ===
Shri Swaminarayan Mandir, Mumbai (Bhuleshwar)	
Location: Primary Deity: Constructed in: Architecture: Notes:	Mumbai; LaxmiNarayan Dev, Ghanshyam Maharaj and Gaulokvihari Maharaj; 1868; Tri-Spire Structure; Under LaxmiNarayan Dev Gadi, This is the first Swaminarayan Mandir in Mumbai.

Shri Swaminarayan Mandir, Mumbai (Mulund)	
Location: Primary Deity: Constructed in: Architecture: Notes:	Mumbai; LaxmiNarayan; 1983 - This Mandir comes under the LaxmiNarayan Dev Gadi

Shri Swaminarayan Mandir, Mumbai (Ghatkopar)	
Location: Primary Deity: Constructed in: Architecture: Notes:	Ghatkopar - - - This Mandir comes under the LaxmiNarayan Dev Gadi

Shri Swaminarayan Mandir, Mumbai (Kandivali)	
Location: Primary Deity: Constructed in: Architecture: Notes:	Mumbai - - - This Mandir comes under the LaxmiNarayan Dev Gadi

BAPS Swaminarayan Temple, Nagpur	Shri Swaminarayan Mandir, Nagpur	
BAPS Swaminarayan Temple, Nagpur	Location: Primary Deity: Constructed in: Architecture: Notes:	Nagpur - - - This Mandir comes under the LaxmiNarayan Dev Gadi

Shri Swaminarayan Mandir, Nashik	
Location: Primary Deity: Constructed in: Architecture: Notes:	Nashik - - - This Mandir comes under the LaxmiNarayan Dev Gadi

Shri Swaminarayan Mandir, Kalyan	
Location: Primary Deity: Constructed in: Architecture: Notes:	Kalyan (Thane district); LaxmiNarayan - - This Mandir comes under the LaxmiNarayan Dev Gadi

Shri Swaminarayan Mandir, Kolhapur	
Location: Primary Deity: Constructed in: Architecture: Notes:	Kolhapur; Swaminarayan; 2007 - This Mandir comes under the LaxmiNarayan Dev Gadi

=== Rajasthan ===
Shri Swaminarayan Mandir, Jaipur	
Location: Primary Deity: Constructed in: Architecture: Notes:	Jaipur - - - This Mandir comes under the NarNarayan Dev Gadi

Shri Swaminarayan Mandir, Nathdwara	
Location: Primary Deity: Constructed in: Architecture: Notes:	Nathdwara - - - This Mandir comes under the NarNarayan Dev Gadi

Shri Swaminarayan Mandir, Khan Village, Rajasthan	
Location: Primary Deity: Constructed in: Architecture: Notes:	Khan Village - - - This Mandir comes under the NarNarayan Dev Gadi.

=== Tamil Nadu ===
Shri Swaminarayan Mandir, Chennai	
Location: Primary Deity: Constructed in: Architecture: Notes:	Chennai (Madras) - - - This Mandir comes under the LaxmiNarayan Dev Gadi

Shri Swaminarayan Mandir, Rameshwaram	
Location: Primary Deity: Constructed in: Architecture: Notes:	Rameshwaram - - - This Mandir comes under the LaxmiNarayan Dev Gadi

=== Uttarakhand ===
Shri Swaminarayan Mandir, Badrinath	
Location: Primary Deity: Constructed in: Architecture: Notes:	Badrinath; Swaminarayan and NarNarayan - Tiled roof structure in the Backdrop of the Himalaya's; This Mandir comes under the NarNarayan Dev Gadi

Shri Swaminarayan Mandir, Haridwar	
Location: Primary Deity: Constructed in: Architecture: Notes:	Haridwar; Swaminarayan; 2003 - This Mandir comes under the NarNarayan Dev Gadi

=== Uttar Pradesh ===
Shri Swaminarayan Mandir, Chhapiya	
Location: Primary Deity: Constructed in: Architecture: Notes:	Chhapiya; Ghanshyam Maharaj - Multi-spire Structure; This Mandir comes under the NarNarayan Dev Gadi

Shri Swaminarayan Mandir, Mathura	
Location: Primary Deity: Constructed in: Architecture: Notes:	Mathura - - - This Mandir comes under the NarNarayan Dev Gadi

Shri Swaminarayan Mandir, Kanpur	
Location: Primary Deity: Constructed in: Architecture: Notes:	Kanpur - - - This Mandir comes under the NarNarayan Dev Gadi

Shri Swaminarayan Mandir, Ayodhya	
Location: Primary Deity: Constructed in: Architecture: Notes:	Ayodhya - - - This Mandir comes under the NarNarayan Dev Gadi

Shri Swaminarayan Mandir, Allahabad	
Location: Primary Deity: Constructed in: Architecture: Notes:	Allahabad - - - This Mandir comes under the NarNarayan Dev Gadi

Shri Swaminarayan Mandir, Varanasi (Kashi)	
Location: Contact: Primary Deity: Constructed in: Architecture: Notes:	K-1/1, Machhodari Park, Gaighat, Varanasi - 221001 (KASHI) +91 9415448802 / +91 9839265663 - - - This Mandir comes under the NarNarayan Dev Gadi

== Kenya ==
=== Central Province ===
Shri Swaminarayan Mandir, Kerugoya	
Location: Primary Deity: Constructed in: Architecture: Notes:	Kerugoya - - - This Mandir comes under the NarNarayan Dev Gadi

=== Coast Province ===
Shri Swaminarayan Mandir, Mombasa	
Location: Primary Deity: Constructed in: Architecture: Notes:	Mombasa; Swaminarayan; 1958; Single-spire Structure; This Mandir comes under the NarNarayan Dev Gadi

=== Nairobi Province ===
Shri Swaminarayan Mandir, Nairobi (SKSS)	
Location: Primary Deity: Constructed in: Architecture: Notes:	Nairobi; Swaminarayan; 1954; Single-spire Structure; This Mandir comes under the NarNarayan Dev Gadi

Shri Swaminarayan Mandir, Nairobi (EASS)	
Location: Primary Deity: Constructed in: Architecture: Notes:	Nairobi; Swaminarayan; 1945; Tri-spire Structure; This Mandir comes under the NarNarayan Dev Gadi and was the first Swaminarayan temple outside India and on the continent of Africa

=== Nyanza Province ===
Shri Swaminarayan Mandir, Kisumu	
Location: Primary Deity: Constructed in: Architecture: Notes:	Kisumu - - - This Mandir comes under the NarNarayan Dev Gadi

=== Rift Valley Province ===
Shri Swaminarayan Mandir, Eldoret	
Location: Primary Deity: Constructed in: Architecture: Notes:	Eldoret; NarNarayan; 2011; Tri-spire; This Mandir comes under the NarNarayan Dev Gadi

Shri Swaminarayan Mandir, Nakuru	
Location: Primary Deity: Constructed in: Architecture: Notes:	Nakuru - - - This Mandir comes under the Narnarayan Dev Gadi

== Mauritius ==
Shri Swaminarayan Mandir, Terre Rough, Mauritius	
Location: PrimaryDeity: Constructed in: Architecture: Notes:	1st Floor, Kurjibhai Ramjibhai Building Le Hochet, Terre Rough Mauritius Tel: +230 2493656. Fax: +230 2481481; Lord Swaminarayan - - This Mandir comes under the NarNarayan Dev Gadi

== New Zealand ==
Shri Swaminarayan Mandir, Auckland	
Location: Primary Deity: Constructed in: Architecture: Notes:	Auckland; Narnarayan Dev, Ghanshyam Maharaj and RadhaKrishna Dev; 24 March 2008; Tri spire with Haveli; This Mandir comes under the NarNarayan Dev Gadi (ISSO)

== Oman ==
Shri Swaminarayan Mandir, Muscat	
Location: Primary Deity: Constructed in: Architecture: Notes:	Muscat - - - This Mandir comes under the NarNarayan Dev Gadi

== Pakistan ==
=== Sindh ===
Shri Swaminarayan Mandir, Karachi	
Location: Primary Deity: Constructed in: Architecture: Notes:	Karachi; Swaminarayan; 1849; Single-spire and dome Structure; This Mandir comes under the NarNarayan Dev Gadi

== Seychelles ==
Shri Swaminarayan Mandir, Victoria	
Location: Primary Deity: Constructed in: Architecture: Notes:	Victoria - - - This Mandir comes under the NarNarayan Dev Gadi

== Sweden ==
Shri Swaminarayan Mandir, Mariestad	
Location: Primary Deity: Constructed in: Architecture: Notes:	Mariestad; NarNarayan Dev, Swaminarayan and RadhaKrishna Dev - Tiled-roof Structure; This Mandir comes under the NarNarayan Dev Gadi

== Tanzania ==
=== Arusha Region ===
Shri Swaminarayan Mandir, Arusha	
Location: Primary Deity: Constructed in: Architecture: Notes:	Arusha - - - This Mandir comes under the Maninagar swaminarayan

=== Dar-es-Salaam Region ===
Shri Swaminarayan Mandir, Dar-es-Salaam	
Location: Primary Deity: Constructed in: Architecture: Notes:	Dar-es-Salaam; Swaminarayan; 1958; Haveli style tri-spire structure This Temple is owned by Tanzania Swaminarayan Mandal, an organization blessed by both the Acharyas of Amdavad & Vadtal. It is open to devotees of all caste/color/creed. For more details and activities of this Temple

== Thailand ==
Shri Swaminarayan Mandir, Bangkok (Chapter)	
Location: Primary Deity: Constructed in: Architecture: Notes:	Bangkok; Akshar Purushottam Maharaj - - This Mandir comes under the BAPS

== UAE ==
BAPS Hindu Mandir Abu Dhabi	
Location: Primary Deity: Constructed in: Architecture: Notes:	Abu Dhabi; Bhagwan Swaminarayan; 2024; 7-spire structure This Mandir comes under the BAPS

== Uganda ==
Shri Swaminarayan Mandir, Kampala	
Location: Primary Deity: Constructed in: Architecture: Notes:	Kampala; Swaminarayan - Tri-spire Structure; This Mandir comes under the NarNarayan Dev Gadi

Shri Swaminarayan Mandir, Kampala	
Location: Primary Deity: Constructed in: Architecture: Notes:	Kampala; Akshar Purushottam Maharaj Swaminarayan - Tri-spire Structure; This Mandir comes under the Baps

== France ==
BAPS Swaminarayan Hindu Mandir, Paris	
Location: Primary Deity: Constructed in: Architecture: Notes:	Paris, Bussy-Saint-Geogres; Bhagwan Shri Swaminarayan, Shri Akshar-Purushottam Maharaj and other deities - Ghanshyam Maharaj, Nilkanth Varni Maharaj, Radha-Krishna Bhagwan, Ram-Sita Bhagwan Hanumanji, Shankar-Parvati Bhagwan Ganapatiji and others 2026 - First traditional Hindu Mandir in France.This Mandir comes under BAPS Bochasanwasi Shri Akshar-Purushottam Swaminarayan Sanstha

== United Kingdom ==
=== East Midlands ===
Shri Swaminarayan Mandir, Leicester	
Location: Primary Deity: Constructed in: Architecture: Notes:	Leicester; Narnarayan Dev - - This Mandir comes under the NarNarayan Dev Gadi (ISSO)

Shri Hanumanji Mandir, Leicester	
Location: Primary Deity: Constructed in: Architecture: Notes:	Leicester; Kastbhanjan Dev - - This Mandir comes under the LaxmiNarayan Dev Gadi

=== London ===
Shri Swaminarayan Mandir, London (East London)	
Location: Primary Deity: Constructed in: Architecture: Notes:	London; Ghanshyam Maharaj; 1988 - Under NarNarayan Dev Gadi, One of the seven Swaminarayan temples in London

Shri Swaminarayan Mandir, London (Streatham)	
Location: Primary Deity: Constructed in: Architecture: Notes:	London - - Tiled roof Structure; Under NarNarayan Dev Gadi (ISSO), One of the seven Swaminarayan temples in London

Shri Swaminarayan Mandir, London (Willesden)	
Location: Primary Deity: Constructed in: Architecture: Notes:	London; Ghanshyam Maharaj; 1975; Tri-spire Structure; Under NarNarayan Dev Gadi, One of the seven Swaminarayan temples in London

BAPS Shri Swaminarayan Mandir London	
Location: Primary Deity: Constructed in: Architecture: Notes:	London (Neasden); Swaminarayan; 1995; Tri-spire Structure; Constructed by Bochasanwasi Shri Akshar Purushottam Swaminarayan Sanstha

Shri Swaminarayan Mandir, London (Harrow)	
Location: Primary Deity: Constructed in: Architecture: Notes:	London; Ghanshyam Maharaj; 1997; Tri-spire Structure; Under NarNarayan Dev Gadi, One of the seven Swaminarayan temples in London

Shri Swaminarayan Mandir, London (Stanmore)	
Location: Primary Deity: Constructed in: Architecture: Notes:	London; Ghanshyam Maharaj; 2006; Haveli Style Structure with Single-spire Under NarNarayan Dev Gadi, One of the seven Swaminarayan temples in London

Shri Swaminarayan Mandir, London (Plumstead)	
Location: Primary Deity: Constructed in: Architecture: Notes:	London; Swaminarayan - - Under NarNarayan Dev Gadi, One of the seven Swaminarayan temples in London

=== North West England ===
Shri Swaminarayan Mandir, Oldham	
Location: Primary Deity: Constructed in: Architecture: Notes:	Oldham; Swaminarayan; 1977 - This Mandir comes under the NarNarayan Dev Gadi

Shri Swaminarayan Mandir, Bolton	
Location: Primary Deity: Constructed in: Architecture: Notes:	Bolton; Swaminarayan; 1973; Single-spire Structure; This Mandir comes under the NarNarayan Dev Gadi. First purpose built Swaminarayan temple in UK.

=== South East England ===
Shri Swaminarayan Mandir, Crawley (Gatwick – Near London)	
Location: Primary Deity: Constructed in: Architecture: Notes:	Crawley; HariKrishna Maharaj; 2006 - This Mandir comes under the under NarNarayan Dev Gadi (ISSO)

Shri Swaminarayan Mandir, Brighton	
Location: Primary Deity: Constructed in: Architecture: Notes:	Brighton; Swaminarayan; 1999 - This Mandir comes under the NarNarayan Dev Gadi (ISSO)

=== Wales ===
Shri Swaminarayan Mandir, Cardiff	
Location: Primary Deity: Constructed in: Architecture: Notes:	Cardiff; Ghanshyam Maharaj; 1982; Traditional Hindu Architecture; This Mandir comes under the NarNarayan Dev Gadi

=== West Midlands ===
Shri Swaminarayan Mandir, Nottingham (Chapter)	
Location: Primary Deity: Constructed in: Architecture: Notes:	Nottingham - - - This Mandir comes under the NarNarayan Dev Gadi (ISSO)

== United States ==
=== Alabama ===
Shri Swaminarayan Mandir, Birmingham, Alabama (Chapter)	
Location: Primary Deity: Constructed in: Architecture: Notes:	Birmingham, Alabama - - - This Mandir comes under the Bochasanwasi Akshar Purushottam Swaminarayan Sanstha

=== California ===
Shri Swaminarayan Mandir, Norwalk	
Location: Primary Deity: Constructed in: Architecture: Notes:	Los Angeles; RadhaKrishna Dev - - This Mandir comes under the NarNarayan Dev Gadi

Shri Swaminarayan Mandir, San Francisco (Chapter)	
Location: Primary Deity: Constructed in: Architecture: Notes:	San Francisco - - - Laxminarayan Dev Spiritual Organisation: This Mandir comes under the LaxmiNarayan Dev Gadi

Shri Swaminarayan Mandir, Downey	
Location: Primary Deity: Constructed in: Architecture: Notes:	Downey; Laxminarayan Dev; 2000; Havli Style Structure with dome This Mandir comes under the LaxmiNarayan Dev Gadi

Shri Swaminarayan Mandir, San Jose, California (Chapter)	
Location: Primary Deity: Constructed in: Architecture: Notes:	San Jose, California - - - This Mandir comes under the NarNarayan Dev Gadi

Shri Swaminarayan Mandir, Sunnyvale, California	
Location: Primary Deity: Constructed in: Architecture: Notes:	San Jose, California - - - This Mandir comes under the LaxmiNarayan Dev Gadi

=== Connecticut ===
Shri Swaminarayan Mandir, West Hartford, Connecticut (Chapter)	
Location: Primary Deity: Constructed in: Architecture: Notes:	West Hartford, Connecticut - - - This Mandir comes under the LaxmiNarayan Dev Gadi

=== District of Columbia ===
Shri Swaminarayan Mandir, Washington, D.C. (Chapter)	
Location: Primary Deity: Constructed in: Architecture: Notes:	Washington, D.C. - - - This Mandir comes under the NarNarayan Dev Gadi

=== Florida ===
Shri Swaminarayan Mandir, Lakeland	
Location: Primary Deity: Constructed in: Architecture: Notes:	Lakeland; NarNarayan Dev - - This Mandir comes under the NarNarayan Dev Gadi (ISSO)

=== Georgia ===
Shri Swaminarayan Mandir, Atlanta	
Location: Primary Deity: Constructed in: Architecture: Notes:	Atlanta; Swaminarayan; 2007 - This Mandir comes under the NarNarayan Dev Gadi

Shri Swaminarayan Mandir, Bryon, Georgia (Chapter)	
Location: Primary Deity: Constructed in: Architecture: Notes:	Bryon, Georgia - - - This Mandir comes under the NarNarayan Dev Gadi

Shri Swaminarayan Mandir, Smyrna, Georgia (Chapter)	
Location: Primary Deity: Constructed in: Architecture: Notes:	Smyrna, Georgia - - - This Mandir comes under the LaxmiNarayan Dev Gadi

Shri Swaminarayan Mandir, Duluth, Georgia (Atlanta) (Chapter)	
Location: Primary Deity: Constructed in: Architecture: Notes:	Duluth, Georgia - - - This Mandir comes under the LaxmiNarayan Dev Gadi

=== Illinois ===
Shri Swaminarayan Mandir, Chicago (Itasca)	
Location: Primary Deity: Constructed in: Architecture: Notes:	Chicago; NarNarayan Dev; 1998; Tri-spire Structure; This Mandir comes under the NarNarayan Dev Gadi

Shri Swaminarayan Mandir, Chicago (Palatine)	
Location: Primary Deity: Constructed in: Architecture: Notes:	Palatine; Harikrushna Maharaj, Laxminarayan Dev; 2018 - This Mandir comes under the LaxmiNarayan Dev Gadi

Shri Swaminarayan Mandir, Chicago (Wheeling)	
Location: Primary Deity: Constructed in: Architecture: Notes:	Chicago; Ghanshyam Maharaj; 1991 - This Mandir comes under the LaxmiNarayan Dev Gadi

=== Kansas ===
Shri BAPS Swaminarayan Mandir, Kansas (Chapter)	
Location: Primary Deity: Constructed in: Architecture: Notes:	Kansas - - - This Mandir comes under the BAPS

=== Maryland ===
Shri Swaminarayan Mandir, Bowie, Maryland (Chapter)	
Location: Primary Deity: Constructed in: Architecture: Notes:	Bowie, Maryland - - - This Mandir comes under the LaxmiNarayan Dev Gadi

Shri Swaminarayan Mandir, Silver Spring, Maryland (Chapter)	
Location: Primary Deity: Constructed in: Architecture: Notes:	Silver Spring, Maryland - - - This Mandir comes under the LaxmiNarayan Dev Gadi

=== Massachusetts ===
Shri Swaminarayan Mandir, Lowell, Boston	
Location: Primary Deity: Constructed in: Architecture: Notes:	Lowell, Boston; Ghanshyam Maharaj, NarNarayan Dev and RadhaKrishna Dev; August 2006 - This Mandir comes under the NarNarayan Dev Gadi

=== Michigan ===
Shri Swaminarayan Mandir, Detroit	
Location: Primary Deity: Constructed in: Architecture: Notes:	Detroit; HariKrishna Maharaj; 2004 - This Mandir comes under the NarNarayan Dev Gadi

Shri Swaminarayan Mandir, Bloomfield Hills, Michigan (Chapter)	
Location: Primary Deity: Constructed in: Architecture: Notes:	Bloomfield Hills, Michigan - - - This Mandir comes under the LaxmiNarayan Dev Gadi

=== Missouri ===
Shri Swaminarayan Mandir, St. Louis, Missouri (Chapter)	
Location: Primary Deity: Constructed in: Architecture: Notes:	Bridgeton, Missouri - - - This Mandir comes under the BAPS

=== Mississippi ===
Shri Swaminarayan Mandir, Mississippi (Chapter)	
Location: Primary Deity: Constructed in: Architecture: Notes:	Mississippi - - - This Mandir comes under the NarNarayan Dev Gadi

=== New Jersey ===
Shri Swaminarayan Mandir, New Jersey (Colonia)	
Location: Primary Deity: Constructed in: Architecture: Notes:	New Jersey; Narnarayan Dev - - This Mandir comes under the NarNarayan Dev Gadi

Shri Swaminarayan Mandir, New Jersey (Weehawken)	
Location: Primary Deity: Constructed in: Architecture: Notes:	New Jersey; Swaminarayan; 1987 - This Mandir comes under the NarNarayan Dev Gadi

Shri Swaminarayan Mandir, New Jersey (Somerset)	
Location: Primary Deity: Constructed in: Architecture: Notes:	New Jersey; Laxminarayan Dev and Ranchhodrai - - This Mandir comes under the LaxmiNarayan Dev Gadi

Shri Swaminarayan Mandir, New Jersey (South Jersey)	
Location: Primary Deity: Constructed in: Architecture: Notes:	New Jersey; HariKrishna Maharaj - - This Mandir comes under the NarNarayan Dev Gadi

Shri Swaminarayan Mandir, New Jersey (Parsippany)	
Location: Primary Deity: Constructed in: Architecture: Notes:	New Jersey - - - This Mandir comes under the NarNarayan Dev Gadi

=== New York ===
Shri Swaminarayan Mandir, New York City (Chapter)	
Location: Primary Deity: Constructed in: Architecture: Notes:	New York City; Swaminarayan - - This Mandir comes under the NarNarayan Dev Gadi

=== North Carolina ===
Shri Swaminarayan Mandir, Raleigh, North Carolina (Chapter)	
Location: Primary Deity: Constructed in: Architecture: Notes:	Raleigh, North Carolina - - - This Mandir comes under the NarNarayan Dev Gadi

=== Ohio ===
Shri Swaminarayan Mandir, Cleveland	
Location: Primary Deity: Constructed in: Architecture: Notes:	Cleveland; RadhaKrishna Dev and HariKrishna Maharaj; 2008 - This Mandir comes under the NarNarayan Dev Gadi

Shri Swaminarayan Mandir, Cincinnati, Ohio (Chapter)	
Location: Primary Deity: Constructed in: Architecture: Notes:	Cincinnati, Ohio - - - This Mandir comes under the NarNarayan Dev Gadi

=== Pennsylvania ===
Shri Swaminarayan Temple - Hari Mandir, Telford (Chapter)	
Location: Primary Deity: Constructed in: Architecture: Notes:	Lansdale, Hatfield, Telford, Souderton, Sellersville, Philadelphia; Swaminarayan and Ghanshyam maharaj 2015 - This Mandir comes under the Vadtal Gadi

Shri Swaminarayan Mandir, Philadelphia (Chapter)	
Location: Primary Deity: Constructed in: Architecture: Notes:	Philadelphia - - - This Mandir comes under the NarNarayan Dev Gadi

Shri Swaminarayan Mandir, King of Prussia, Pennsylvania (Chapter)	
Location: Primary Deity: Constructed in: Architecture: Notes:	King of Prussia, Pennsylvania - - - This Mandir comes under the LaxmiNarayan Dev Gadi

=== Texas ===
Shri Swaminarayan Mandir, Houston	
Location: Primary Deity: Constructed in: Architecture: Notes:	Houston; RadhaKrishna Dev - - This Mandir comes under the NarNarayan Dev Gadi

Shri Swaminarayan Mandir, Grand Prairie (Dallas)	
Location: Primary Deity: Constructed in: Architecture: Notes:	Grand Prairie; Ghanshyam Maharaj; 4 July 1991 - This Mandir comes under the LaxmiNarayan Dev Gadi

Vadtal Dham Shree Swaminarayan Hindu Temple, Richmond, Texas	
Location: Primary Deity: Constructed in: Architecture: Notes:	Richmond, Texas; Harikrishna Maharaj; 2022 - This Mandir comes under the LaxmiNarayan Dev Gadi

Shri Swaminarayan Mandir, Pflugerville (Austin)	
Location: Primary Deity: Constructed in: Architecture: Notes:	Pflugerville, Texas - - - This Mandir comes under the LaxmiNarayan Dev Gadi

== Zambia ==
Shri Swaminarayan Mandir, Lusaka (SKSS)	
Location: Primary Deity: Constructed in: Architecture: Notes:	Lusaka - - - This Mandir comes under the NarNarayan Dev Gadi- Shri Kutch Satsang Swaminarayan

Shri Swaminarayan Mandir, Lusaka (LSSM)	
Location: Primary Deity: Constructed in: Architecture: Notes:	Lusaka - - - This Mandir comes under the LaxmiNarayan Dev Gadi – Lusaka Swaminarayan Satsang Mandal
