= Shri Swaminarayan Mandir, New Jersey =

The following Swaminarayan temples are located in the U.S. state of New Jersey:

- Shree Swaminarayan Temple, New Jersey (Secaucus)
- Shri Swaminarayan Mandir, New Jersey (Colonia)
- Shri Swaminarayan Mandir, New Jersey (South Jersey)
- Shri Swaminarayan Mandir, New Jersey (Weehawken)
- Shri Swaminarayan Mandir, New Jersey (Somerset)
- Shri Swaminarayan Mandir, New Jersey (Parsippany)
