= Shri Swaminarayan Mandir, Chicago =

The following Swaminarayan temples are located in the area of Chicago, Illinois:

- Shri Swaminarayan Mandir, Chicago (Itasca), in Itasca, Illinois
- Shri Swaminarayan Mandir, Chicago (Wheeling), in Wheeling, Illinois
