= Shri Swaminarayan Mandir, Nairobi =

The following Swaminarayan temples are located in the area of Nairobi:

- Shri Swaminarayan Mandir, Nairobi (EASS Temple), of the East Africa Satsang Swaminarayan
- Shri Swaminarayan Mandir, Nairobi (SKSS Temple), of the Shri Kutch Satsang Swaminarayan
