= Akha Bhagat =

Gujarati poet

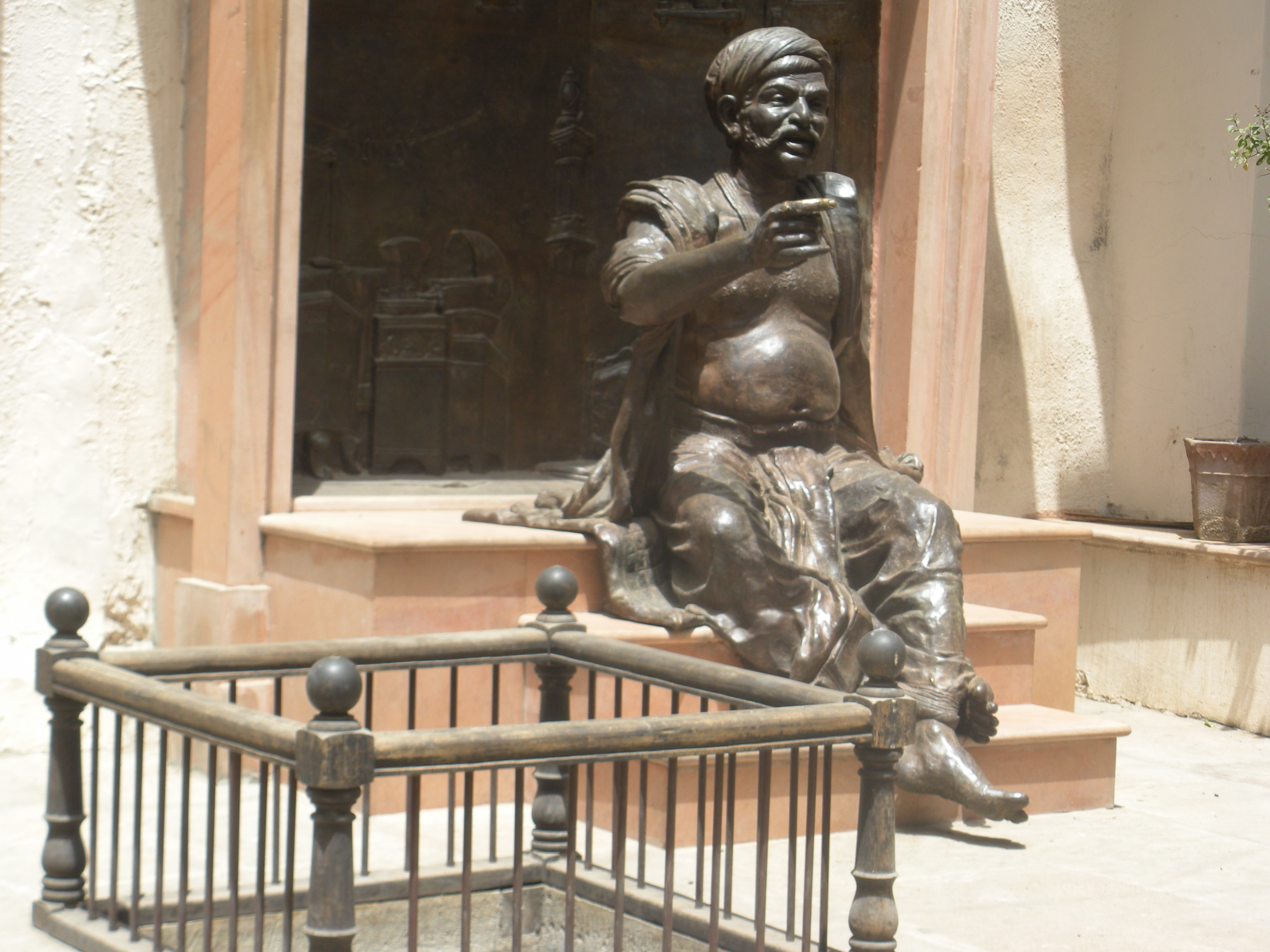
Statue of Akho located in walled city of Ahmedabad

Akha Bhagat (commonly known as Akho; c. 1591 – c. 1656) or Akha Rahiyadas Soni was a medieval Gujarati poet who wrote in the tradition of the Bhakti movement. He wrote his poems in a literary form called Chhappa (six stanza satirical poems).

== Life ==
His exact dates are unknown, but according to scholars he lived from 1591 to 1656. A goldsmith by profession, he lived near Ahmedabad in Jetalpur, and later moved to Ahmedabad. His residence in Ahmedabad which is small room in Desaini Pol at Khadia is known as Akha no Ordo (literally "A room of Akha"). Akho was a goldsmith belonging to Hindu Soni caste and sub-caste Pasawala (Dhanpat). In Rajkot, Kothariya naka (one of the gate of fort) Chowk named after him Akha Bhagat Chowk. Soni Bazar Starts from here. He was a disciple of Saint Gokulnath, grandson of Vallabhacharya, and got inspiration to go towards the way of Bhakti from him. He shared his experience and knowledge in chhappa. The poetry writing style he followed for lending his philosophy in verse. He wrote 755 chappas.

== Works ==
He is regarded as most important poet of mediaeval Gujarati literature. Three of his works are dated including Panchikarana (1645; Mixture of five elements), Gurushishyasamvada (1645; A Dialogue between Teacher and a Pupil) and Akhe-gita, among which, Akhe-gita is considered as an important work. Divided in forty Kadavuns (sections), it deals with Bhakti (worship) and Jnana (knowledge). His other works includes Chittavichar Samvada, Santona Lakshano, Anubhav Bindu ("A Drop of Experience"), Avasthanirupan', Kaivalya Gita, as well as various Pada (poems) and Chhappa.

His Chhappa, a six stanza poems, are full of humorous and passes metaphorical comments on different aspects of spirituality and human life.
