= Naranarayan =

Naranarayan is a Sanskrit term, nara means human being and Narayana is another name for Vishnu. Nara-Narayana are sages in Hinduism who were the twin brother incarnation of Vishnu. In the Mahabharata, Arjuna has been identified with Nara and Krishna with Narayana.

Naranarayan may also refer to:

- Nara Narayan, the second and the last Koch dynasty ruler of the medieval Kamata Kingdom of Assam, India
- Naranarayan Setu, bridge in Bongaigaon, Assam, India
- Nar Narayan Dev Gadi, sect of the Swaminarayan Sampradaya tradition of Hinduism
  - Narnarayan Dev Yuvak Mandal, its youth wing
  - Narnarayan Shastri Institute of Technology, Jetalpur, Gujarat, India
