= Shri Swaminarayan Mandir, Oldham =

Hindu temple in Oldham, UK

Coordinates: 53°31′57″N 2°6′57″W

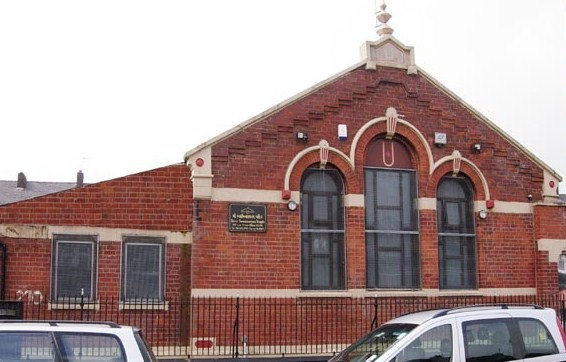
The temple

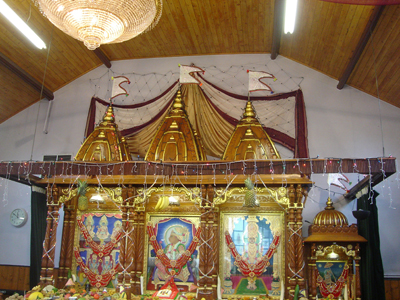
Central altar

Shree Swaminarayan Mandir, Oldham is a Swaminarayan Hindu temple in Oldham, England. It became the third Swaminarayan temple to open in the United Kingdom under the NarNarayan Dev Gadi of the Swaminarayan Sampraday on 22 October 1977.

== 30th Anniversary ==
In 2007 over 2,500 people, including the mayor of Oldham, celebrated the temple's thirtieth anniversary.

== 40th Anniversary ==
End of July 2017 to start of August 2017
