= Ghela =

River in India (Gujarat)

Coordinates: 21.97°N 71.58°E

The River Ghela is a river that runs through the town of Gadhada in the Indian state of Gujarat. The Ghela river originates from the Jasdan hills, near Fulzar village in the Jasdan district and flows into the Arabian sea. Its length is 118 km and its catchment area is 622 km^{2}. The Ghelo Somnath Dam and the Ghelo Itaria Dam are situated on this river having 60 km^{2} and 104 km^{2} catchment area respectively.

This river was heavily visited by Swaminarayan and is considered to be one of the holiest rivers by the Swaminarayan Sampradya. The Swaminarayan Gopinathdev Mandir and the BAPS Swaminarayan Mandir are both located near this river.

== See also ==
- Shri Swaminarayan Mandir, Gadhada
