= Shri Swaminarayan Mandir, Nairobi (EASS Temple) =

East Africa Satsang Swaminarayan Temple (EASSTemple)
- East Africa Satsang Swaminarayan Temple
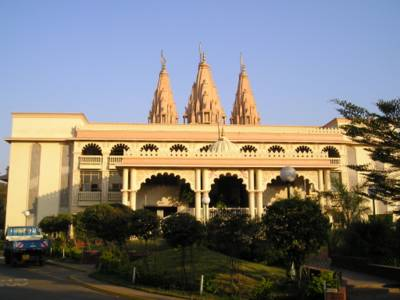

Religion
- Affiliation: Hinduism
- District: Parklands
- Deity: Swaminarayan

Location
- Location: Nairobi
- State: Nairobi
- Country: Kenya
- Interactive map of East Africa Satsang Swaminarayan Temple (EASSTemple)
- Coordinates: 1°16′6″S 36°48′58″E

Architecture
- Established: Year 1932
- Completed: Year 1945
- Monument: 7

Website
- www.easstemple.com

The oldest Swaminarayan Organisation in Kenya, founded in Nairobi in 1932, as East Africa Satsang Mandal, to serve as a meeting point for all Swaminarayan Devotees in the Region. The East Africa Swaminarayan Satsang Temple, Nairobi was built in 1945. It was the first Swaminarayan temple to be built outside the Indian subcontinent as well as the first on the continent of Africa.

== History of this temple ==
Pictorial images of Swaminarayan were consecrated in India and were then shipped to Nairobi in 1945. In 1957, Acharya Maharajshree Tejendraprasad Pande (in his Pre-Acharya status) on behalf of his father (who was then Acharya), visited the temple for the first time and installed images of Swaminarayan in the ladies section.
