= Shri Swaminarayan Mandir, New Jersey (Weehawken) =

Hindu temple in New Jersey

Coordinates: 40°46′34″N 74°00′54″W

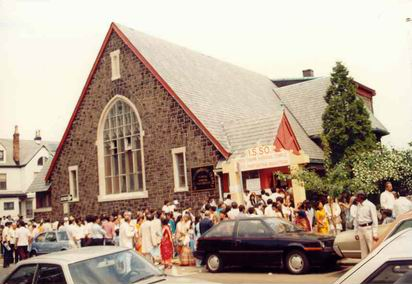
- The first Swaminarayan Temple of the Narnarayan Gadi in USA

Religion
- Affiliation: Hinduism
- Deity: Swaminarayan and Narnarayan Dev

Location
- Location: Weehawken
- State: New Jersey
- Country: United States
- Interactive map of Shri Swaminarayan Mandir, New Jersey (Weehawken)

Architecture
- Completed: May 24, 1987

Website
- http://weehawken.issousa.org/

The Swaminarayan Mandir in Weehawken, New Jersey is the first Swaminarayan temple of the Narnarayan Gadi in the United States. It is the national headquarters of the ISSO and comes under the NarNarayan Dev Gadi of the Swaminarayan Sampraday. Today there are four Swaminarayan temples in New Jersey alone.

== History of ISSO in New Jersey ==
The first Dev Mandir in the United States was set up in the basement of a house of a devotee in New Jersey in 1981. The Dev Mandir existed here until 1986.

== History of this temple ==
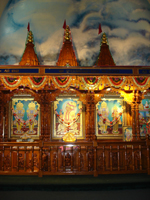
Central Altar of the temple

The Historical Landmark, First Church Of Christian Scientist, was purchased in Weehawken, New Jersey on the bank of Hudson River with a view of the high-rise buildings of New York City in 1986. On May 24, 1987, Acharya Shree Tejendraprasadji Maharaj conducted the Murti Pratishtha ceremony (invocation of gods) in the first Swaminarayan Temple in USA at Weehawken. Swaminarayan occupies the principal seat of this temple. The occasion was celebrated by satsangis from various parts of the USA, UK, Africa and India.

The procession with the idols began at Colonial Park, West New York on Boulevard East, overseeing the bank of Hudson River. With extraordinary floats and the Weehawken Mayor Mr. Richard F. Turner as Guest of Honor and assemblyman Mr. Octovio Alfonso in presence the procession began towards the temple.

== See also ==
- Swaminarayan
- Swaminarayan Sampraday
