= Shree Kutch Satsang Swaminarayan Temple =

Coordinates: 53.5651°N 2.4461°W

Shree Kutch Satsang Swaminarayan Temple - Bolton
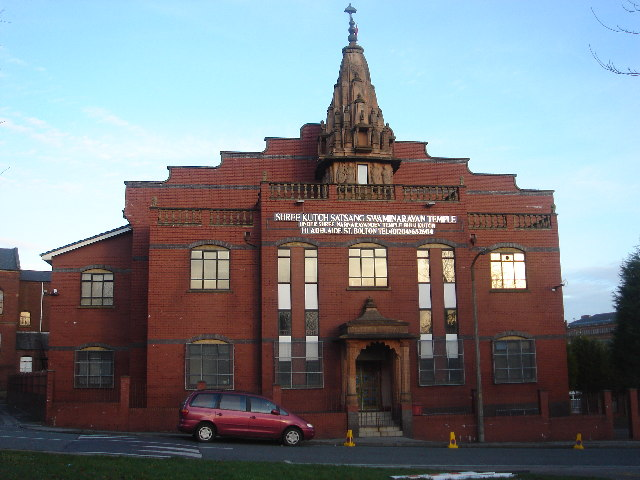

Religion
- Affiliation: Hinduism
- Deity: Swaminarayan

Location
- Location: Greater Manchester
- Country: England
- Interactive map of Shree Kutch Satsang Swaminarayan Temple - Bolton

Architecture
- Established: 1973
- Completed: 1993

Shree Kutch Satsang Swaminarayan Temple (Bolton) is a three storied Swaminarayan Temple on Adelaide Street in Bolton, Greater Manchester, England. It is the first Swaminarayan temple to be established in the UK and Europe, officially opening in 1973. On 6 September 1973 a constitution was registered for the Temple under the Place of Worship Act, and on 6 September 1975 specially prepared murtis from the head Temple in Bhuj were installed in the Temple. The original structure was demolished and rebuilt in 1993. Prior to the new building a labour club and terraced houses were present on the temple site.

== Significant milestones at the Temple ==
In 1982 the temple was graced by the first visit of saints from Shree Swaminarayan Mandir - Bhuj. Mahant Swami Shree Hariswarupdasji along with Sadguru Swami Shree Murlimanohardasji and 3 others visited at this time. During this year the Gujarati school was established.

Between 1982 and 1988, it became apparent that the current building was too small;in 1988 Sadguru Shree Murlimanohardasji Swami visited the Bolton Temple and gave his blessings for a new temple to be built, and plans for a new building were drawn up.

In early 1992 construction of the new Temple building had commenced. The building was visited by 1008 Shree Tejendraprasadji Maharaj and his son, Lalji Maharaj, 108 Shree Koshelendraprasadji Maharaj.

The official opening of the new temple took place on 6 September 1993, on this day the Murti Pratishta took place. Those present included 1008 Shree Tejendraprasadji Maharaj, Mahant Swami Shree Hariswarupdasji, Sadguru Swami Shree Dharmakishordasji, Sadguru Swami Shree Ghanshyamjivandasji, Sadguru Swami Shree Madhavpriyadasji, and many other Swamis from the Shree NarNarayan Desh - Bhuj and Ahmedabad Temples.

== 35th Anniversary ==
As part of the 35th anniversary celebrations the temple teamed up with the Big Bolton Health Check, a campaign that aimed to reduce heart attacks and disease in Bolton. The temple comes under the NarNarayan Dev Gadi of the Swaminarayan Sampraday.

== 40th Anniversary ==
Prior to the 40th anniversary celebrations significant renovation and refurbishment works took place at the temple in preparation for the buildup to September

The anniversary week saw a number of events take place including a large scale yagna, bhajan show and a parade through Bolton which was attended by over 2,500 people including visitors from Kenya and Australia. The Mayor and Mayoress of Bolton were in attendance for parts of the celebration.
