= Narnarayan Shastri Institute of Technology =

Coordinates: 23.259139°N 72.653704°E

Narnarayan Shastri Institute of Technology, Jetalpur.
- Motto: Education for the world, Research for the future
- Type: Engineering and Nursing College
- Established: 2008
- Affiliations: All India Council of Technical Education (AICTE); Gujarat Technological University (GTU)
- Principal: Dr. Sanjay Joshi
- Undergraduates: 1800
- Postgraduates: 100
- Location: Narnarayan Shastri Institute of Technology, Swaminarayan Gurukul, Jetalpur, Ahmedabad-382028, Kheda, Gujarat, India
- Website: http://www.nsitgurukul.com/

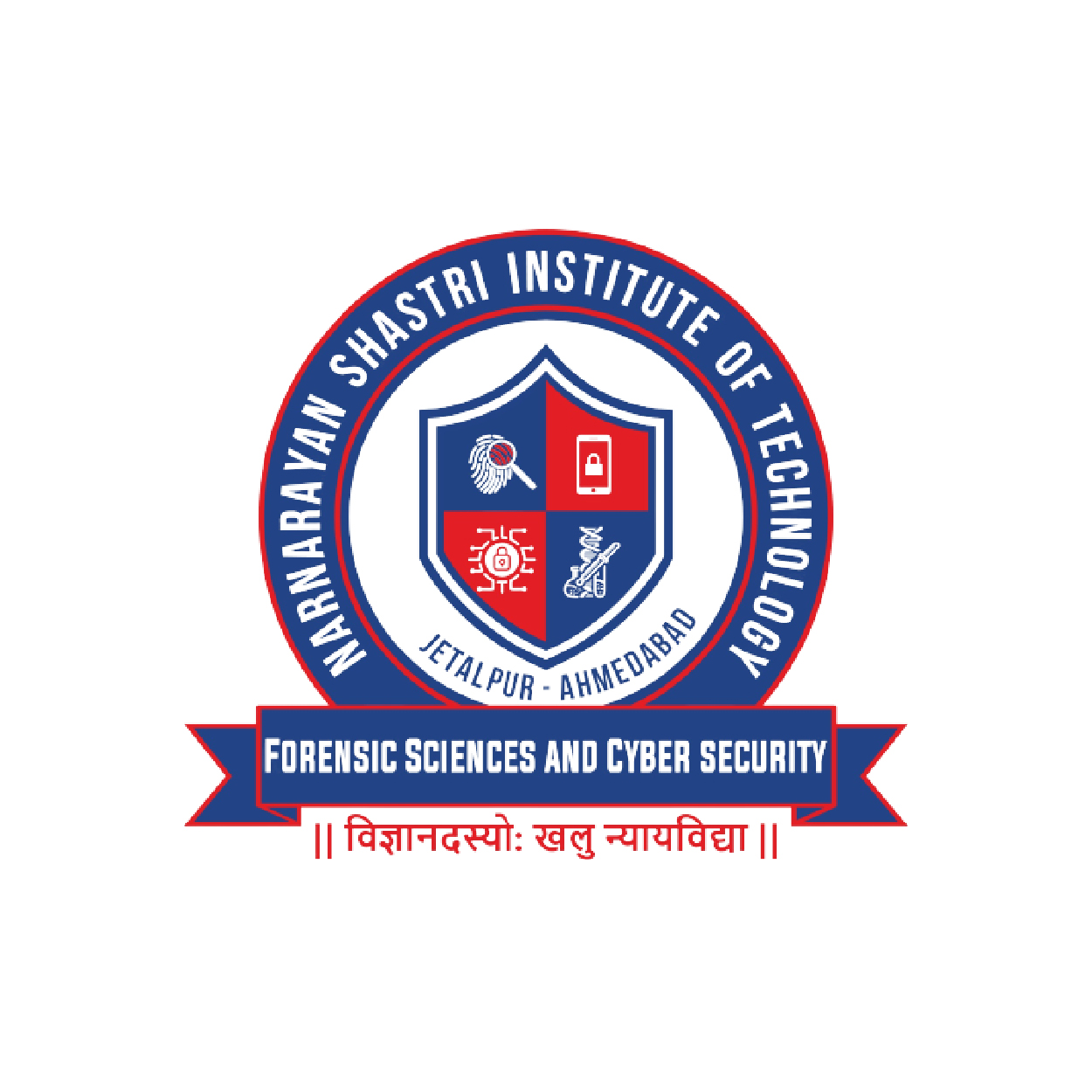
Narnarayan Shastri Institute Of Technology (NSIT) - Institute of Forensic Sciences and Cyber Security (IFSCS), Jetalpur, Ahmedabad

Narnarayan Shastri Institute of Technology is an engineering college in the town of Jetalpur very near to the city of Ahmedabad, Gujarat, India. The academic program of Narnarayan Shastri Institute of Technology is approved by the All India Council of Technical Education (AICTE) and is affiliated with Gujarat Technological University (GTU)

== About ==
The institute is established in 2008. The institute is blessed by Acharya Shree Koshlendraprasadji Maharaj and Acharya Shree Tejendraprasadji Maharaj and is connected with Shree Swaminarayan Temple - Kalupur. It is functioning under "Swaminarayan Vividh Seva Niketan Trust - Jetalpur". It admits students from all over the Gujarat as well as other states of India to the Bachelor of Engineering. The academic program of NSIT is approved by the All India Council of Technical Education (AICTE) and is affiliated to Gujarat Technological University (GTU).

At its establishment in 2008, the institute comprised Mechanical Engineering Electrical Engineering, Electronics and Communication Engineering and Computer Science Engineering. Thereafter the institute has been expanded with inclusion of two new departments in the fields of Civil Engineering and Automobile Engineering..

== Departments ==
=== UG Programmes ===
The institute offers undergraduate courses in eight branches of engineering and thus is the training ground for the would-be technocrats. The under graduate programs in the institute uses pedagogy which infuses practical learning through industry based project and application based approach to the theoretical concepts.
The college offers six undergraduate courses leading to Bachelor of Engineering (B.E.) degrees:

- Mechanical engineering
- Computer Science and Engineering (CSE)
- Electronics and Communications Engineering
- Electrical engineering
- Civil engineering
- Automobile Engineering

=== PG Programmes ===
The college offers two postgraduate courses leading to Master of Engineering (M.E.) degrees:

- Thermal Engineering
- Computer Science and Engineering (CSE)

== Campus ==
The Institute campus extends over large area and is situated close to Swaminarayan Mandir - Jetalpur. The campus is divided into various functional zones like hostel, Main College Building, Administration Block. In addition to Lecture Rooms, tutorial rooms and drawing halls, the institute has an Auditorium, library, computer centre, reading rooms, workshops and laboratories. The college has playgrounds and gymnasium.

== Facilities ==
The college has computer labs with more than 168 computers, a Workshop and with laboratories. There is library to provide books to students and faculty, and a canteen as well sports room with Tablet Tennis, Chess Board, Carom and Gymnasium. There is an auditorium is used for technical events, lectures and seminars.

Students of Computer Science and Engineering department has developed own "Result" Portal system for result announcement NSIT result portal system
