= Shri Swaminarayan Mandir, Chicago (Itasca) =

Coordinates: 41°58′38.2″N 88°02′58.4″W

Shri Swaminarayan Temple
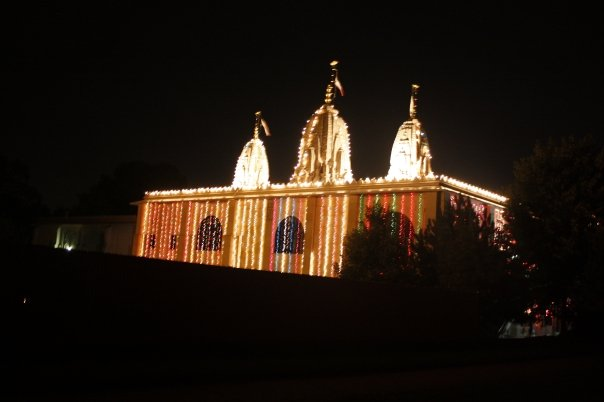
- The temple lit up during 10th anniversary celebrations (2008)

Religion
- Affiliation: Hinduism
- Deity: Radha Krishna with Swaminarayan in the form of Hari Krishna

Location
- Location: Chicago
- State: Illinois
- Country: United States
- Interactive map of Shri Swaminarayan Temple

Architecture
- Completed: 2 August 1998

Shree Swaminarayan Temple, Chicago, IL is a Swaminarayan Hindu temple located in the Chicago suburb of Itasca. Opened in 1998, it comes under ISSO of the Nar Narayan Dev Gadi (Swaminarayan Sampraday). It was built at the cost of $10 million, reportedly the most expensive Hindu temple in the Midwest at that time.

== History ==
Acharya Maharajshree Tejendraprasad Pande inaugurated the temple on 2 August 1998. It is the first Shikharband Swaminarayan temple in the USA. The temple boasts of marriage and banquet facilities and is 34,000 square feet (3,200 m^{2}) in size. The temple claims to have devotees from Islam, Christianity and Buddhism apart from Hindus.

== 10th Anniversary ==
The temple celebrated its 10th anniversary in 2008 with carnival games and raffles, Indian craft exhibits, henna temporary tattoos, historical exhibits, guided tours of the temple, live dance performances and native foods. Indian culture was the focal point of the nine-day celebrations. The celebration culminated with a mile long procession with 3 floats attended by people from different parts of the United States, India and England. Of the three floats, the first had children in a cultural representation, the second had pictorial representation of Swaminarayan, with a bejeweled umbrella on the top of the float and the last one had Acharya Maharajshree Koshalendraprasad Pande, the current acharya of the Nar Narayan Dev Gadi who attended the festivities and ascetics. During the two-hour procession, women in swirling jewel-toned saris danced to a rhythmic beat on traditional drums. Eleven different cultural performances were organized by temple youth as part of the procession. Officials expected 5000 people to take part in this celebration.
