= Shri Swaminarayan Mandir, New Jersey (Colonia) =

Hindu temple in New Jersey

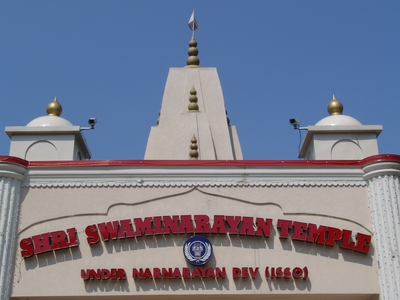
- The shikhars of the temple

- Location in New Jersey

Religion
- Affiliation: Hinduism
- Deity: Nar Narayan

Location
- State: New Jersey
- Country: United States
- Interactive map of Shri Swaminarayan Mandir, New Jersey (Colonia)
- Coordinates: 40.6051°N 74.3129°W

Architecture
- Completed: 4 September 2005

The Swaminarayan Mandir, New Jersey (Colonia) is a Swaminarayan temple that comes under ISSO (Nar Narayan Dev Gadi of the Swaminarayan Sampraday), located in the Colonia section of Woodbridge Township in Middlesex County, New Jersey, United States. It was officially inaugurated by Acharya Maharajshree Koshalendraprasad Pande on the 4th of September 2005.

== History ==
This temple replaced Temple Ohev Shalom, once a Jewish place of worship which was closed due to a dwindling population of Jews in the area. Originally slated to become a residential complex after the closure of the Jewish temple, the temple administration came to an agreement with the builder to build this temple with the support of the town residents.

The four walls of the main interior room and the concrete slab of the floor are the only things that remained unchanged; everything else was refurbished to make way for the new temple, which was completed through a combination of volunteers and paid workers. The dome above the temple was constructed by the builder who created it from a photograph. When the temple opened, there was a week of ceremonies, involving recital of scriptures. This culminated with the inauguration on the 4th of September, 2005, which was witnessed by people from around the world.

The temple is the first and only Swaminarayan temple outside India to have the twin form of Nar Narayan as central deities. It is also one of the first in the US to have domes (or shikhars). The image of Nar Narayan is a replica of that installed by Swaminarayan at the world's first Swaminarayan temple in Ahmedabad. It was the eighth Swaminarayan temple to be built in the USA. There are twenty temples in the US as of 2009.

== Gallery ==
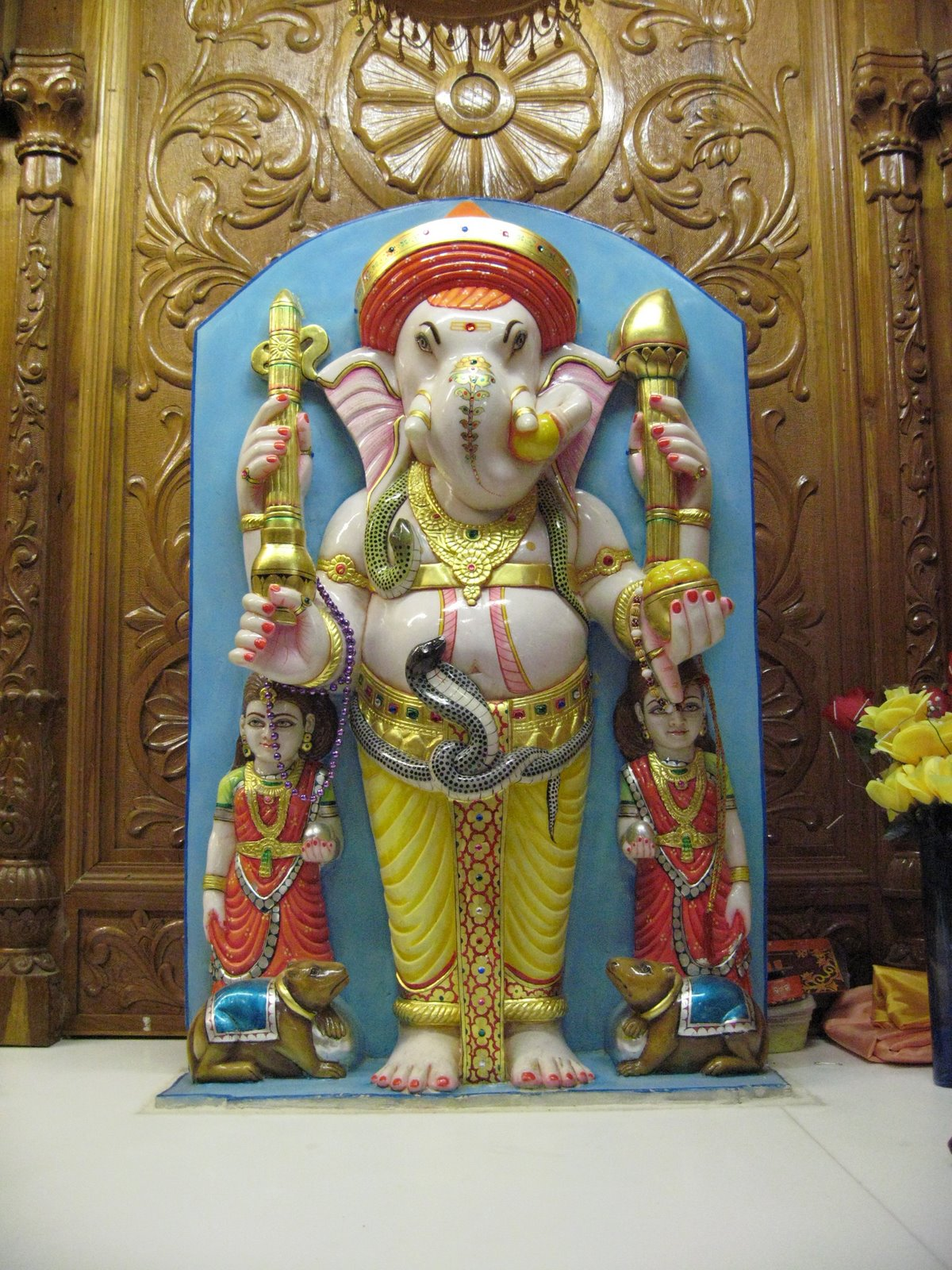
Ganesh

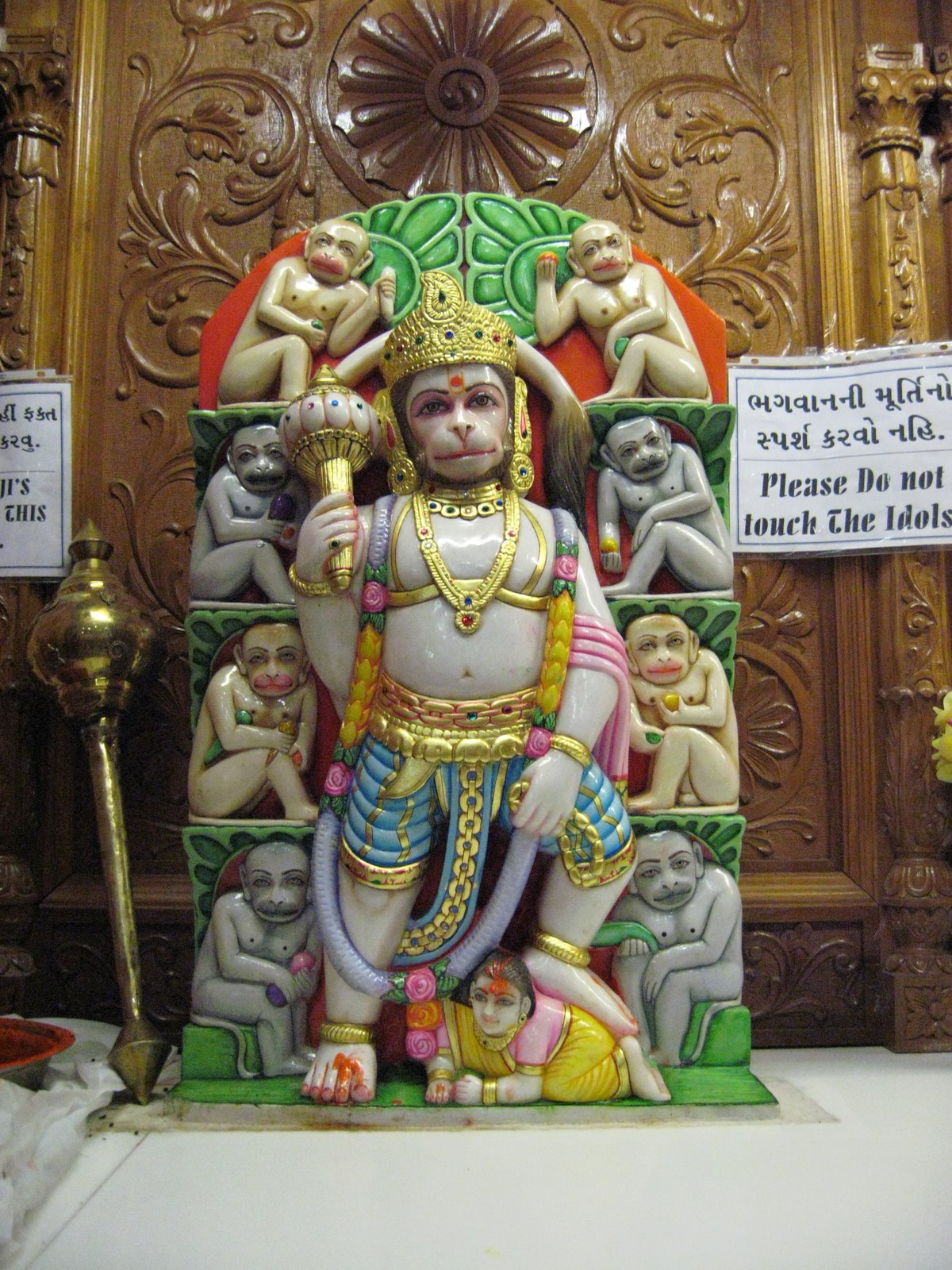
Hanuman

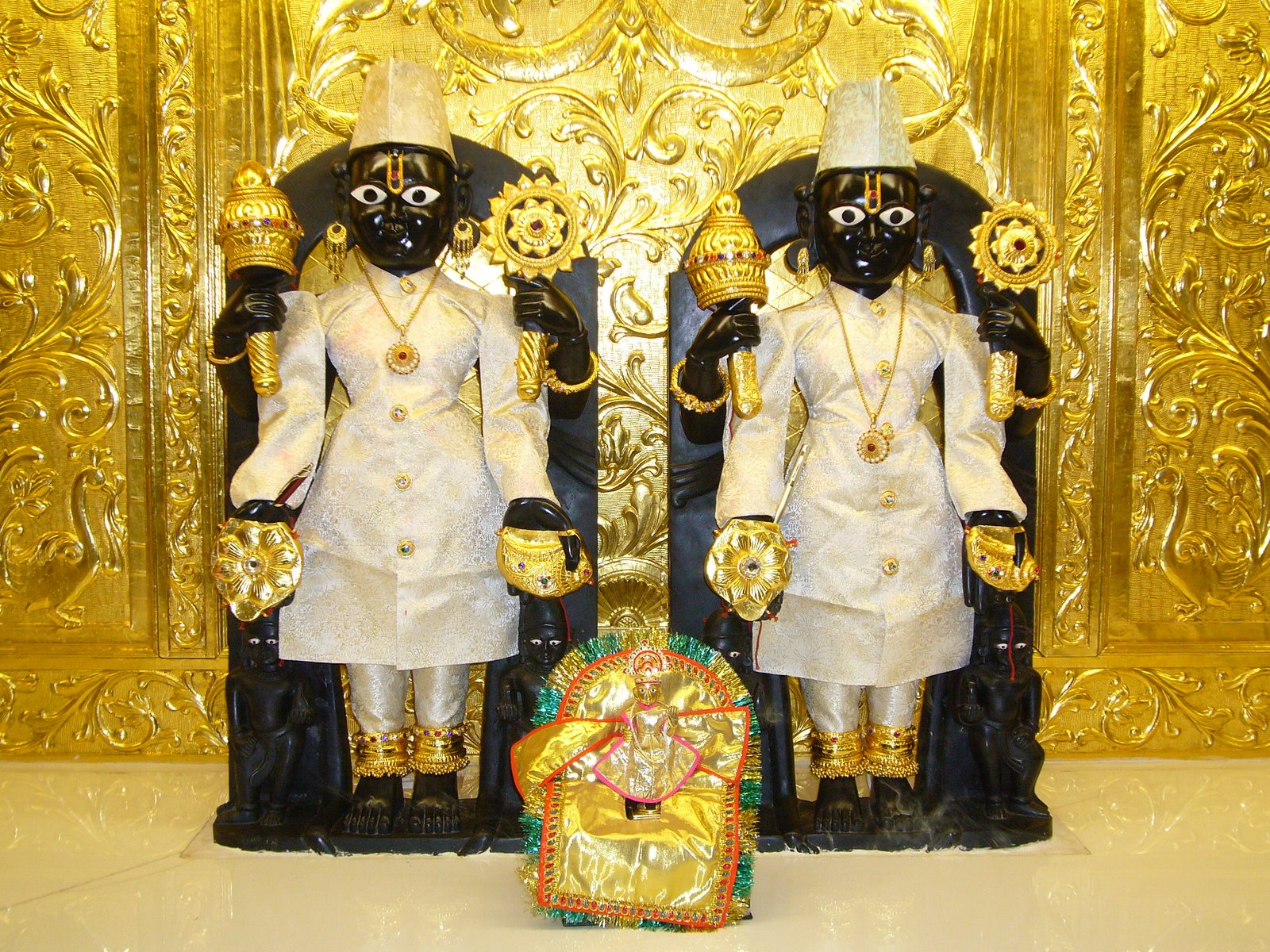
First image of Nar Narayan in twin form in a Swaminarayan temple outside India

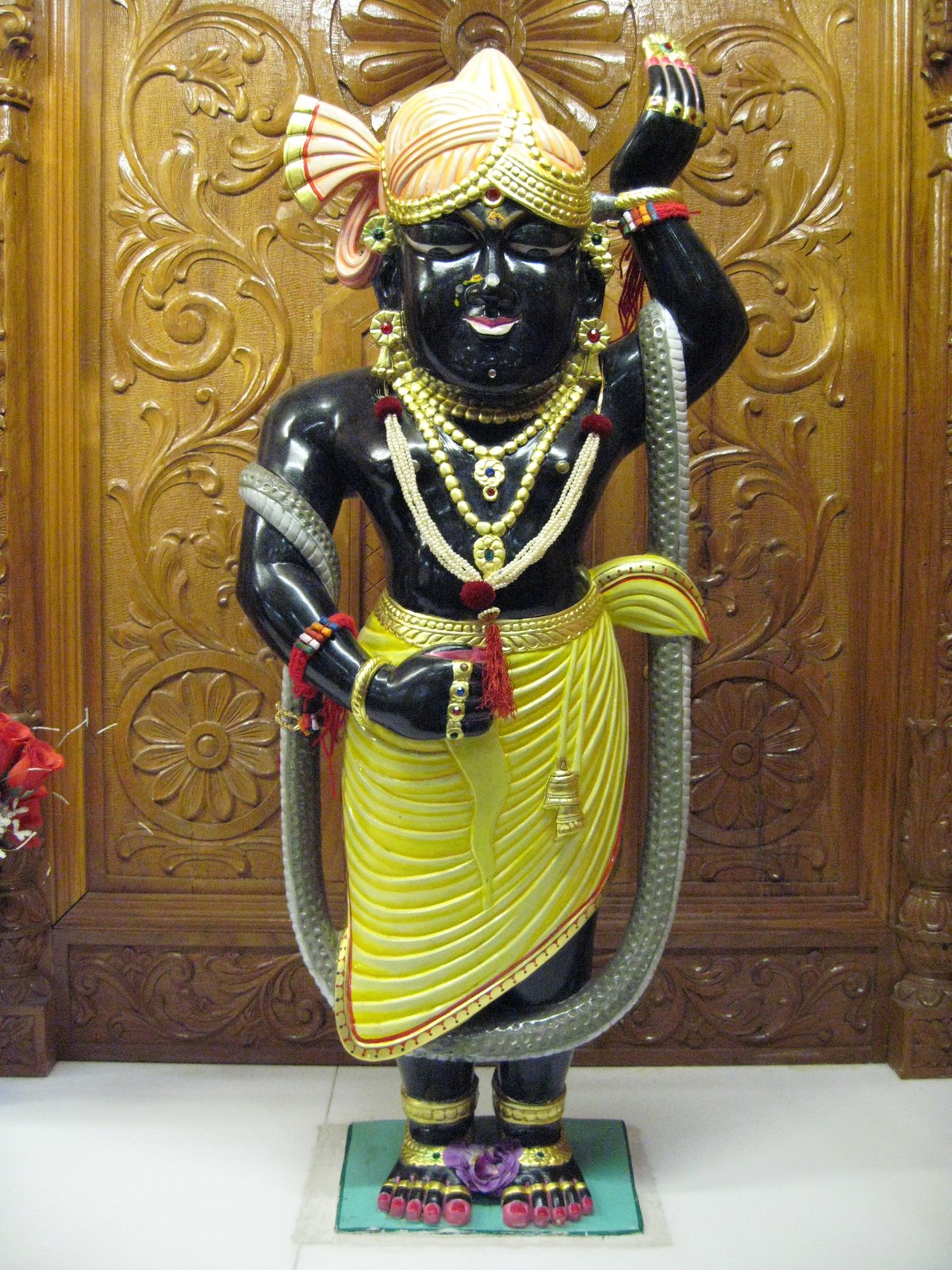
Shreenathji

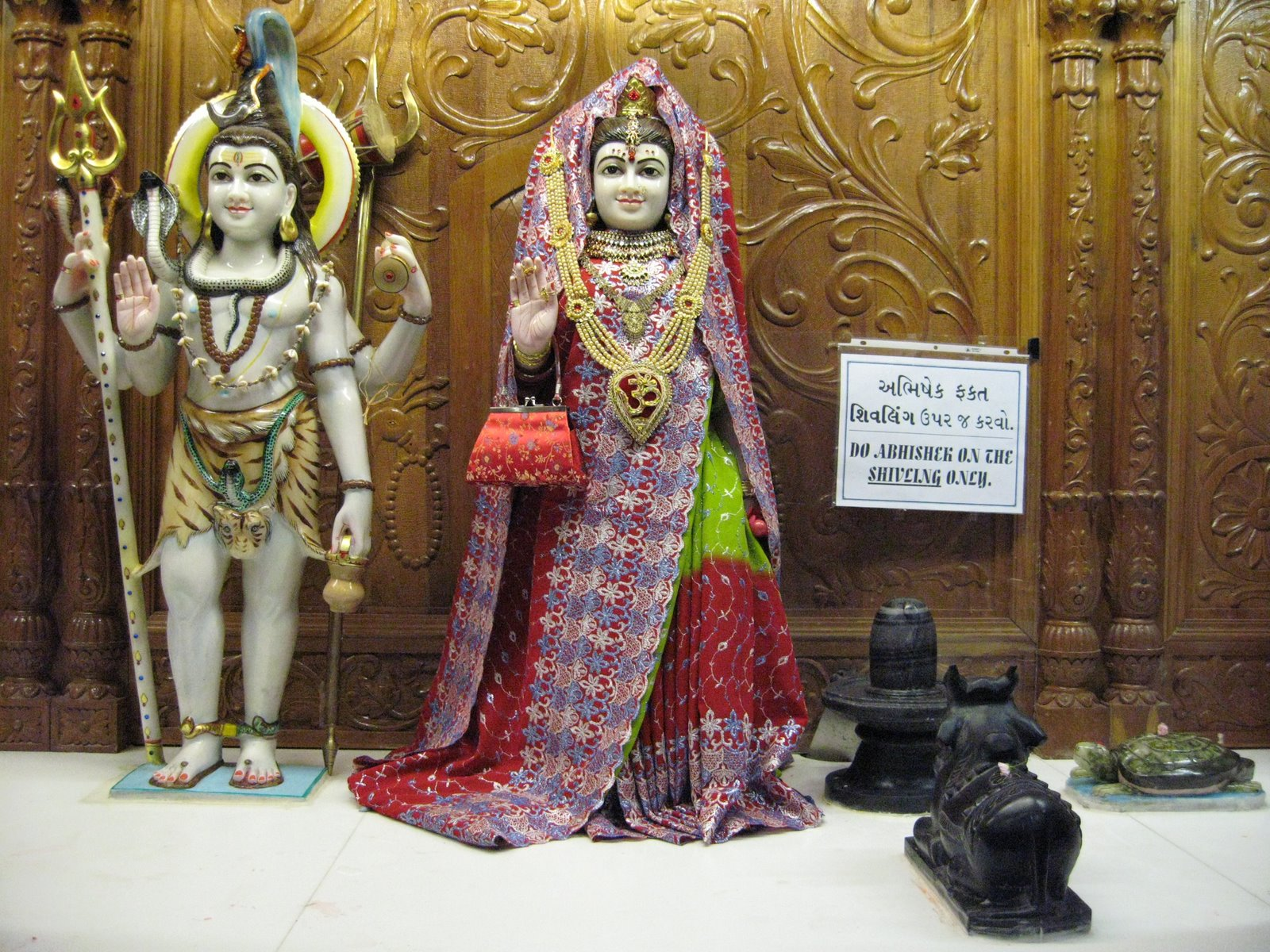
Shiva in the form of Nilkanth Mahadev with his consort, Parvati

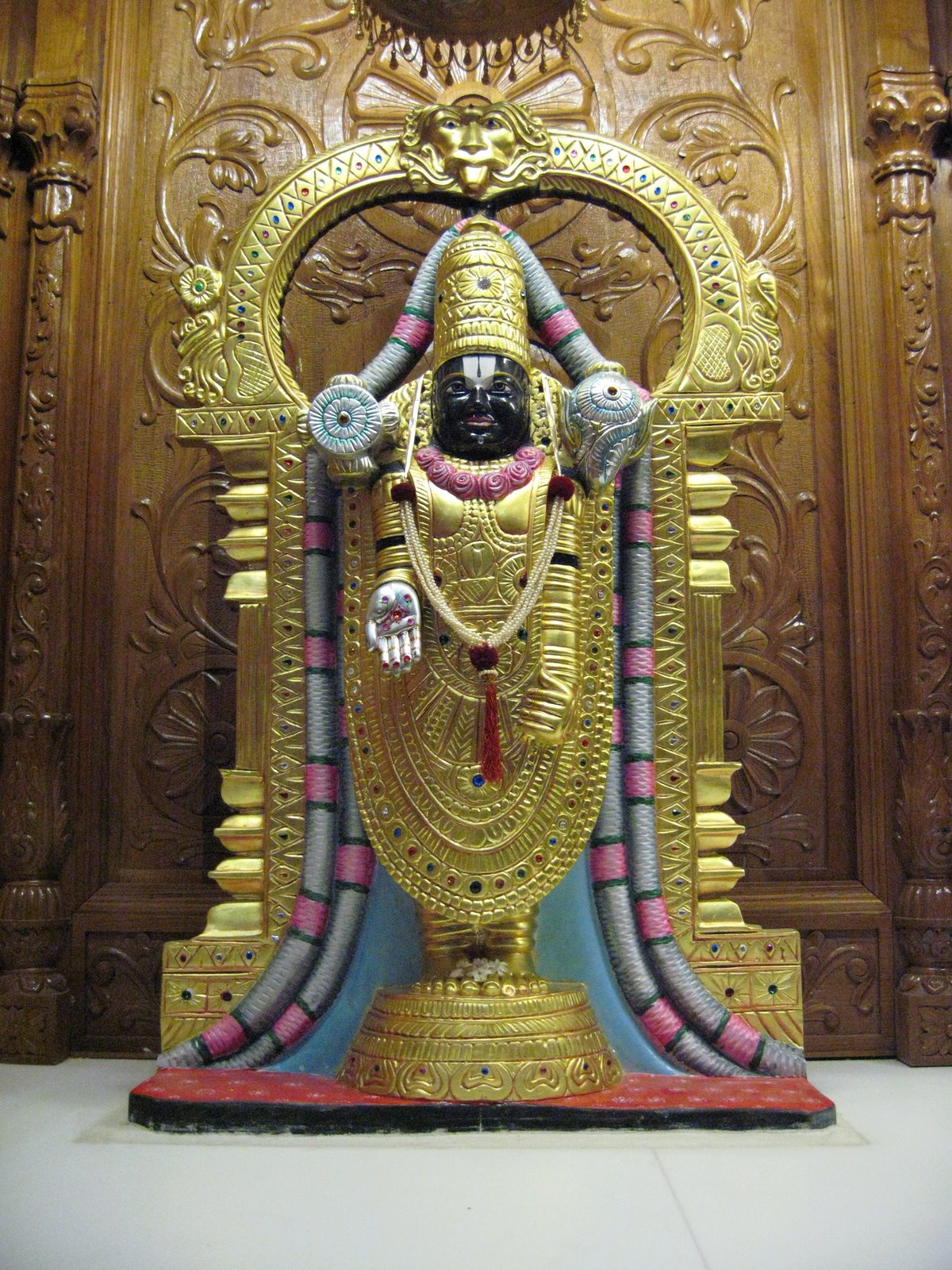
Balaji

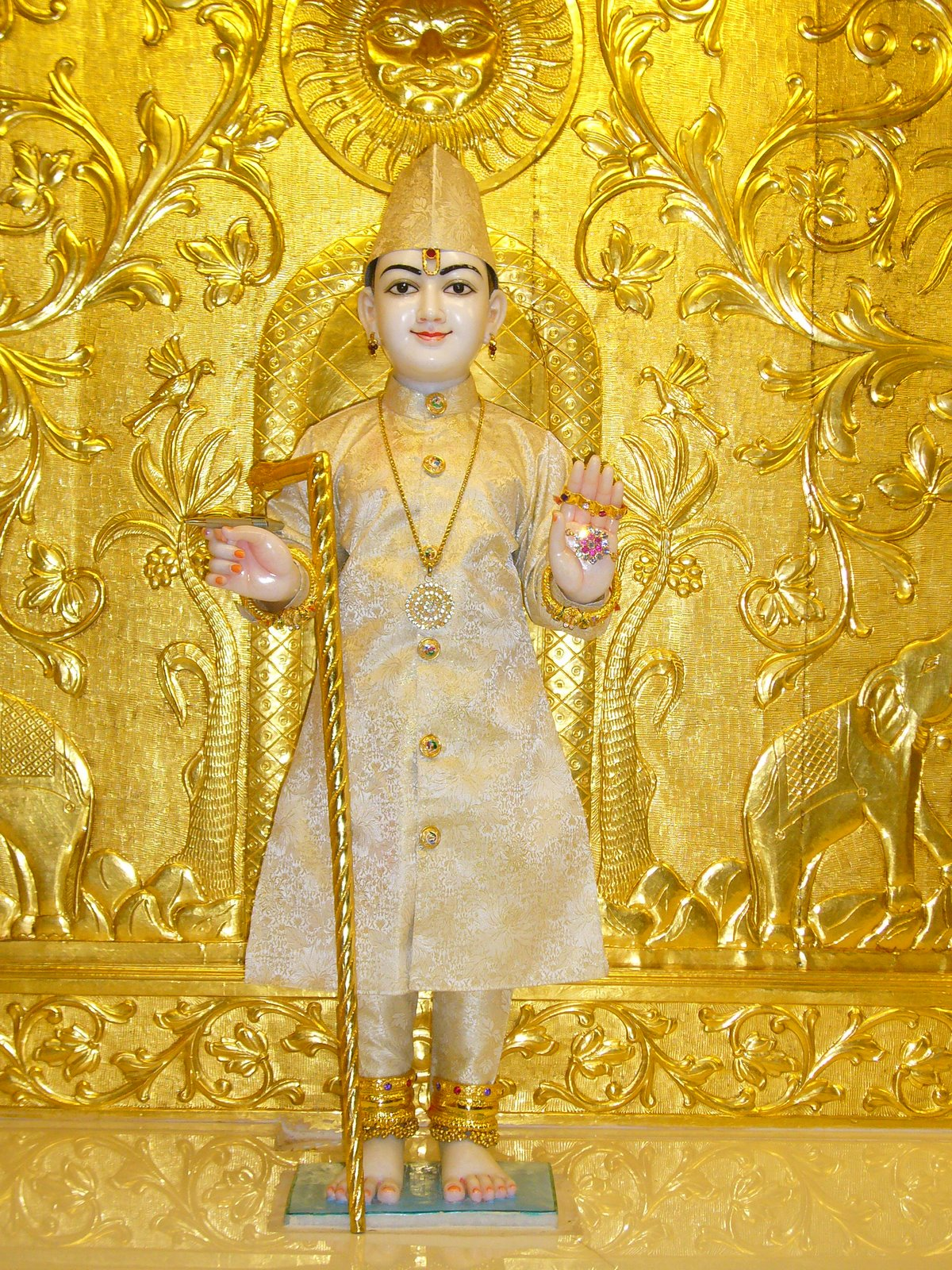
Swaminarayan in the form of Ghanshyam

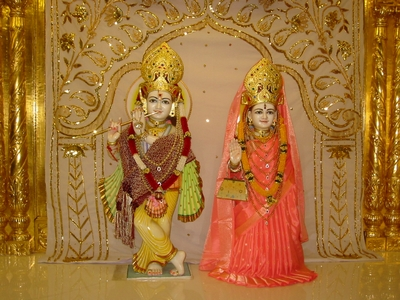
Radha Krishna

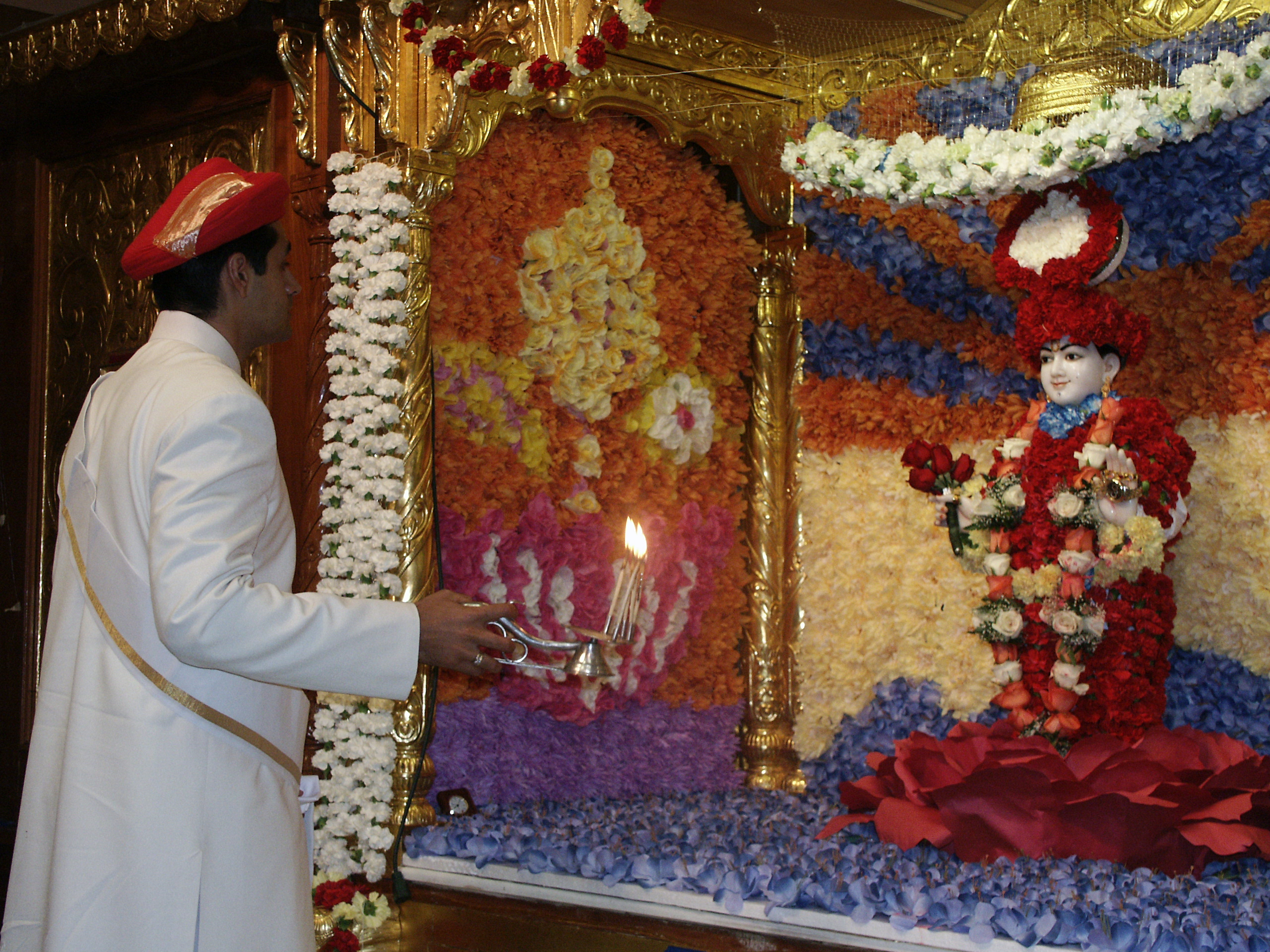
Acharya Maharajshree Koshalendraprasad Pande performing Aarti

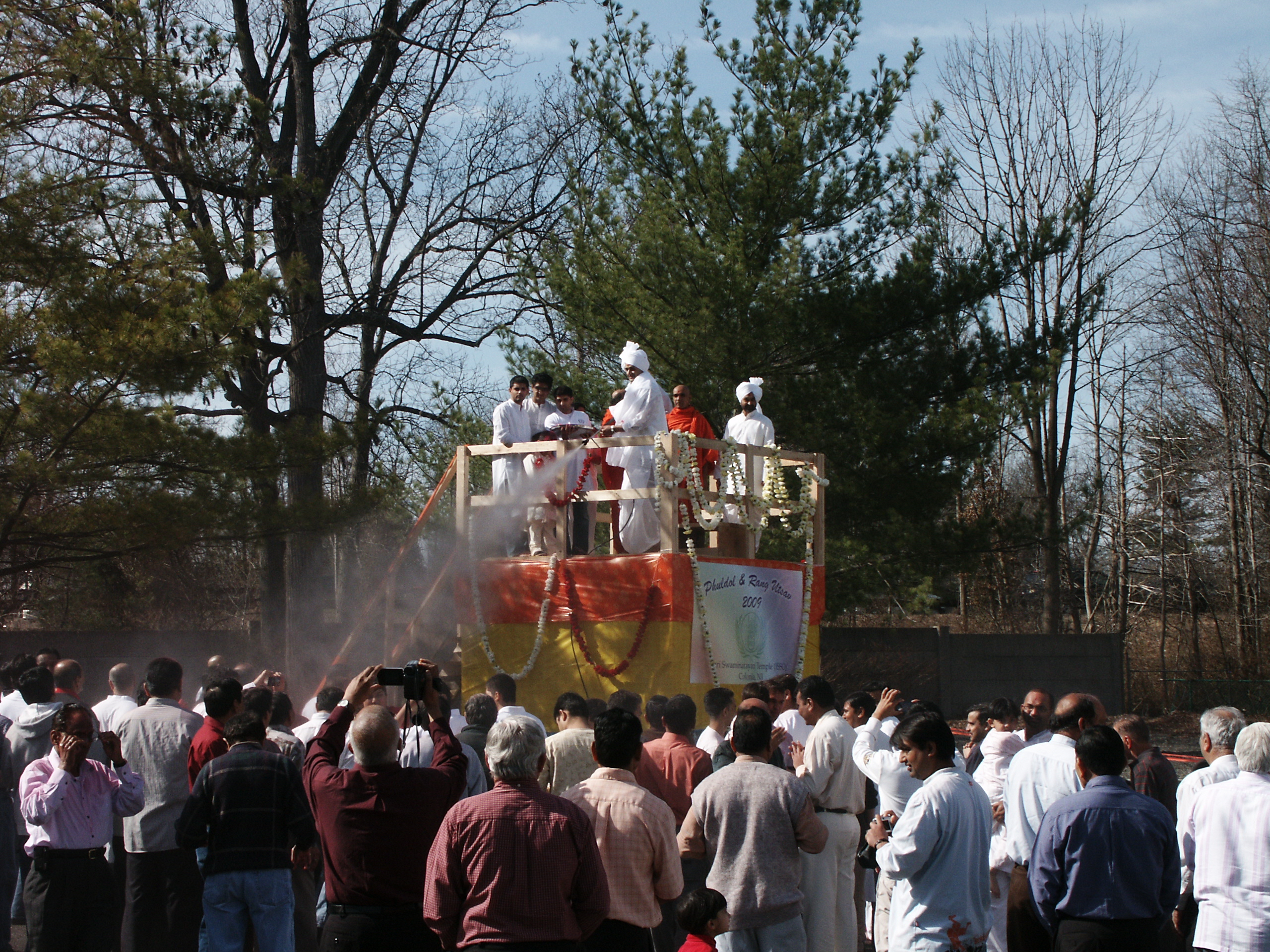
Fuldol festival celebrated on the temple grounds
