= Swaminarayan Mandir, Gadhada =

Hindu temple in Gadhada, India

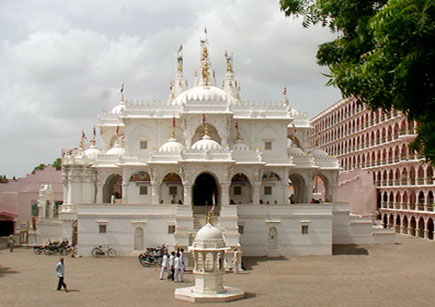
- The temple at Gadhada

- Location in Gujarat

Religion
- Affiliation: Hinduism
- Deity: Radha Krishna
- Festivals: Janmashtami, Radhastami, Holi, Diwali

Location
- Location: Gadhada
- State: Gujarat
- Country: India
- Coordinates: 21.96663°N 71.57483°E

Architecture
- Creator: Swaminarayan
- Completed: 9 October 1828

Website
- www.shrigopinathji.com

Swaminarayan Mandir, Gadhada (Devnagari: श्री स्वामिनारायण मन्दिर, गढडा), also known as Gopinathji Dev mandir, is a Hindu temple in Gadhada, Gujarat, India. This Swaminarayan Sampradaya temple is one of the six temples built by the sect's founder Swaminarayan. The temple is dedicated to Radha Krishna.

== About Gopinathji Mandir ==
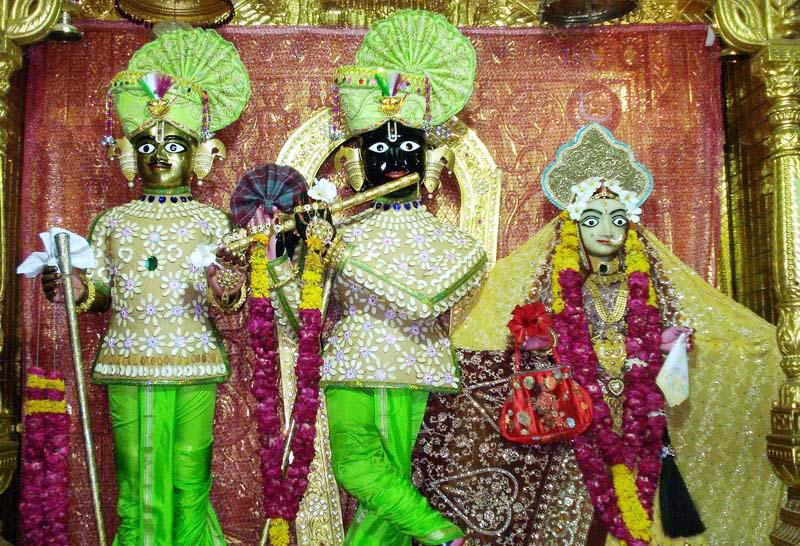
Murtis of Harikrishna, Gopinathji and Radhaji in central shrine

This temple is one of six temples which was made under the supervision of Swaminarayan, the founder of Swaminarayan Sampradaya. The land for constructing this temple in Gadhada, was donated by the court of Dada Khachar in Gadhada. Dada Khachar and his family were devotees of Swaminarayan. The temple was made in the courtyard of his own residence. The temple work was planned and executed directly under the consultation and guidance of Swaminarayan. Swaminarayan supervised the construction and also helped with the manual service in the construction of the temple, by lifting stones and mortar. This shrine has two stories and three domes. It is adorned with carvings. The temple is placed on a high plinth is a spacious square and has an assembly hall with large dharamshalas and kitchens for ascetics and pilgrims.

Swaminarayan had installed the idols in this temple on 9 October 1828. Gopinath (a form of Krishna), his consort Radha and Harikrishna (Swaminarayan) are consecrated in the central shrine. Swaminarayan's parents Dharmadeva and Bhaktimata and Vasudeva (Krishna's father) are worshipped in the western shrine. Revti-Baldevji, Krishna and Suryanarayan in the eastern shrine. The idol of Harikrishna has physique as same as Swaminarayan.

== Lakshmiwadi ==
Lakshmiwadi (place of cremation of Swaminarayan) is situated a little away from the town. At Lakshmiwadi, a single dome temple has been constructed at the place of the funeral rituals of Swaminarayan's mortal remains. A little ahead, there is one canopy where Swaminarayan used to sit and deliver the discourses, and just a little ahead, there is the room of Nishkulanand Swami, where he placed the palanquin prepared by him for Swaminarayan's last journey. A neem tree faces this place, and on its western side, there is one more canopy where Swaminarayan celebrated 'Sharadotsava.'

== Other information ==
Besides the idols installed by Swaminarayan himself, the temple is a place of many memories of saint Swaminarayan. On the path of the worship circuit of the inner temple, there is the idol of Ghanshyam (a form of Swaminarayan) facing northward. This prasadi temple has prasadi items of Swaminarayan displayed in a museum at the temple.

On the southern side of the temple, there is a big neem tree and the chamber of Vasudeva where Swaminarayan gave several discourses which are recorded in the Vachanamrut scripture. The court of Dada Khachar has been preserved in its original form. On the backside, there is the Akshar Ordi temple and Gangajalio well.

Swaminarayan and his saints used to take a bath in the Ghela River. This river flows in the south side of the temple. There are prasadi river-beds – Narayan Dharo and Sahasra Dharo which Swaminarayan visited frequently. There are small temples of Neelkanth Mahadev and Hanuman on the bank of the river. Other holy places are Naliyeri Dhar for Hanuman temple (small mountain), Bhakti Baug and Radhavav which are around 2 km from Gadhada (Swamina).

In May 2012, the temple's spires were plated with gold, making it the first temple in Gujarat to have golden spires. This exercise cost the temple ₹210 million (US$2.2 million).
