= Jetalpur =

- village
- Location in Gujarat, India Jetalpur (India)
- Coordinates: 22°53′0″N 72°36′0″E
- Country: India
- State: Gujarat
- District: Ahmedabad

Languages
  - Official: Gujarati, Hindi
- Time zone: UTC+5:30 (IST)
- Vehicle registration: GJ
- Website: gujaratindia.com

Jetalpur is a town in the Ahmedabad district of the Indian state of Gujarat. It is the location of a Swaminarayan temple commissioned by Swaminarayan himself. Jetalpur Village Located in between Kheda and Ahmedabad

An engineering college named Narnarayan Shastri Institute of Technology is situated in Jetalpur.
