= Gopinath (Krishna) =

Epithet of Hindu god Krishna

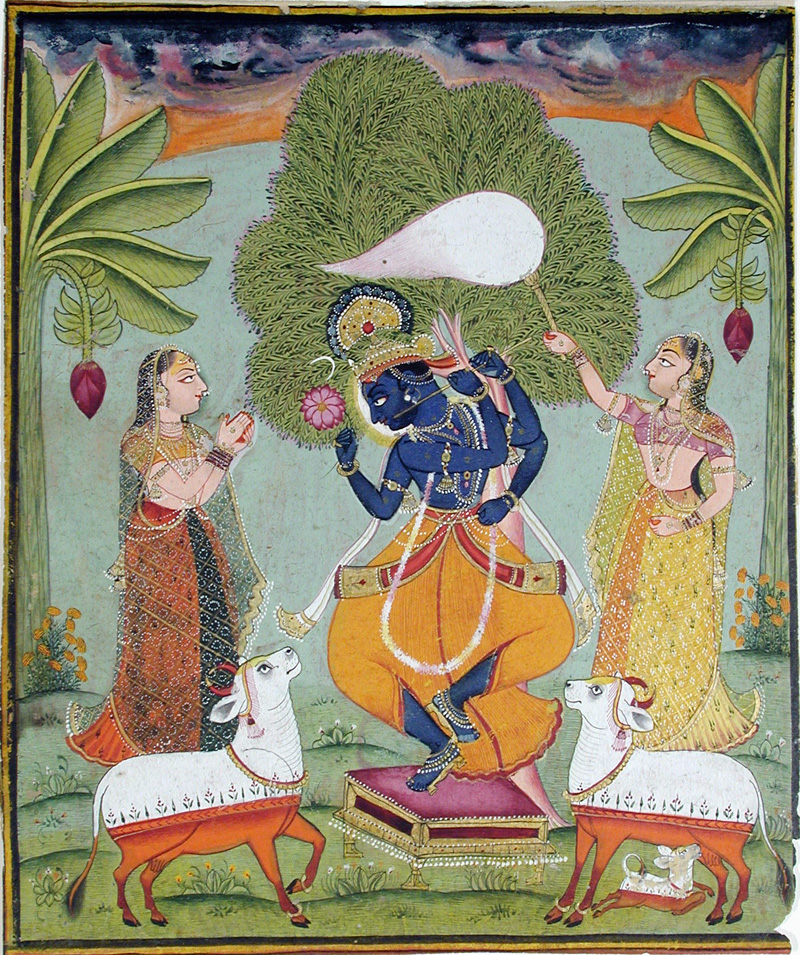
Krishna dances with gopis.

Gopinath (Sanskrit: गोपीनाथ, romanized: Gopīnātha) or Gopinatha is a form of the Hindu god Krishna. It is also one of the primary names of Krishna, meaning, "the lord of the cowherdesses".

Gopinath is associated with the gopis (milkmaids) of the Braj (Vraja) region. The gopis are regarded to symbolise selfless devotion (bhakti) to the deity, flocking around him in love and worship. The relationship between the gopis and Krishna is described in texts such as the Harivamsa, Bhagavata Purana, and the Gita Govinda.

== Meanings ==
The name Gopinath is a Sanskrit compound. Generally, Gopinath is understood to be a tatpuruṣa compound meaning "Lord (or protector) of the gopīs."

A Gaudiya interpretation of the name is that Gopinath is a bahuvrīhi compound meaning "Krishna whose masters are the gopīs."

== Temples ==
In many Krishna temples, Krishna is worshipped as Gopinath. Historic temples of Gopinath includes:

- Sri Sri Radha Gopinath Temple, Jaipur
- Sri Sri Radha Gopinath Temple, Vrindavan
- Gopinath Dev Temple, Gujarat
- Sri Sri Gopinath jiu temple Raghubati, West Bengal
- Sree Sree Gopinath jiu temple, Gopinathpur, Akkelpur, Joypurhat, Bangladesh.

== See also ==
- Achyuta
- Gopala
- Govinda
- Keshava
- Madhava
- Radha Ramana
- Vāsudeva
