= Gadhada =

Gadhada Gadhpur
- Town
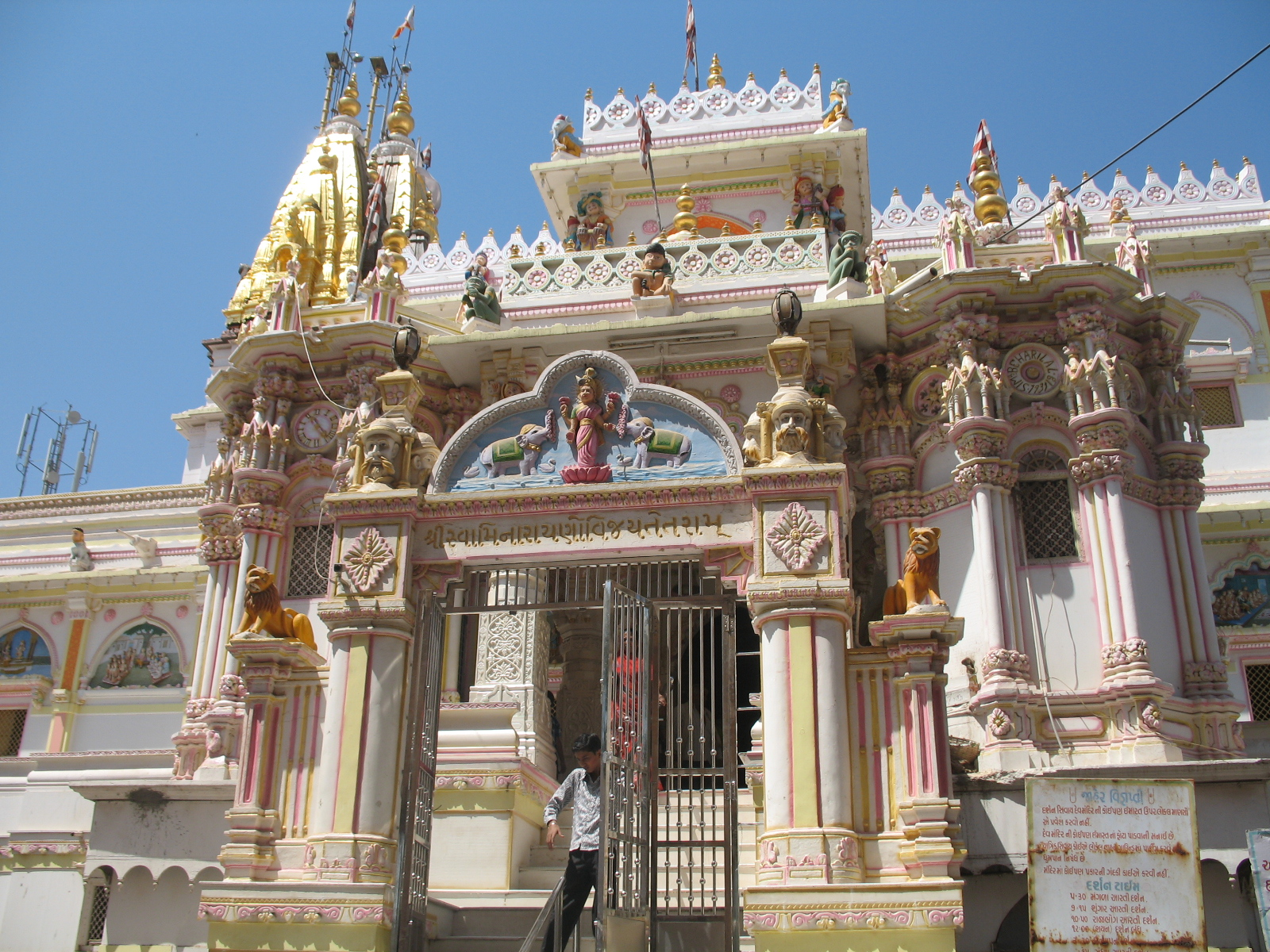
- Swaminarayan Temple in Gadhada

- Location in Gujarat, India Gadhada (India)
- Coordinates: 21.97°N 71.57°E
- Country: India
- State: Gujarat
- District: Botad District

Government
  - Type: Palika Pramukh
  - Body: Nagar Palika
- Elevation: 104 m (341 ft)

Population (2001)
  - Total: 26,751

Languages
  - Official: Gujarati, Hindi
- Time zone: UTC+5:30 (IST)
- Postal code: 364750
- Vehicle registration: GJ
- Website: gujaratindia.com

Gadhada is a town and a municipality in Botad District in the state of Gujarat, India. Gadhada is situated at bank of River Ghela. Swaminarayan lived here for more than 25 years.

== Geography ==
Gadhada is located at 21.97°N 71.57°E. It has an average elevation of 104 metres (341 feet).

== Demographics ==
As of 2001 India census, Gadhada had a population of 26,751. Males constitute 52% of the population and females 48%. Gadhada has an average literacy rate of 62%, higher than the national average of 59.5%: male literacy is 70%, and female literacy is 54%. In Gadhada, 16% of the population were under 6 years of age.

== Transport ==
Gadhada is well connected by roads to other cities of Gujarat. Regular bus service and private vehicles are available from Ahmedabad and other big cities of Gujarat. To reach Gadhada by train, you may get down at Botad or Ningala in Ahmedabad - Bhavnagar track. Connecting bus service to Gadhada is available from both these stations.

== Landmarks ==
The Swaminarayan Temple, also known as Gopinathji temple in Gadhada is regarded as one of the important places of pilgrimage for followers of the Swaminarayan sect, as Swaminarayan spent more than 27 years of his life in Gadhada. Swaminarayan Hindu Temple in Gadhada is one of the one of six temples which was made under the supervision of Swaminarayan himself.
