= Shri Swaminarayan Mandir, London (East London) =

Shri Swaminarayan Mandir
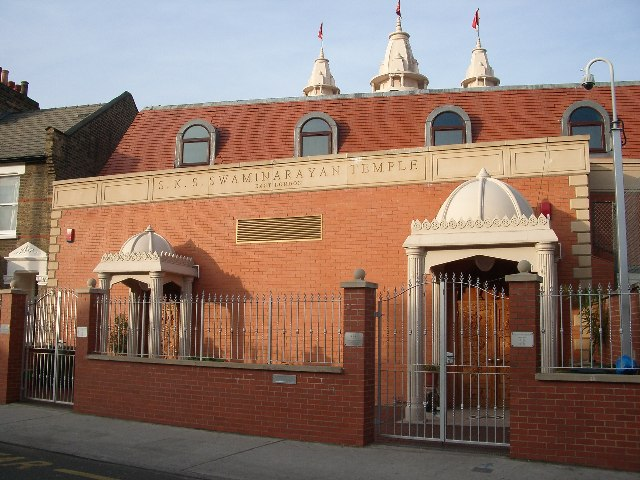

- Location in Greater London

Religion
- Affiliation: Hinduism
- Deity: Swaminarayan

Location
- Location: London Borough of Newham in East London
- Country: England
- Interactive map of Shri Swaminarayan Mandir
- Coordinates: 51°32′23.63″N 0°2′8.53″E

Architecture
- Established: 1987
- Completed: 2002

Website
- www.eltemple.uk

Shree Kutch Satsang Swaminarayan Temple (East London) is a Swaminarayan Temple in east London, in the London Borough of Newham that comes under the Narnarayan Dev Gadi and is part of the Hindu faith.

The main Hindu temple (Mandir), with an upper floor used for seminars and other gatherings, and a library selling books and other religious material. A kitchen and dining area a few doors down, which was previously used as a temporary Mandir while the main Mandir was being reconstructed. The organization is a charity registered and was formed in 1986.

== Institutions and groups under the Temple ==
- A Gujarati school - Sahajanand School
- A youth group - Swaminarayan Yuvak Mandal
- A Band/Lazium team - Band/Lazium
- A Bhajan team - Performs Bhajans

== Yuvak Mandal ==
This is the Youth Wing. According to Swaminarayan Sampraday scriptures each and every occasion is celebrated with great festivity. These include occasions such as, Rama Navami, Janmashtami, Diwali, Ankoth, and so on, with special inclusions of annual anniversary celebrations of the Temple followed by 5 to 7 days Katha Parayan in the presence of saints and the Acharya.

Boys & Girls Sabhas, Dhol Lessons, Summer fun-days out, Treasure hunts, Christmas fun-days, Shikshapatri evening lectures, are some of the activities of the Yuvak Mandal of East London Swaminarayan Temple.
