= Shri Swaminarayan Mandir, London (Harrow) =

Shri Swaminarayan Mandir
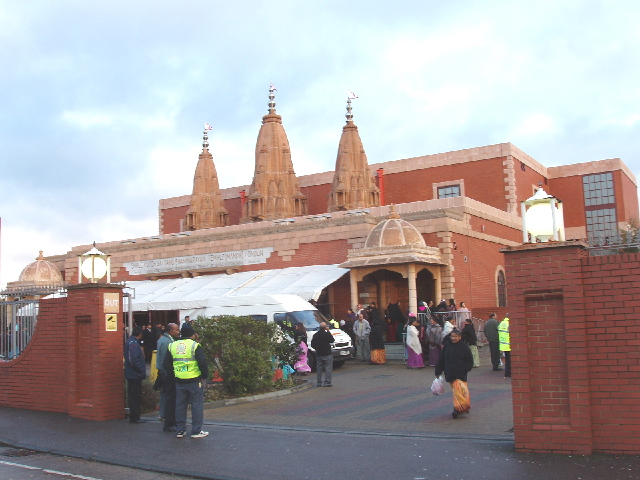

- Location in Greater London

Religion
- Affiliation: Hinduism
- Deity: Swaminarayan in the form of Ghanshyam

Location
- Location: London Borough of Harrow in North London
- Country: England
- Coordinates: 51°35′16″N 0°18′6″W

Architecture
- Established: 1976
- Completed: 30 December 1996

Website
- sksst.org

Shri Kutch Satsang Swaminarayan Temple (Harrow) is a Swaminarayan Temple in the London Borough of Harrow. When opened in 1976, the temple was originally located at Vaughan Road, West Harrow. It was moved to the Kenton area of Harrow in 1996 to accommodate the growing congregation. The temple comes under the NarNarayan Dev Gadi of the Swaminarayan Sampraday.

== Temple activities ==
- A nursery for young children - Ghanshyam Nursery
- Gujarati language classes
- Hinduism classes
- A day care centre for the elderly. The work which includes a reading area, meditation areas, library, dining room, kitchen and an office was started in 2004 and was completed in time for the 10th anniversary.

== 10th Anniversary ==
About 6,000 people turned up to celebrate the 10th anniversary in 2006–07. Bronze idols, usually displayed inside the temple, were paraded on floats, while dancers and musicians performed in the streets. Marquees helped take the edge of the cold as people danced and sang. Police set up road diversions along Roe Green Park, Kingsbury High Road and Kenton Lane to cope with the large crowds and the two-hour event passed without any trouble. The event was attended by Harrow East MP and Minister of State for Employment and Welfare Reform, Tony McNulty and a number of local councillors. Road closures were in operation at Kenton Lane and Kingsbury High Road up to Roe Green for the event.

== Charity walks ==
The temple has regularly organised charity walks to raise money for various causes. In 2005, the temple organised a Charity walk in aid of victims of the South Asian tsunami victims. Harrow West MP Gareth Thomas, Mayor of Harrow, Councillor Lurline Champagnie and the Leader of Harrow Council, Councillor Navin Shah took part in the event. In 2008, the temple youth wing organised a charity walk in aid of Welldon Activity Group (one of the Mayor of Harrow's chosen charities) and Kenton-based St Luke's Hospice. The route chosen was from the Harrow Civic Centre to the temple. The walk raised nearly £50,000 for the two causes.
