= Shri Swaminarayan Mandir, London (Willesden) =

Shree Swaminarayan Mandir, London (Willesden)
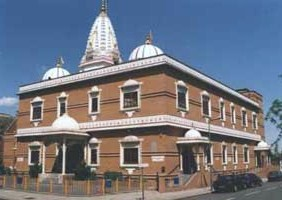
- The first Swaminarayan temple in London

- Location in Greater London

Religion
- Affiliation: Hinduism
- Deity: Swaminarayan in the form of Ghanshyam

Location
- Location: London
- Country: England
- Coordinates: 51°32′45.4″N 0°12′55″W

Architecture
- Completed: October 11, 1975

Shree Swaminarayan Temple Willesden is a Swaminarayan Mandir under the Nara-Narayan diocese in the London suburb of Willesden.

== History ==
In 1975, a disused church on Willesden Lane was bought and renovated. On the auspicious day of Sharad Purnima on 11 October 1975, Acharya Tejendraprasad Pande installed the murtis of Swaminarayan, Nara-Narayan Dev, Radha Krishna Dev, Hanuman and Ganesh.

=== Renovation ===
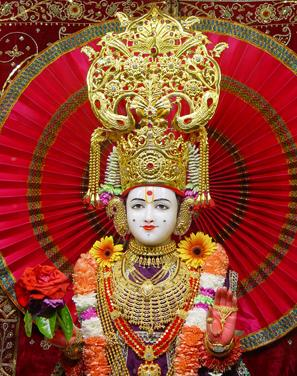
The image of Ghanshyam

The church building could not accommodate the increasing numbers of satsangis over time. New activities had also been introduced such as Gujarati language classes, a library, and a picture framing service as well as other youth activities.

An adjoining building was bought thinking that it would solve the problem, but even so this could not meet the needs.

In 1986 a proposal was put forward to demolish the two existing buildings and in its place build a three temple story complex, which would combine the traditional Hindu Temple architecture and British designs. The ceremonial stone was laid on 12 October 1986. On 29 July 1988, Acharya Tejendraprasad Pande opened the new building.

== Activities ==
The following activities are conducted by the temple.

- Gujarati School: A Gujarati language school runs in the temple premises. The school boasts 500 students and 60 volunteer teachers.
- SSTW Academy: There are various sports activities, camps, religious activities and discussions run by this academy that was formed in 1997.
- Yoga classes
- Tabla classes
- Hinduism classes
- Bal Kendra classes, for young children
- Vachanamrut classes that teach the Vachanamrut, an important scripture in the Swaminarayan Sampraday
- Festival Alerts: The temple provides email and SMS alerts for upcoming festivals

Apart from the above, the temple has also been active in providing assistance during natural disasters. For example, the temple organised a charity walk to help provide aid for the 2004 tsunami that struck South Asia. A few years before that, in 2001 the temple took up the responsibility for coordinating relief work for the Gujarat earthquake from London. The temple sent 60 tons of clothing and blankets to affected areas.
