= International Swaminarayan Satsang Organisation =

Hindu organisation

International Swaminarayan Satsang Organization
- ISSO Logo
- Abbreviation: ISSO
- Formation: Year 1978
- Type: NGO
- Purpose: Religious
- Headquarters: Shri Swaminarayan Mandir, Ahmedabad
- Location: World Wide
- Members: Members of the Swaminarayan Sampraday
- Leader: Acharya Shree Koshalendraprasadji Maharaj
- Parent organization: Narnarayan Dev Gadi (Ahmedabad)
- Website: www.swaminarayan.info

Tejendraprasad (who was then Acharya of the Swaminarayan Sampraday (Ahmedabad Gadi)) founded International Swaminarayan Satsang Organization (I.S.S.O.) (Devanagari: अंतरराष्ट्रीय स्वामींनारायण सत्संग संस्थान) in the United States on the occasion of Vijaya Dashami in the year 1978.

The prime objective of I.S.S.O. is "To advance the Sanatana Dharma, in accordance with the principles and teachings of the Swaminarayan Sampraday, founded and ordained by Sahajanand Swami", enabling Lord Swaminarayan's devotees from both the NarNarayan Dev Gadi (Ahmedabad) & LaxmiNarayan Dev Gadi (Vadtal) to practice their religious duties in harmony.

This achieved, the efforts of all the followers of the Swaminarayan Sampraday can be polarised, allowing for joint activities to be undertaken. In turn, this will enable the followers to meet the challenges they are faced with today in giving their youth a religious experience that they can understand and practice themselves.

== Activities ==
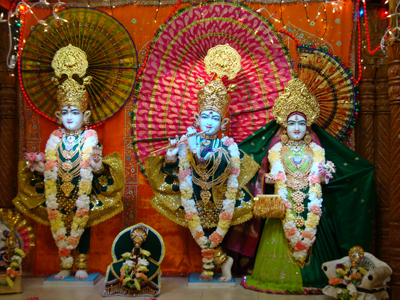
Swaminarayan in the form of Ghanshyam with Radha Krishna at the Swaminarayan temple in Los Angeles under ISSO

=== Gurukul ===
Classes are held in English every Friday evening in London, where the religious principles of the Swaminarayan Sampraday are taught. Exploring the greatness of the scriptures and discussing and debating on the modern day issues affecting young satsangis stimulates the desire to learn more.

=== Summer Camps ===
Summer camps concentrating on religious teachings in a religious atmosphere in the presence of Acharya Shree Koshalendraprasadji Maharaj & saints. These camps take place annually in the UK and United States, where hundreds of youth have been inspired into a religious life.

=== Publications ===
Audio cassettes (Kirtan and Katha), video cassettes (Utsavs and documentaries) and scriptural books (Vachanamrit, Shikshapatri, Satsangi Jeevan, Puranas, etc.)

== ISSO Seva ==
In 2001 ISSO Seva was established. It is an independent running charity under the Swaminarayan Sampraday to give a helping hand to mankind, to help the homeless and needy as well as making awareness about the modern day diseases and infections. It provides relief for when a natural disaster strikes worldwide. The charity is run by professionals and volunteers of the Swaminarayan temples and centres.

Humanitarian relief has been accorded a privileged place in the Sampraday's social philosophy. All temples have been instrumental in raising awareness of the plight of people in numerous disasters; 1993 Latur earthquake, 1999 Odisha cyclone, and 2001 Gujarat earthquake, etc. in recent times via the Swaminarayan Temples in India.

== See also ==
- NarNarayan Dev Yuvak Mandal
