= Nar Narayan Dev Gadi =

Sect of Hinduism

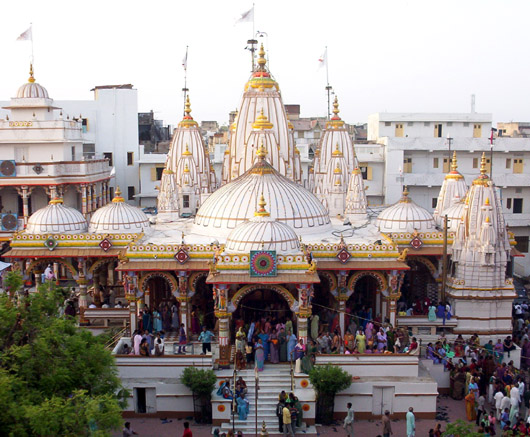
- The headquarters of the NarNarayan Dev Gadi
- Type: Swaminarayan Sampradaya
- Classification: Hinduism
- Scripture: Shikshapatri; Vachanamrut; Satsangi Jivan; Desh Vibhag Lekh
- Acharya: Koshalendraprasad.
- Region: Gujarat, India
- Language: Sanskrit; Gujarati
- Headquarters: Swaminarayan Temple, Ahmedabad
- Territory: Uttar vibhag (North division)
- Founder: Swaminarayan, Ayodhyaprasad
- Origin: 1826; Vadtal
- Other name(s): Ahmedabad Gadi
- Logo

The Nar Narayan Dev Gadi (Naranarāyan Dēv Gadī), named after the two forms of supreme lord Nara-Narayana, is one of the two Gadis (seats) that together form the Swaminarayan Sampradaya. Its headquarter is at the Swaminarayan Temple, Ahmedabad and controls the Uttar Vibhag (North division).

The current acharya (spiritual leader) of the Gadi is Koshalendraprasad.

== Organisational structure ==
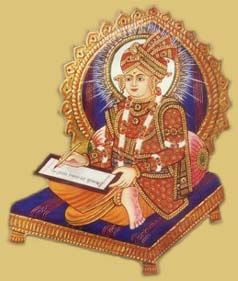
Illustration of Swaminarayan writing the Shiskhapatri

In 1826 at Vadtal, Swaminarayan established the dual Acharyaship in Dharmavanshi Acharyas, whom he intended as his successor. "Dharmavanshi" means "belonging to the lineage of Dharmadev" – the father of Swaminarayan. Swaminarayan enthroned his two adopted sons, Ayodhyaprasad Pande and Raghuvir Pande, who were the sons of his brothers Rampratap and Ichcharam, as the spiritual leaders of the Nar Narayan Dev Gadi headquartered at Ahmedabad and the Laxmi Narayan Dev Gadi headquartered at Vadtal respectively. He installed them as the Acharyas for all followers, including householders and ascetics. Swaminarayan gave sole authority to these two individuals to install murtis in temples and to initiate sadhus and householders into the Sampraday. He did this using a legal document known as "Desh Vibhag no Lekh", which he dictated and was written by Shukanand Swami. Learned saints and elder satsangis witnessed this document. Copies were presented to the inaugural Acharyas, Ayodhyaprasad Pande and Raghuvir Pande – these are currently in the possession of the current Acharyas. The document was accepted by the Bombay High Court as the authoritative document regarding the apportionment of the two dioceses, so it has legal standing. Presently, Acharya Maharajshri Rakeshprasad Maharaj is at the head of Laxmi Narayan Dev Gadi, while Acharya Maharajshri Koshalendraprasad Maharaj is at the head of the Nar Narayan Dev Gadi at Ahmedabad.

=== Importance of Acharyas ===
Swaminarayan thought that as he had established the temples and the Swaminarayan Sampraday, he wanted to keep his sadhus free from the affairs dealing with wealth, power and other worldly affairs. He decided to create leaders who would subsequently be responsible for the Swaminarayan Sampraday. This led to his decision to appoint his nephews as Acharyas. The constitution of the Sampraday is laid out in Desh Vibhag Lekh which describes in detail the functions of the Acharyas.

... it is my command to all sadhus, bhamcharis and all satsangies, that for the purpose of your kalyaan (emancipation) you must obey and follow the two Acharyas of Dharmavansh, and obey their commands by thought, action and speech. If this is compromised and whoever turns elsewhere (rejecting the Acharyas) will find that they will never find sukh (happiness) in this world or the worlds beyond and will experience immense distress ... ― Desh Vibhag Lekh

The Acharyas of the Sampraday are administrative heads, spiritual leaders and the gurus of their followers. Since the acharyas are supposed to refrain from contact with the opposite sex, except close relations, the acharyas' wives are the gurus for female members of the sect, and must avoid contact with unfamiliar men. The acharyas wear a red turban, and carry a golden staff and umbrella, the symbols of their authority In the scripture Purushottam Prakash (Nishkulanand Kavya), the writer Nishkulanand Swami describes Swaminarayan's establishment of the Dharmavanshi Acharyas.

The Acharyas are responsible for:

- Initiating followers into the organisation with a Samanya Diksha by giving the guru-mantra
- Initiating monks-sadhus by giving them the Maha-Bhagwadi Diksha
- Perform murti-pratishtha, installing deities in the temples
- Authenticating scriptures of the Sampraday
- Acting as the Guru and leader of the entire Sampraday

These responsibilities are prescribed in the holy texts Shikshapatri, Satsangi Jeevan and Desh Vibhag Lekh, according to which no person other than the Dharmavanshi Acharyas may carry out these duties.

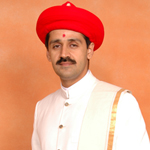
Koshalendraprasad Pande

In one of the most authoritative scriptures, the Vachanamrut, Swaminarayan states one of the prerequisites for attaining Akshardham. He wrote, "The devotee who is aashrit of Dharmakul (i.e. he who has received initiation from Dharmavanshi Acharya and remains loyal to the Acharya) gets a divine Bhram-state body by God's wish." It is seen as imperative to be a humble, loyal follower of the Dharmavanshi Acharya once receiving the diksha (guru mantra) in order to achieve a bhram form. In Swamini Vato, Swaminarayan was quoted, "Even Gunatitanand Swami, one of the main sadhus of Swaminarayan states, 'He who insults the temples, Acharyas, sadhus and satsangis will find his roots being destroyed and will inevitably fall from the satsang.' "

=== Membership ===
Male satsangis are initiated by the acharya of the gadi he comes under. Female satsangis are initiated by the wife of the acharya, who is the leader of women in the Swaminarayan Sampraday. In the absence of the acharya, ascetics perform this initiation, which is then confirmed by the acharya on his next visit. The ceremony involves the taking of five vows (panch vartaman): not to commit adultery or robbery, not to consume intoxicants or meat and not to lie. The initiator then pours water over the initiates hands, gives him a Sanskrit shloka, Shri Krishna twam gatirmama, meaning Shri Krishna thou art my refuge. The initiate then offers at least half a rupee to the acharya, who adorns a kanthi thread around the initiate's neck. The initiate is then required to apply the tilak chandlo to his forehead (chandan U and red kum kum dot in the middle). Ladies only apply the red kum kum dot.

There are eight important things in the life of a Satsangi; these are Kanthi – a thread worn around the neck, the Tilak Chandlo – a holy mark, the Mala – a thread with 108 beads, Nitya Pooja – daily prayers, the Temple, Darshan – a form of worship, Aarti – a ceremony, and Vandu Pad and Chesta Pad – verses recited in the temples daily. A Satsangi must show reverence for God, the Shastras, the Acharya of the Gadi the Satsangi comes under (NarNarayan Dev Gadi or LaxmiNarayan Dev Gadi), festivals, elders and be of overall good conduct.

Upon initiation, Satsangi make 11 vows, called Niyams (Rules):

- Be non-violent
- Do not have any kind of relationship with a woman other than your wife
- Do not eat meat, including seafood, poultry products or eggs
- Do not drink products that contain alcohol, including medicines
- Never touch a widow woman whom you do not know
- Never commit suicide in any circumstances
- Do not steal
- Never blame others for something that you may not know about
- Never disparage God, Goddesses, or any religion
- Never eat someone's food who does not follow these eleven rules
- Never listen to holy stories from an atheist.

=== Ascetics ===
From the beginning, ascetics have played a major role in the Swaminarayan Sampraday. They contribute towards growth and development of the movement and towards the salvation of its members. Sadhus, initiated by either Dharmavanshi Acharya, also form an integral part of the organisation and wear only orange robes. The Brahmachari ascetics, who are Brahmins, have a special responsibility of taking care of images in temples. These ascetics wear white robes on their waist and an orange cloth over their shoulder. Ascetics lead a strict life, refraining from worldly pleasures and devoting their lives to the service of the holy fellowship. They preach the philosophy and lifetimes of Swaminarayan and encourage people to follow a pious and religious life. Swaminarayan has stated in the Vachanamrut that the association of Satpurush (true saints/devotees) opens the path to salvation. In 1999, the Ahmedabad Gadi had 765 male ascetics and the Vadtal Gadi 1468 male ascetics.

The first rule of becoming an ascetic (sanyasi) of the sect is never to come in contact with the opposite sex, or money. Ascetics are not allowed to leave the temple alone; they have to move out in pairs. Even in the temple, while using the toilet, they must do so in pairs to ensure they keep their vows. The food they eat must be mixed up so that they may not taste it.

Female ascetics, known as Samkhya yoginis, receive initiation from the Gadiwala, or wife of the Acharya. They stay within the temple, follow ascetic rules strictly, wear dark red clothing and stay in the temple Haveli. They take care of the images in women's temples and conduct discourses for women. In 1999, the Ahmedabad Gadi had 440 female ascetics and the Vadtal Gadi had 115 female ascetics.

== Acharyas ==
The following table lists all the Acharyas of the Ahmedabad Gadi till date.

Acharya Number	Name of Acharya	Born on	Became Acharya on	Death	Term
1	Ayodyaprasad	25 May 1809	10 November 1826	18 February 1868	42 Years
2	Keshavprasad	16 April 1835	18 February 1868	9 April 1890	22 Years
3	Purshottamprasad	7 February 1870	9 April 1890	25 November 1901	12 Years
4	Vasudevprasad	17 July 1899	25 November 1901	29 November 1937	35 Years
5	Devendraprasad	5 October 1922	30 November 1937	12 October 1969	32 Years
6	Tejendraprasad	11 April 1944	13 October 1969	Present	35 Years
7	Koshalendraprasad	18 October 1972	15 October 2004	Present	Present

== Subordinate Organisations ==
=== ISSO ===
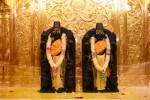
NarNarayan at the Swaminarayan Temple in New Jersey (Colonia)

In 1978, the then Acharya of the Ahmedabad gadi, Tejendraprasad, founded the International Swaminarayan Satsang Organisation (ISSO) in the United States on the occasion of Vijaya Dasami. The prime objective of I.S.S.O. is "To advance the Sanatan Dharma, in accordance with the principles and teachings of the Swaminarayan Sampraday, founded and ordained by Sahajanand Swami", enabling Swaminarayan's devotees from both the Nar Narayan Dev Gadi (Ahmedabad) & Laxmi Narayan Dev Gadi (Vadtal) to practice their religious duties in harmony.

This achieved, the efforts of all the followers of the Sampraday can be polarised, allowing for joint activities to be undertaken. In turn, this will enabling followers to meet the challenges that they are faced with today in giving their youth a religious experience that they can understand and practice themselves.

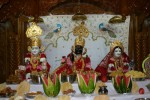
Hari Krishna (left) and RadhaKrishna at the Swaminarayan Temple in Florida

=== ISSO Seva ===
In 2001, ISSO Seva, an independently run charity under the Swaminarayan Sampraday was established to help mankind, the homeless and needy and promote awareness about modern day diseases and infections. It provides relief after natural disasters worldwide. The charity is run by professionals and volunteers of the Swaminarayan temples and centres.

=== NNDYM ===
Narnarayan Dev Yuvak Mandal (NNDYM) is a youth organisation which was founded by Koshalendraprasad before becoming the acharya in 1994. Its headquarters are at the Swaminarayan Mandir in Ahmedabad; it was created to help young people to confront the challenges of human life. This organisation has various initiatives to build a foundation of young people across the globe. It propagates duty, devotion, knowledge (gnaan) and detachment from illusion (maya).

== Recent Developments ==
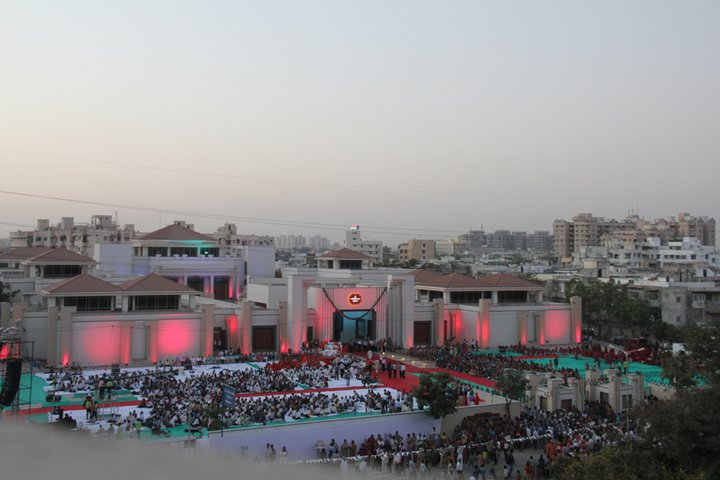
Swaminarayan Museum inauguration

=== Swaminarayan Museum ===
Swaminarayan Museum in Ahmedabad, which houses more than 5000 artifacts, was opened in March 2011. The museum holds items such as Swaminarayan's writing scripts, day to day garments and ornaments. This is the first project in the Swaminarayan Sampraday that aims to acquire all of Swaminarayan's Prasadi items from temples across the world. This museum is a dream of the retired acharya of Ahmedabad, Tejendraprasad.

== See also ==
- Swaminarayan
- Swaminarayan Sampraday
