= Shri Swaminarayan Mandir, Chicago (Wheeling) =

Hindu temple

Coordinates: 42°08′47.5″N 87°55′33.6″W

Shri Swaminarayan Temple
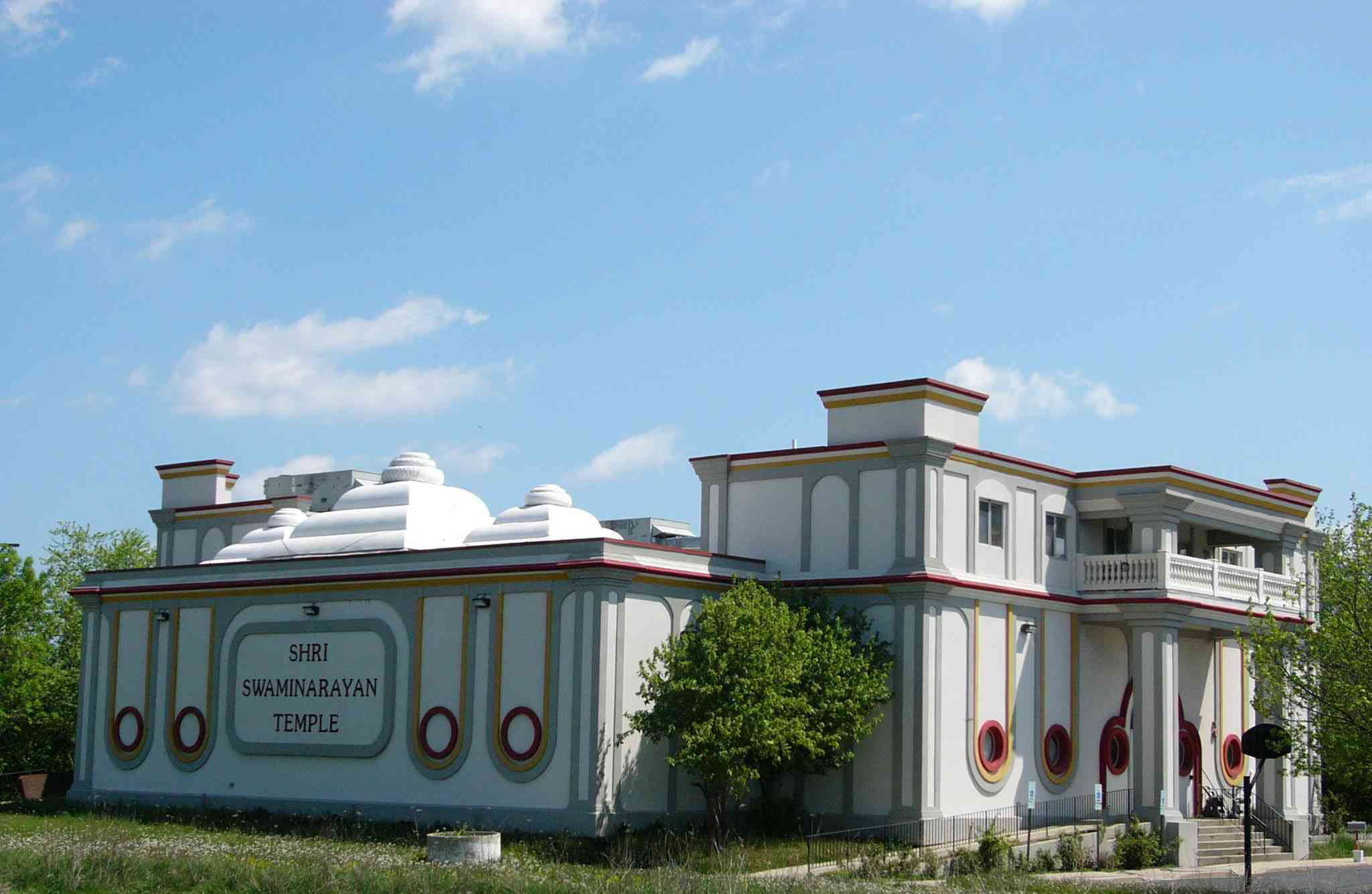
- Shri Swaminarayan Temple

Religion
- Affiliation: Hinduism
- Deity: Swaminarayan in pictorial form
- Festivals: Swaminarayan Jayanti, Diwali

Location
- Location: Wheeling
- State: Illinois
- Country: United States
- Interactive map of Shri Swaminarayan Temple

Architecture
- Completed: May 26, 1991

Website
- http://www.shriswaminarayan.com/

Shri Swaminarayan Temple, Wheeling is a Swaminarayan Hindu temple located in the Chicago suburb of Wheeling. It comes under the International Swaminarayan Satsang Mandal (Laxmi Narayan Dev Gadi) of the Swaminarayan Sampraday. The temple is also a member of the International Swaminarayan Satsang Organisation.

Opened on 26 May 1991 by Acharya Shree Ajendraprasadji Maharaj, it is built on two acres of land.

Built at a cost of $1.7 million, it is a tri-spire temple with the spires adorning the front edge of the flat topped building. Surrounded by industrial structures, it is a square-shaped, cream coloured structure with a big prayer hall that caters to a 40,000 strong community and is run entirely by volunteers. The image of Swaminarayan is worshipped in pictorial form along with other avatars of Narayana.

== See also ==
- Swaminarayan
