= Tejendraprasad =

Hindu guru

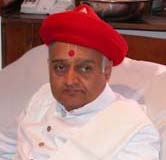
- Tejendraprasad during his days in office

Personal life
- Born: 11 April 1944 (age 82) Ahmedabad, Bombay Presidency, British India
- Honors: 6th Acharya, Narnarayan Dev Gadi

Religious life
- Religion: Hinduism
- Philosophy: Swaminarayan Sampraday (Sanatana Dharma)

Tejendraprasad Pande (born 11 April 1944) was appointed acharya of the Narnarayan Dev gadi (Ahmedabad) of the Swaminarayan Sampraday, a Hindu sect, by his father, the previous acharya, Devendraprasad, and was enthroned on 13 October 1969.

== Biography ==
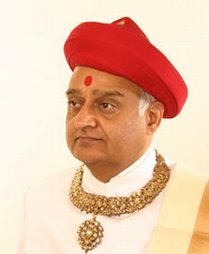
Acharya Shree Tejendraprasadji Maharaj

He took up the responsibilities of the Swaminarayan Sampraday on the orders of Acharya Devendraprasadji from the age of 14 years. Accompanied by learned people, he travelled to East Africa to nurture the Satsang there. He studied English and other subjects at St. Xavier's High School and St Xavier's College in Ahmedabad. In over 30 years of service to the Sampraday, his accomplishments are very numerous. The following is but a summary of the facts detailed in 'Dharma Setu', his biography produced in 1994 during the Silver Jubilee & Golden Jubilee Festival.

He still remains a popular public figure even after retirement. In November 2008, he was invited to release a portfolio of paintings of Shrinathji by the Archer foundation.

== Schools founded ==
- Shree Sahajanand Arts & Commerce College
- Shree Swaminarayan Vidyaalay (Boarding), Bhuj
- Shree Sahajanand Elementary School
- Shree Sahajanand Primary School
- Shree Sahajanand High School
- Shree Sahajanand Multi-Course Academy
- Shree Sahajanand Vaanijay Mahavidyaalay (Commerce College)
- Gurukuls in: Asaarva, Abu, Jhilvana, Gandhidham, Kalol, Jetalpur, Kanbha, Koteshwar, Mandvi, Chiloda, Idar, Rampur, Saayla, Siddhpur Maninagar.
- PUNA Gurukul, Zundal, Ahmedabad

== NarNarayan Dev Yuvak Mandal (NNDYM) ==
He established branches of the NNDYM all over the Northern Zone, along with the then Acharya-Designate Koshalendraprasad Pande. The organization's membership exceeds tens of thousands of youth, from all backgrounds - students, professionals, businesspersons and others. Its activities include tree planting, blood donation camps, religious camps, conferences, seminars, workshops, and many other socially useful activities.

== International Swaminarayan Satsang Organisation ==
He established the International Swaminarayan Satsang Organisation (ISSO) on Vijayadashami, 1978 in the United States. It is particularly active there and in the United Kingdom, with regular camps and conferences for young people.

== Swaminarayan's bicentennial celebrations ==
1981 saw commemorations of the sect's founder's bi-centennial birthday. The largest of these were at Ahmedabad, Bhuj and Muli. Brahmaleen Shree Dongreji Maharaj recited the Bhagwat Katha at the Ahmedabad festival where hundreds of thousands of devotees gathered. A few days later, he travelled to Kutch and presided over the festival in Bhuj. This was followed by another event at Muli.

== Retirement ==
When Tejendraprasad retired in 2004, his son Koshalendraprasadji was enthroned as the acharya. Tejendraprasad remained active as a leader of the Swaminarayan Sampraday.

== See also ==
- Swaminarayan Sampraday
- NarNarayan Dev Gadi
- Acharya Maharajshree Koshalendraprasad Pande
