= Desh Vibhag Lekh =

1827 Indian document by Swaminarayan

The Desh Vibhag Lekh is a document written by Swaminarayan in 1827 establishing the division of the Swaminarayan Sampradaya into two dioceses by territory of Ahmedabad and Vadtal. This document is highly regarded by the two diocese as it establishes Acharyas as the successors to Swaminarayan. Groups that prioritize sadhus over acharyas view the Lekh primarily as an administrative document and place less emphasis on its importance.

It was dictated by Swaminarayan and written by Shukmuni in the courtyard of Khachar Dada at Gadhada in the year 1826. It was translated into English by Geo. P Taylor in 1903. It has been accepted as such by the Bombay High Court as valid document.

== Purpose ==
The Lekh has 30 articles, which give the following directions:

- Demarcation of the jurisdiction and responsibilities of the two Gadis (NarNarayan Dev Gadi and LaxmiNarayan Dev Gadi). The Narnarayan Dev gadi controls the Uttar Desh and Laxminarayan Dev gadi the Dakshin Desh. The demarcation is that the Uttar Desh territory runs from Bhuj to Calcutta and above and the Dakshin Desh territory runs below this line as per this Lekh.
- Duties and responsibilities of Acharyas and means of appointing future Acharyas.
- Directions of what to do with the incomes of the temples
- Appointment of Sadhus and how they should remain under the commands of the Acharyas faithfully.
- Instruction for Satsangi's
- The Lekh outlines that only the acting Acharya can appoint the next Acharya for the Gadi.
- The Acharya can give guru-mantra or diksha and initiate new satsangi's or priests/santos.

== Use ==
This document has been produced in the Indian courts of justice, where the position of the acharaya as the spiritual and administrative heads of their respective diocese of the Swaminarayan Sampradaya and its assets has been repeatedly affirmed. The Indian courts have appointed the acharyas as trustees and successors of their respective dioceses.

The BAPS sect, founded in 1905 after separating from the Vadtal diocese, does not accept this document in literal interpretation yet does not rejects its validity. The BAPS founders too at one point served the original diocese according to Lekh. BAPS does acknowledge that Swaminarayan "for administrative purpose, He divided His mandirs into two regions and appointed his two adopted sons, the Acharyas, Raghuvirji Maharaj and Ayodhyaprasadji Maharaj to guide the progress." But BAPS maintains that Gunatitanand Swami was the sole successor.
