= Nilkanth Dham =

Spiritual and Cultural Hindu temple in Gujarat, India

Nilkanthdham Poicha
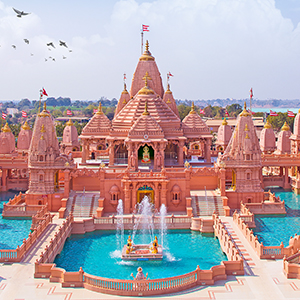
- Nilkanthdham Poicha; Shree Swaminarayan Mandir in Gujarat, India

- Located in Poicha, Narmada, Gujarat

Religion
- Affiliation: Hinduism
- District: Narmada
- Deity: Swaminarayan, Radha-Krishna, Lakshmi-Narayana, All 24 Avatars
- Festival: Kalyan Mahotsav (From Bhai Beej till Labh Pancham)
- Governing body: Shree Swaminarayan Gurukul Rajkot Sansthan
- Status: Active
- Features: Tower: 31 Shikhara; Temple tank: 1 lake (The Narayan Sarovar is a man-made lake that surrounds the main monument)

Location
- Location: Poicha
- State: Gujarat
- Country: India
- Interactive map of Nilkanthdham Poicha
- Coordinates: 21°58′16.63″N 73°28′20.01″E"Driving direction to Nilkanthdham Poicha" (Map). Google Maps.

Architecture
- Architect: Swaminarayan Gurukul Rajkot Sansthan
- Creator: Dharmavallabhdasji Swami inspired by Guruvarya Shri Devkrushnadasji Swami Rajkot Gurukul and Rakeshprasadji Maharaj acharya of the Laxmi Narayan Dev Gadi
- Established: 28 October 2013 (officially started)
- Site area: 105 acres

Website
- https://www.nilkanthdham.org/

The Nilkanth Dham is Swaminarayan Mandir a Hindu temple, and spiritual-cultural campus located in Poicha, near the banks of the Narmada River, in Gujarat, India. This temple is also referred to as Nilkanthdham Poicha or Poicha Swaminarayan Mandir. Nilkanthdham temple is approximately 80 kilometers from Bharuch and 60 kilometers from Vadodara by road. The nearest railway station is Vadodara, located around 61.9 kilometers away, and the nearest airport is also in Vadodara, about 65.8 kilometers from the temple.

== History ==
Nilkanthdham is a Hindu temple featuring traditional Indian architecture and sculpture, constructed by Swaminarayan Gurukul Rajkot Sansthan under the guidance of Shree Dharmavallabhdasji Swami, and inspired by Guruvarya Shree Devkrushndasji Swami and Shastri Maharaj Shree Dharmajivandasji Swami. The temple was officially opened on October 28, 2013, by Guruvarya Shree Devkrushndasji Swami. The murti pran pratishtha ceremony was performed by Shree Rakeshprasadji Maharaj, acharya of the Laxmi Narayan Dev Gadi, in the presence of saints and followers of the Hindu Swaminarayan Sampraday.

== Features ==
Nilkanthdham spans 108 acres and includes the Swaminarayan Mandir, Sahajanand Universe (a Hindu culture exhibition), Gau Dham (a cowshed), and the Narmada riverbank. It is located near the Statue of Unity, the world's tallest statue. The proximity of the Statue of Unity, only a few kilometers from the temple complex, allows travelers to visit both attractions conveniently in a single trip.
