= Swaminarayan Museum =

Museum in Gujarat, India

Shree Swaminarayan Museum
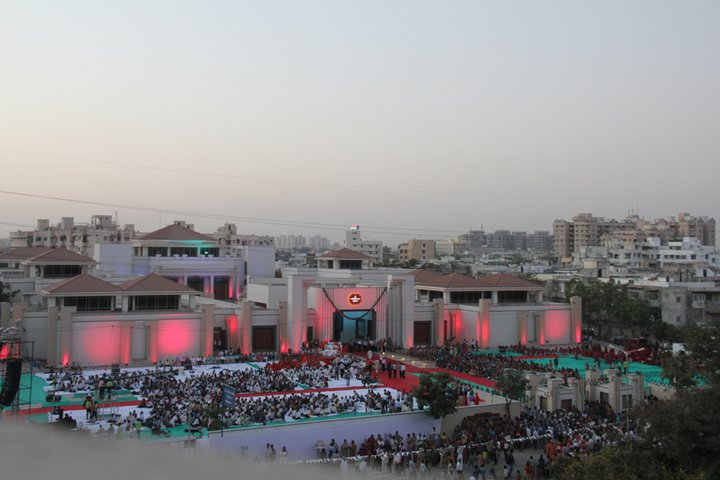

- Location within Ahmedabad Location within Gujarat Location within India
- Established: 8 March 2011
- Location: Naranpura, Ahmedabad
- Coordinates: 23.055°N 72.550°E
- Collection size: 3,000 artifacts used by Swaminarayan
- Website: www.swaminarayanmuseum.in

The Shree Swaminarayan Museum is a museum in Ahmedabad, Gujarat, India. It houses of three thousand personal objects of Swaminarayan, who is believed to be a manifestation of god in Swaminarayan Hinduism. It is a project undertaken to protect God Swaminarayan's objects of Prasadi (personal objects) which can be viewed by all people for darshan.

This is the first ever project in the Swaminarayan Sampraday to create this unity in all of God Swaminarayan's Prasadi objects from temples all over the world and will be a 175,000-square-foot (16,300 m^{2}) complex built on 30,000 square yards (25,000 m^{2}) with a total project cost of ₹ 10.5 Million. This museum was envisioned former Acharya Tejendraprasad of the Narnarayan Dev Gadi.

== History ==
During his lifetime, when Lord Swaminarayan went around village to village, on request from his followers he gave his belongings as 'prasadi' to his followers. This 'prasadi' is passed from generation to generation, and is still owned by hundreds of families. Swaminarayan temples also have their own collections, but items are usually not kept in an organized manner. The people who pass through them have no historical information about these items. Acharya Tejendraprasadji Maharaj has endeavored to establish this museum of Swaminarayan's belongings. He had some personal collections of Swaminarayan, and dreamed of gathering the 'prasadi' from the devotees. He intended to put all this collection, which gave a glimpse of Swaminarayan's life, in the museum. To fulfill this dream he passed on leadership of the Narnarayan Dev Gadi to his son, Koshalendraprasad in order to give full attention to this project. He agreed to celebrate his 60th birthday only on one condition, that all the donation and proceedings given by the devotees will be passed on towards the realization of this museum. This was the founding stone of the museum.

The museum was opened on 8 March 2011 by the Chief Minister of Gujarat, Narendra Modi. The ceremony started on 5 March 2011 and continued till 9 March 2011 in which 800,000 people participated. An organ donation camp was held on the museum premises on 8 March 2011 to coincide with the opening ceremony by Shatayu (a NGO). A total of 1600 - 900 women and 700 men - took the pledge for multi-organ donation.

== Layout ==
The museum itself takes up 30,000 square feet (2,800 m^{2}). Another 35,000 square feet (3,300 m^{2}) houses an office and guest house. The museum uses an audio visual system to take people around the complex. Along with this there is a mini theatre to showcase the life and times of Swaminarayan and a library with rare resources to help researchers and provide them with information on Swaminarayan. A workshop has been constructed to take special care of all the artifacts and sell replicas.

== Collection ==
The museum holds items such as Swaminarayan's writing scripts, everyday garments, ornaments, footprints, fragments of his hair, nails and many other items.

What makes this place unique is that it houses the only existing writing scripts with the signature of Swaminarayan. This document is a power of attorney given by Swaminarayan to Thakur Kubersingh to enable the latter to handle a land dispute at the Shri Swaminarayan Mandir, Ahmedabad. This document is the centerpiece of the museum.

== Sustainable construction ==
The museum has been set up keeping in mind the environment. Solar and wind energy power this air-conditioned museum which has been planned with a green cover of three hundred trees surrounding the building. Rainwater harvesting is done using an underground reservoir. Windows are double glazed and insulated, along with two outer walls and an insulated ceiling to help maintain the internal temperature and save electricity. Instead of bricks, fly ash blocks have been used for the structure.
