= Swaminarayan (disambiguation) =

Swaminarayan is the founder of the Swaminarayan Sampradaya, previously known as under his guru, Ramanand Swami, as the Uddhav Sampraday.

Swaminarayan may also refer to:

- Satsangi, a follower of Swaminarayan
- Swaminarayan arti, ceremonial song in the Swaminarayan tradition
- Swaminarayan Jayanti, The birthday of Swaminarayan
- Jai Swaminarayan, a greeting used by followers of Swaminarayan
