= Criticism of Swaminarayan Sampradaya =

Criticism of the Swaminarayan sect is varied from opposition of worship of Sahajanand Swami (or Swaminarayan) as God to opposition of his teachings on non-violence.

== Early criticism ==
Several years after the establishment of the sect, the 19th-century Hindu reformer Dayananda Saraswati questioned the acceptance of Sahajanand Swami aka Swaminarayan as God in the sect. In the view of Dayananda, it was a historical fact that Sahajanand decked himself out as Narayan to gain disciples. He was disapproving towards the idea that visions of Swaminarayan could establish a path to attaining perfection. Accused of deviating from the Vedas, his followers were criticised by Dayanand for the illegal collection of wealth and the "practice of frauds and tricks."

Swaminarayan was criticized for receiving large gifts from his followers after renouncing the world and assuming leadership of the fellowship. Swaminarayan responded that he accepts gifts because "it was appropriate for the person to give" and to satisfy the devotion of his followers but he did not seek it out of personal desire.

== Swaminarayan and Caste ==
Some scholars have cited excerpts from Swaminarayan sect literature, such as the Shikshapatri, to criticize Swaminarayan as supporting caste discrimination. Other scholars and the followers of the Swaminarayan sect dispute these criticisms, stating such criticism to be unsupported by the history and context of those statements. They argue that overall, Swaminarayan’s followers, practices and teachings helped reduce the oppressive nature of caste-based customs prevalent in that era and drew individuals of lower strata towards the Swaminarayan sect.

According to David Hardiman, the sect has had a class and caste bias and is an "ideological voice of commercial farmers and capitalist entrepreneurs" of Hinduism. The lower classes are attracted to it because they aspire the same success and mercantile ideology. It grew, states Hardiman, in an era of British colonial rule where land taxes were raised to unprecedented heights, lands were "snatched from village communities", and poverty spread. Sahajanand's pacifist approach to community re-organization and reaching out to the lowest classes of his day found support with the British rulers, but it also furthered their exploitation by the British, the local moneylenders and richer farmers. The followers of Swaminarayan "swallow the sect's view of the world uncritically", states Hardiman, and accept Shikshapatri teachings such as:

"None shall receive food and water, which are unacceptable at the hands of some people under scruples of caste system, may the same happen to the sanctified portions of the Shri Krishna, except at Jagannath Puri."

This excerpt has been interpreted as an endorsement of class and caste discrimination by the Swaminarayan sect. Vibhuti Parikh disagrees and states Swaminarayan used these instructions, possibly to gradually undermine the caste system without "negating it outright". According to Sadhu Mangalnidhidas, the historical facts suggest Swaminarayan did not encourage discrimination and did the opposite. For evidence, he states that in the early years of the Swaminarayan Sampradaya, high-caste Hindus criticized Swaminarayan for his teachings, inclusiveness, and practices that undermined caste-based discrimination. According to Kishorelal Mashruwala, “Swaminarayan was the first to bring about religious advancement of Shudras in Gujarat and Kathiawad region…And that became the main reason for many to oppose the Sampraday.”

An 1823 memorandum from a British official in the Asiatic Journal notes that the native upper classes “regret (as Hindus) the levelling nature of [Swaminarayan's] system” resulting in their violent opposition to and frequent merciless beatings of Swaminarayan’s disciples. Swaminarayan’s doctrine that everyone’s true self is the pure atma within which God resides, led him to reject caste-based discrimination and welcome those of all caste backgrounds equally in his religious community. According to Sadhu Mangalnidhidas and Vibhuti Parikh,, Swaminarayan rejected caste prejudices but practically accommodated 19th-century social norms and caste language in his public writings. The aim and strategy was to protect and reform the community, though it may have had "unintended negative consequences such as the reinforcement of caste identities".

Numerous historical accounts show that in practice Swaminarayan himself and his followers shared food and openly interacted with everyone without discrimination. When asked for clarity on his views on caste by Anglican Bishop Reginald Heber, Swaminarayan explained that since he considered the distinctions of caste to be ultimately false, “he did not give the subject much importance, but that he wished not to give offence,” and thus gestured towards some minor accommodations to the practice in his public writings.

== Criticism by Mahatma Gandhi ==
In 1918, Mahatma Gandhi issued two public appeals for Indians to enlist in the British army to fight in World War I. He asserted that fighting in the war would provide Indians necessary self-defense skills that had been eroded by the deep-seated influence of India’s ascetic culture, which he disdained.

This advocacy of violence led some of his staunchest supporters, including his nephew, Maganlal Gandhi, to question whether Gandhi was forsaking his non-violent ideals. In a July 1918 letter replying to his nephew, Gandhi stated that any conception of non-violence that prohibited self-defense was erroneous. To support this argument, Gandhi criticized the ethics of love and absolute ahimsa (non-violence) he observed in the teachings of Swaminarayan and Vallabhacharya. According to Gandhi, this love was mere “sentimentalism,” and its concomitant absolute ahimsa “robbed us of our manliness” and “made the people incapable of self-defence.” Gandhi wrote that Swaminarayan and Vallabhacharya had not grasped the essence of non-violence. Instead Gandhi argued for a non-violence that would “permit [our offspring] to commit violence, to use their strength to fight,” since that capacity for violence could be used for the benefit of society, like in “restraining a drunkard from doing evil” or “killing a dog…infected with rabies.”

By 1924, however, Gandhi’s views on Swaminarayan and his ethical teachings changed to some degree. While arguing in a Navjivan newspaper editorial that it was a duty to resort to violence for self-defense against Afghani terrorists, Gandhi admitted that he could not personally adopt this approach because he had chosen the path of love even against his enemies. Gandhi explained that, according to the Hindu scriptures, a single such self-controlled person could eradicate violence from the hearts of one’s opposition. It was through this power of love that Gandhi asserted, “what was accomplished in Gujarat by one person, Sahajanand [Swaminarayan], could not be accomplished by the power of the State.” Moreover, he said that “The Age of Sahajanand has not come to an end. It is only devotion and self-control like his that are wanted.” Ultimately, Gandhi said that while he was attempting Swaminarayan’s approach himself, he did “not have the strength of heart to act upon” it the way that Swaminarayan had successfully done.

== Modern Criticism ==
Some Hindus in the West criticized temples built by Pramukh Swami Maharaj as grandiose. As of November 2021, the lawsuits concerning the alleged use of forced labour in BAPS temples widened to the 5 American states. A BAPS spokesperson denied these allegations, stating that the artisans had come to the US as religious volunteers as part of their devotion, not as employees. By July 2023, 12 of the plaintiffs had withdrawn from the lawsuit citing religious conviction. In September 2025, the U.S. Department of Justice (DOJ) closed its four-year investigation into allegations of forced labor and wage violations, with no charges filed.

In 2023, Hindu leaders imposed a ban on the Vadtal Gadi faction of the Swaminarayan sect in Limbi, Gujarat, by passing 14 resolutions after they found the sect's adherents to have made murals depicting the Hindu god Hanuman sitting at the feet of Swaminarayan at the famous Shree Kashtabhanjan Dev Hanumanji Temple in Sarangpur, Gujarat, India.

== Sources ==
- Mangalnidhidas, Sadhu (2016). "Sahajanand Swami's Approach to Caste". In Raymond Brady Williams; Yogi Trivedi (eds.). Swaminarayan Hinduism : Tradition, Adaptation and Identity (1st ed.). New Delhi, India: Oxford University Press. pp. 115–128. ISBN 9780199086573. OCLC 948338914.
- Parikh, Vibhuti (2016). "The Swaminarayan Ideology and Kolis in Gujarat". In Raymond Brady Williams; Yogi Trivedi (eds.). Swaminarayan Hinduism : Tradition, Adaptation and Identity (1st ed.). New Delhi, India: Oxford University Press. pp. 94–114. ISBN 9780199086573. OCLC 948338914.
- Williams, Raymond Brady. (2001). An introduction to Swaminarayan Hinduism. Cambridge, UK: Cambridge University Press. ISBN 052165422X. OCLC 43615520.
