= Rakeshprasad =

Hindu spiritual leader (Born:1966)

Rakeshprasadji
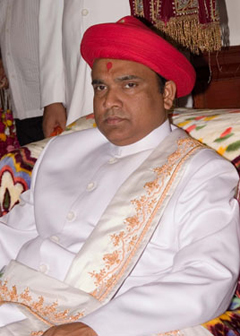

Personal life
- Born: 23 July 1966

Religious life
- Religion: Hinduism
- Philosophy: Swaminarayan Sampraday

Rakeshprasad (Devnagari: राकेशप्रसादजी; born 23 July 1966) is a Hindu spiritual leader. He is regarded by the devpaksh faction as the disputed leader of the LaxmiNarayan Dev Gadi.

An order by the Gujarat High Court restrained Ajendraprasadji Maharaj from acting as Acharya. This was a temporary order until the concluding court case. Ajendraprasad disputed this and filed a review petition in the Gujarat High Court. A satsang mahasabha headed by monks namely, Nautam Swami, self-appointed Rakeshprasad as their leader. Ajendraprasad's main ideology was that monks of the fellowship should stay in their prescribed rules and regulations. Especially after some monks had turned towards murdering fellow monks. Ajendraprasad at the time was firm and strong furied many monks to dispose of him.

Many of the sects followers, particularly in the siddhant paksh and outside of India, regard Ajendraprasad as acharya of the LaxmiNarayan Dev Gadi. Ajendraprasad is present in Vadtals Raghuveer Vadi; however, the courts are still unclear as to the genuine acharya.

== Swaminarayan Vadtal Gadi ==
The Vadtal gadi is known as LaxmiNarayan Dev Gadi or Dakshin Desh Gadi. The gadi was established by Swaminarayan and he appointed Raghuvirji Maharaj as the first head of the LaxmiNarayan Dev Gadi. Swaminarayan ordered his devotees whether monks or householders to obey their Acharya.

== Controversies ==
Sadhus under him have been charged of multiple crimes such as theft, corruption, and rape. The hanuman temple in Salangpur fell into controversy following a mural demeaning the Hindu god Hanuman in an inferior, kneeling position. Following protests and demands from other Hindu religious leaders to remove the mural, the devpaksh faction removed the mural.

Hundreds of followers of the faith took to protests in 2024 following a row of monks under Rakeshprasad being caught in various unethical practices. Over 50 monks were accused of indulging in immoral acts such as sexual assault on minors at a gurukul, brainwashing, forced abortions, operating businesses, etc. Police cases have been filed against some of the involved monks.

== See also ==
- Koshalendraprasad Pande of NarNarayan Dev Gadi
