= Narnarayan Dev Yuvak Mandal =

Hindu organisation

NarNarayan Dev Yuvak Mandal
- NNDYM Logo
- Abbreviation: NNDYM
- Formation: Year 1994
- Type: NGO
- Purpose: Humanitarian and religious
- Headquarters: Shri Swaminarayan Mandir, Ahmedabad
- Location: Around the World
- Members: Youth members of the International Swaminarayan Satsang Organization
- Leader: Koshalendraprasad Pande
- Parent organization: Narnarayan Dev Gadi
- Volunteers: 200,000 members in India and over 10,000 rest of the world
- Website: http://www.swaminarayan.info/nndym

NarNarayan Dev Yuvak Mandal (NNDYM) (Devnagari: नरनरायन देव युवक मनदल) was founded by Koshalendraprasad Pande (then pre-acharya) in 1994 with its headquarters at the Kalupur Swaminarayan Mandir (Ahmedabad) and was created to help young people to confront the challenges of life.

This step set into motion various initiatives by this organization to build a foundation of young people around the globe. The organisation propagates dharma (duty), bhakti (devotion), gnaan (knowledge), and vairagya (detachment from maya).

== Publications ==
- Divo/Insight

The goal stated for the InSight website is "to provide a forum for youths to discuss life in the western world while trying to balance and understand the philosophies of the Swaminarayan Sampraday", with an emphasis on humanity in addition to religiousness. It emphasizes understanding of the Swaminarayan Sampraday, the Nar Narayan Dev Gadi, under the acharya Koshalendraprasadji and Param Pujya, Lalji Maharaj 108 Shree Vrajendraprasadji Maharaj.

Satsangi youths provide content and the online platform allows readers to comment, discuss, and explore a Satsangi community.

== See also ==
- Swaminarayan
- Swaminarayan Sampraday
- ISSO (Swaminarayan)
- Swaminarayan Museum
