= Raghuvir (spiritual leader) =

Raghuvirji (21 Mar 1812 - 9 Feb 1863), known to devotees as "Sanatan Dharma Dhurandar Acharya Maharaj Shree 1008 Raghuvirji Maharaj", was the first acharya of the LaxmiNarayan Dev Gadi of the ShriSwaminarayan Sampraday sect of Hinduism. He was the son of Iccharam, Lord Swaminarayan's younger brother. He was adopted by Swaminarayan as his son and he was the first successor of Swaminarayan in the southern diocese (Laxmi Narayan Dev Gadi, Vadtal). He was enthroned as acharya there on 10 November 1826 and held the post till his death. He was the first acharaya to wear the red topi hat, as (Ayodhyaprasad), the then-acharaya of the Nar Narayan Dev Gadi liked to wear a white pagh The acharya's responsibilities and duties are outlined in many of the sect's scriptures.
