= Ahmedabad high-speed railway station =

High-speed railway station in Gujarat, India

Ahmedabad

General information
- Location: Kalupur, Ahmedabad GJ; India
- Coordinates: 23°01′30″N 72°36′10″E
- Elevation: 68 metres (223 ft)
- Owner: National High Speed Rail Corporation Limited (NHSRC)
- Line: Mumbai–Ahmedabad high-speed rail corridor
- Connections: Ahmedabad Junction; Blue Line Kalupur

Construction
- Structure type: Elevated

Other information
- Status: Under construction

History
- Opening: 2029
Route map
Key
- Source
Location
- Location within Gujarat Location within India
- Interactive map

Ahmedabad high-speed railway station is an under construction high-speed railway station on the Mumbai–Ahmedabad high-speed rail corridor. This station is located near Ahmedabad Junction railway station in Kalupur, Ahmedabad, Gujarat, India. It is the eleventh station of the Mumbai–Ahmedabad high-speed rail corridor, after Anand-Nadiad station and before Sabarmati station.

== Construction ==
The National High-Speed Rail Corporation Limited (NHSRCL) had invited tenders for Package "C7" of the Mumbai-Ahmedabad high-speed rail corridor (MAHSR) in October 2020, with a deadline of 4.5 years. In October 2021, Ircon International–Dineshchandra R. Agrawal Infracon (JV) won the tender. The NSHRCL signed a contract with the JV for the design and construction of the high-speed railway viaduct through Ahmedabad, Ahmedabad and Sabarmati stations in December 2021. In August 2021, the JV began construction on the station, after acquiring around 3 hectares of land by taking area of platforms no. 11 and 12 of Ahmedabad Junction railway station, with a deadline of 4.5 years. The station is slated to be completed by August 2026, the time also slated for opening of the Gujarat section of the high-speed rail corridor.

== Lines ==
The station will be served by the Mumbai–Ahmedabad high-speed rail corridor, and will be the eleventh station of the Mumbai–Ahmedabad high-speed rail corridor in Ahmedabad.

== Structure ==
The station will have two platforms and two tracks for regular services. It will have three levels–the platform, concourse and service floor as the entrance level. Below the concourse level will be the platforms no. 11 and 12 of Ahmedabad Junction railway station. The service or the entrance level will be located facing east of platform no. 12 of the railway station. The design of the station will be inspired by the Sidi Saiyyed Mosque, one of the most famous mosques of Ahmedabad. The station area will have 2 platforms of 425 m (1,394 ft) length for 16-coach E5 Series Shinkansen trains.

== Features ==
The station will have all modern and advanced facilities and amenities for customers and passengers, distinct from Indian Railway stations and similar to airports. Its design has been made to accommodate sufficient space for passenger movement and amenities at the concourse and platform areas. There will be ticketing and waiting areas, a business-class lounge, a nursery, restrooms, smoking rooms, information booths, retail centres and a public information and announcement system. Moreover, skylight provisions will be present on the roof and exterior sides for natural lighting and reduced energy usage. The station will be developed as a transport hub through integration with all basic modes of transportation for better, faster and hassle-free connectivity to and from the station, such as autos, metro, buses and taxis. The concourse level of the station will be directly connected with the nearby metro station through skywalks and underground walkways. Such features will be available in all 12 stations of the Mumbai-Ahmedabad high-speed rail corridor.

== Connectivity ==
=== Road ===
The station is being built just next to Ahmedabad Junction railway station, towards east. Because of this location, it will be accessible easily from the entire city through the railway station, as it will be integrated with the station from platforms no. 11 and 12 through skywalks and multiple entry/exit points in different platforms of the railway station. It will be also accessible through the existing station road on the station's east side that connects with the city's major roads. Most of the stations being built in the Gujarat section of the Mumbai–Ahmedabad high-speed rail corridor are located near or next to state or national highways, in order to provide better and direct connectivity to the stations.

=== Rail ===
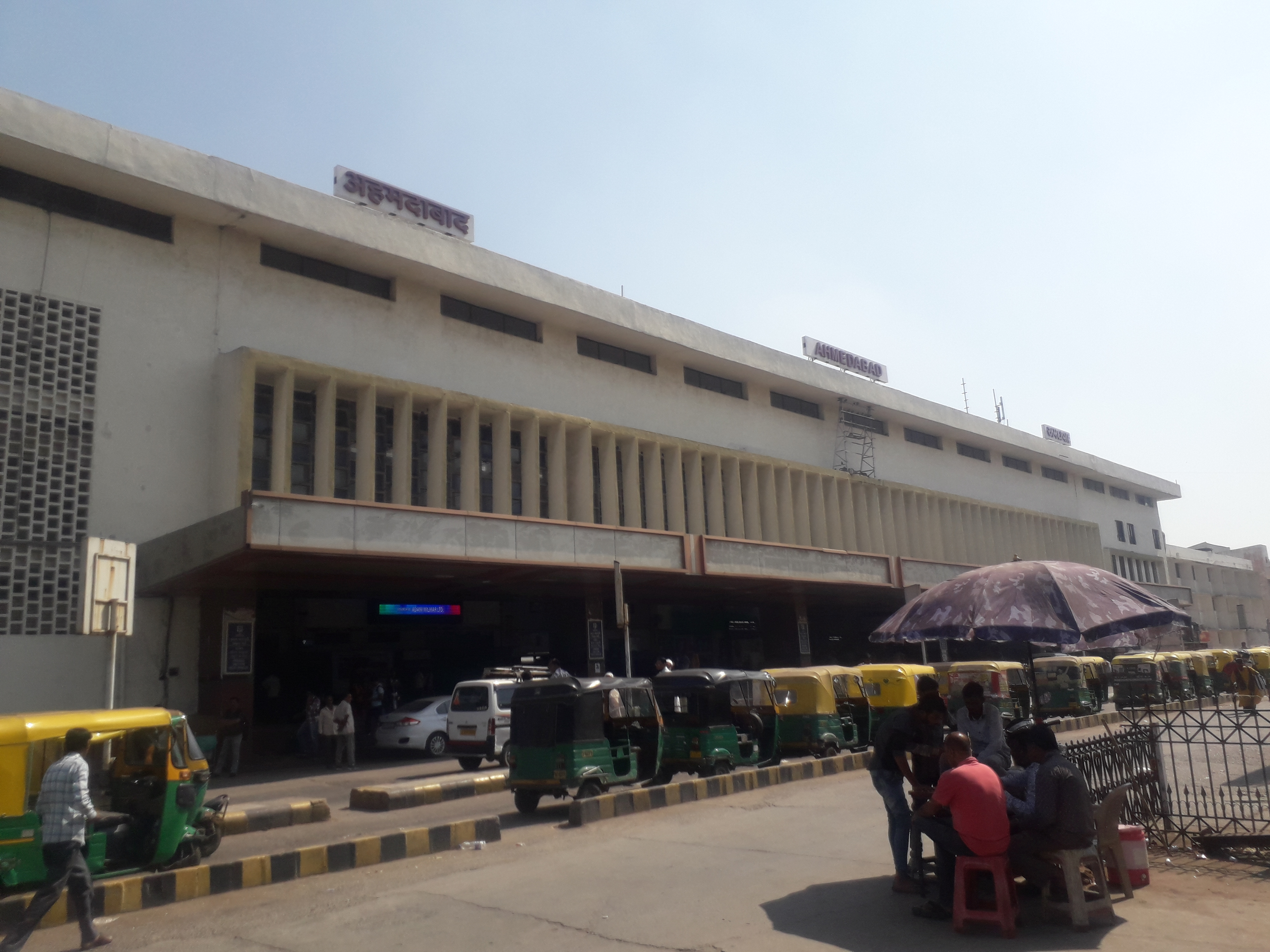
Ahmedabad Junction railway station

The nearest railway station will be Ahmedabad Junction railway station, on which the station will be located over platforms no. 11 and 12.

=== Metro ===
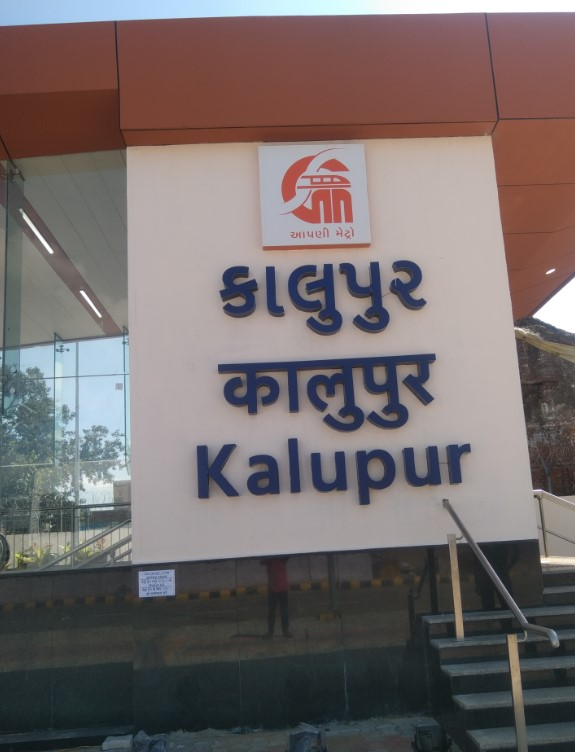
Kalupur Railway metro station of Red Line (Line 2) of Ahmedabad Metro

The station is being built just next to Kalupur metro station of Red Line (Line 2) of Ahmedabad Metro, towards west, located just a few hundred metres away from the entrance level of the station. The concourse level of the station will be integrated with skywalks and underground walkways to connect with the metro station.

=== Air ===
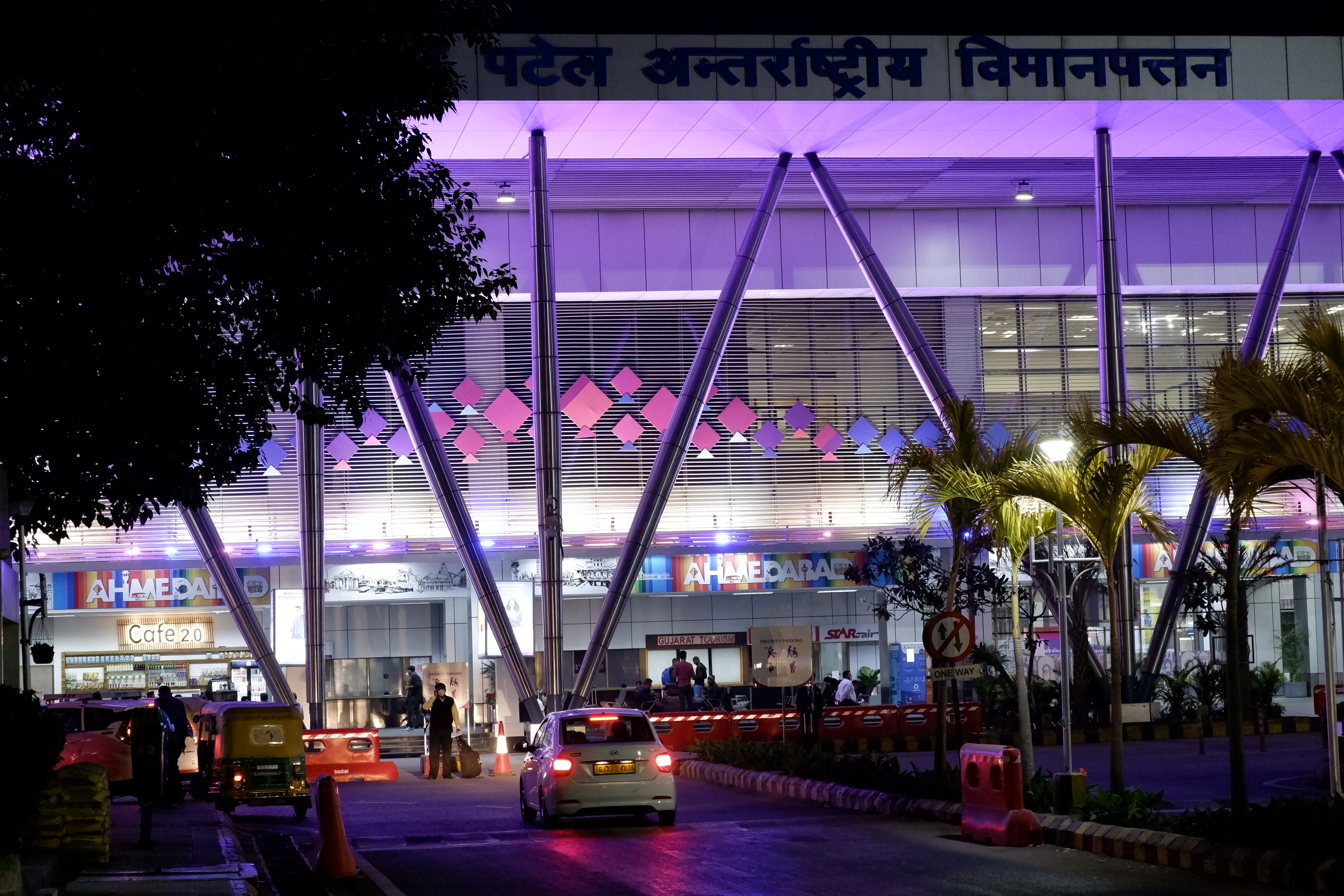
Sardar Vallabhbhai Patel International Airport

The nearest airport after the station's completion will be Sardar Vallabhbhai Patel International Airport, located around 10 km (6.2 mi) north-east from the station.

== See also ==
- High-speed rail in India
- Ahmedabad Metro
- Ahmedabad Junction railway station
- Sidi Saiyyed Mosque
- Mumbai-Ahmedabad high-speed rail corridor
- National High Speed Rail Corporation Limited
