= International Swaminarayan Satsang Mandal =

Hindu organisation

The International Swaminarayan Satsang Mandal (ISSM) is a religious organisation of the Hindu faith based in USA. It comes under the Laxmi Narayan Dev Gadi of the Shree Swaminarayan Sampraday. The organisation has temples and centres in various parts of the country as well as a temple in Chicago, Illinois (America).

"International Swaminarayan Satsang Mandal" is a federally registered trade mark of ISSO of Chicago, Inc. in the USA. Currently, ISSM has been Associated with SS-AUSM, SS-AUSM still remains with Shri Swaminarayan Mandir, Chicago (Wheeling). LNDYM Youth wing has been established under SS-AUSM in order to spread the Swaminarayan Sampraday.

== Temples ==
ISSM originally had six temples under it, all of them being named Vadtal Dham after Vadtal in India, where the headquarters of the parent organisation is located. The temple in Grand Prairie is an exception, being named Gadhpur Dham after the Swaminarayan temple in Gadhada.

- Grand Prairie: Opened on 4 July 1991, when the image of Swaminarayan in the form of Ghanshyam was installed by present Acharya Shree Ajendraprasad Pande of the Vadtal Gadi.
- Chicago (Wheeling): This temple was dedicated in 1991. It has the titles Vadtal Dham, Vadtal of USA, ISSM, and ISSO of Chicago The central deity in this temple is Swaminarayan in the form of Ghanshyam by present acharya Ajendraprasadji Maharaj.
- New Jersey: Inaugurated on 14 June 2017 by Bhavi Acharya Nrigendraprasadji Maharaj in Monmouth Junction, New Jersey.
- Scranton: Dedicated in 2014, murtis were installed by P.P. 108 Bhavi Acharya Shree Nrigendraprasadji Maharaj. "Vadtal Gadi".
- Richmond: Also dedicated in 2014 and murtis were installed by Nrigendraprasadji Maharaj. "Vadtal Gadi".
- Houston, Texas: Also dubbed Vadtal Dham, this Mandir is being built in Houston under the command of Ajendraprasadji Maharaj
- Monmouth Junction: Pratistha date is being planned in summer of 2017 under the guidance of Ajendraprasadji. This mandir has Saturday Satsang at 5:00 pm. "Vadtal Gadi".
- Downey: This temple was dedicated in 2000. The temple has images of Lakshmi Narayan and Swaminarayan in the form of Ghanshyam also by Ajendraprasadji
- Racine, WI: Shree Swaminarayan Hindu Temple Racine has been opened for Darshan. Official Murti Pran Pratishtha is still under planning, but very near.
- London: LNDYM London has been holding weekly Satsang sabhas and are currently seeking a permanent place of worship.
- Australia: LNDYM Australia holds bi-weekly Satsang Sabhas in Various cities.
- Congo: P.P. Lalji Shree Nrigendraprasadji Maharaj performed Pratishtha in February 2014 and holds daily Satsang sabhas. This is also the headquarters of LNDYM Africa.
- Seychelles: LNDYM Seychelles currently is allied with NNDYM Seychelles to continue spreading Satsang on the island.
- Dubai: LNDYM Dubai currently holds Satsang sabhas at satsangis' homes.

Since the authoring of this article, Downey, New Jersey (Vadtaldhamusa), and Dallas have removed themselves from ISSM and now participate an independent to-be-named organization
