= Lakshmi Narayan Dev Gadi =

Diocese of the Swaminarayan Sampradaya located in Vadtal

- Urdhva Pundra Tilak
- Formation: 1800 (226 years ago)
- Founder: Swaminarayan
- Type: Religious organization
- Purpose: Philanthropic, Religious studies, Spirituality
- Headquarters: Vadtal, Gujarat, India
- Location: Vadtal
- Coordinates: 22.59°N 72.87°E
- Website: www.swaminarayan.faith www.swaminarayanvadtalgadi.org

The Lakshmi Narayan Dev Gadi (Gujarati:- લક્ષ્મીનારાયણ દેવ ગાદી) is one of the two gadis (diocese) that together form the Swaminarayan Sampradaya. It is headquartered at the Shri Swaminarayan Mandir, Vadtal and controls the Dakshin Vibhag Lekh.

== History ==
At Vadtal, on Prabodhini Ekadashi of Vikram Samvat 1882, Swaminarayan established two Gadis, the Nar Narayan Dev Gadi, headquartered at Ahmedabad, and the Lakshminarayan Dev Gadi, headquartered at Vadtal. He adopted his nephews Ayodhyaprasadji Pande, son of elder brother Rampratapji, and Raghuvirji Pande, son of younger brother Ichcharamji, as his sons. They were known as Dharmavanshi Acharyas, meaning "belonging to the lineage of Dharmadev", Swaminarayan's father. Swaminarayan instructed the cousins to draw lots, to decide who would be seated on which Gadi. Ayodhyaprasadji Maharaj was appointed the inaugural Acharya of the Nar Narayan Dev Gadi (also known as the Uttar Vibhag - Northern division), whilst Raghuveerji Maharaj became the inaugural Acharya of the Lakshminarayan Dev Gadi (also known as the Dakshin Vibhag - Southern division).

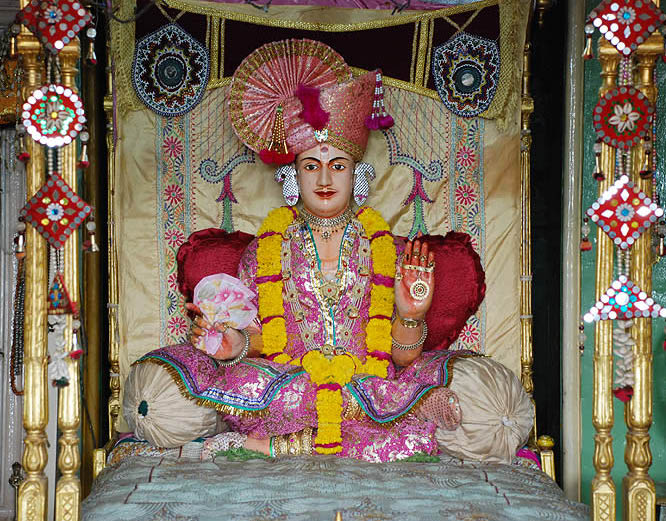
Ghanshyam Maharaj in the Akshar Bhuvan at the Lakshminarayan Dev Gadi headquarters

The administrative division between the two is set forth in minute detail in a document written by Swaminarayan, called Desh Vibhag Lekh. The method by which future Acharyas are to be appointed is enshrined in the document Desh Vibhag Lekh.

He installed them as the Acharyas for all followers, including householders and ascetics. Swaminarayan gave sole authority to these two individuals to install murtis in temples and to initiate sadhus and householders into the Sampradaya. He did this using a legal document known as "Desh Vibhag no Lekh", which he dictated and was written by Shukanand Swami. Learned saints and elder satsangis witnessed this document. Copies were presented to the inaugural Acharyas, Ayodhyaprasad Pande and Raghuvir Pande – these are currently in the possession of the current Acharyas. The document was accepted by the Bombay High Court as the authoritative document regarding the apportionment of the two dioceses, so it has legal standing. Presently, Acharya Maharajshri Ajendraprasadji Maharaj is at the head of Lakshmi Narayan Dev Gadi, while Acharya Maharajshri Koshalendraprasadji Maharaj is at the head of the Nar Narayan Dev Gadi at Ahmedabad.

== Organizational structure ==
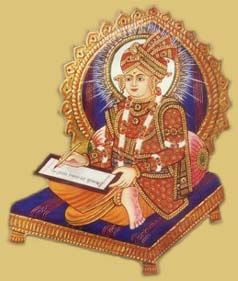
Illustration of Swaminarayan writing the Shiskhapatri

=== Importance of Acharyas ===
Swaminarayan thought that as he had established the temples and the Swaminarayan Sampradaya, he wanted to keep his sadhus free from the affairs dealing with wealth, power and other worldly affairs. He decided to create leaders who would subsequently be responsible for the Swaminarayan Sampradaya. This led to his decision to appoint his nephews as Acharyas. The constitution of the Sampradaya is laid out in Desh Vibhag Lekh which describes in detail the functions of the Acharyas.

... it is my command to all sadhus, bhamcharis and all satsangies, that for the purpose of your kalyaan (emancipation) you must obey and follow the two Acharyas of Dharmavansh, and obey their commands by thought, action and speech. If this is compromised and whoever turns elsewhere (rejecting the Acharyas) will find that they will never find sukh (happiness) in this world or the worlds beyond and will experience immense distress ... ― Desh Vibhag Lekh

The Acharyas of the Sampradaya are administrative heads, spiritual leaders and the gurus of their followers. Since the acharyas are supposed to refrain from contact with the opposite sex, except close relations, the acharyas' wives are the gurus for female members of the sect, and must avoid contact with unfamiliar men. The acharyas wear a red turban, and carry a golden staff and umbrella, the symbols of their authority In the scripture Purushottam Prakash (Nishkulanand Kavya), the writer Nishkulanand Swami describes Swaminarayan's establishment of the Dharmavanshi Acharyas.

The Acharyas are responsible for:

- Initiating followers into the organization with a Samanya Diksha by giving the guru-mantra
- Initiating monks-sadhus by giving them the Maha-Bhagwadi Diksha
- Perform murti-pratishtha, installing deities in the temples
- Authenticating scriptures of the Sampradaya
- Acting as the Guru and leader of the entire Sampradaya

These responsibilities are prescribed in the holy texts Shikshapatri, Satsangi Jeevan and Desh Vibhag Lekh, according to which no person other than the Dharmavanshi Acharyas may carry out these duties.

In one of the most authoritative scriptures, the Vachanamrut, Swaminarayan states one of the prerequisites for attaining Akshardham. He wrote, "The devotee who is aashrit of Dharmakul (i.e. he who has received initiation from Dharmavanshi Acharya and remains loyal to the Acharya) gets a divine Bhram-state body by God's wish." It is seen as imperative to be a humble, loyal follower of the Dharmavanshi Acharya once receiving the diksha (guru mantra) in order to achieve a bhram form. In Swamini Vato, Swaminarayan was quoted, "Even Gunatitanand Swami, one of the main sadhus of Swaminarayan states, 'He who insults the temples, Acharyas, sadhus and satsangis will find his roots being destroyed and will inevitably fall from the satsang.' "

=== Membership ===
Male satsangis are initiated by the acharya of the gadi they come under. Female satsangis are initiated by the wife of the acharya, who is the leader of women in the Swaminarayan Sampradaya. In the absence of the acharya, ascetics perform this initiation, which is then confirmed by the acharya on his next visit. The ceremony involves the taking of five vows (panch vartaman): not to commit adultery or robbery, not to consume intoxicants or meat and not to lie. The initiator then pours water over the initiate's hands, gives him a Sanskrit shloka, Shri Krishna twam gatirmama, meaning Shri Krishna thou art my refuge. The initiate then offers at least half a rupee to the acharya, who adorns a kanthi thread around the initiate's neck. The initiate is then required to apply the tilak chandlo to his forehead (chandan U and red kum kum dot in the middle). Ladies only apply the red kum kum dot.

There are eight important things in the life of a Satsangi; these are Kanthi – a thread worn around the neck, the Tilak Chandlo – a holy mark, the Mala – a thread with 108 beads, Nitya Pooja – daily prayers, the Temple, Darshan – a form of worship, Aarti – a ceremony, and Vandu Pad and Chesta Pad – verses recited in the temples daily. A Satsangi must show reverence for God, the Shastras, the Acharya of the Gadi the Satsangi comes under (Nar Narayan Dev Gadi or Lakshmi Narayan Dev Gadi), festivals, elders and be of overall good conduct.

Upon initiation, Satsangi make 11 vows, called Niyams (Rules):

- Be non-violent
- Do not have any kind of relationship with a woman other than your wife
- Do not eat meat, including seafood, poultry products or eggs
- Do not drink products that contain alcohol, including medicines
- Never touch a widow woman whom you do not know
- Never commit suicide in any circumstances
- Do not steal
- Never blame others for something that you may not know about
- Never disparage God, Goddesses, or any religion
- Never eat someone's food who does not follow these eleven rules
- Never listen to holy stories from an atheist.

=== Ascetics ===
From the beginning, ascetics have played a major role in the Swaminarayan Sampradaya. They contribute towards growth and development of the movement and towards the salvation of its members. Sadhus, initiated by either Dharmavanshi Acharya, also form an integral part of the organization and wear only orange robes. The Brahmachari ascetics, who are Brahmins, have a special responsibility of taking care of images in temples. These ascetics wear white robes on their waist and an orange cloth over their shoulder. Ascetics lead a strict life, refraining from worldly pleasures and devoting their lives to the service of the holy fellowship. They preach the philosophy and lifetimes of Swaminarayan and encourage people to follow a pious and religious life. Swaminarayan has stated in the Vachanamrut that the association of Satpurush (true saints/devotees) opens the path to salvation. In 1999, the Ahmedabad Gadi had 765 male ascetics and the Vadtal Gadi 1468 male ascetics.

The first rule of becoming an ascetic (sanyasi) of the sect is never to come in contact with the opposite sex, or money. Ascetics are not allowed to leave the temple alone; they have to move out in pairs. Even in the temple, while using the toilet, they must do so in pairs to ensure they keep their vows. The food they eat must be mixed up so that they may not taste it.

Female ascetics, known as Samkhya yoginis, receive initiation from the Gadiwala, or wife of the Acharya. They stay within the temple, follow ascetic rules strictly, wear dark red clothing and stay in the temple Haveli. They take care of the images in women's temples and conduct discourses for women. In 1999, the Ahmedabad Gadi had 440 female ascetics and the Vadtal Gadi had 115 female ascetics.

The Government of India intervened by setting up an arbitration panel in June 2001. A settlement was brokered by a panel between the two factions in June 2002, but the Dev faction led by Nautam Swami (Mahant of the Vadtal temple) refused to cooperate, leading to an intensification of the dispute. A number of sadhus of this faction were subsequently exposed in a sex scandal only three months after another five sadhus were sentenced to death for murdering their guru in the Vadtal branch.

=== Organizations within Lakshmi Narayan Dev Gadi ===
- International Swaminarayan Satsang Mandal
- Shree Swaminarayan Agyna Upasana Satsang Mandal

-The Shree Swaminarayan Agyna Upasana Satsang Mandal (SSAUSM) is an original organization based in United States that comes under the Lakshminarayan Dev Gadi, Vadtal. It has several temples in the US, all of which are named Vadtal Dham after the parent organization. The very first Vadtal Mandir in USA falls under SSAUSM leadership. The Swaminarayan Mandir in Wheeling, IL was established by Acharya Ajendraprasadji Maharaj.

- Hanuman temple, Salangpur
- Shree Swaminarayan Gurukul Rajkot Sansthan
- Shree Swaminarayan Mandir Kundaldham Sansthan (SMK)
- Sardhar Sansthan
- Swaminarayan Rustumbhag
- Pancheswardham
- Jetpur Gadisthan

== Acharyas ==
The following table lists all of the Acharyas to date.

Acharya Number	Name of Acharya	Born on	Became Acharya on	Retirement	Death	Term
1	Acharya Shree Raghuvirji Maharaj	21 Mar 1812	10 Nov 1826	12 Nov 1856	9 Feb 1863	37 Years
2	Acharya Shree Bhagvatprasadji Maharaj	11 Oct 1838	9 Feb 1863	10 Aug 1879	12 Aug 1879	17 Years
3	Acharya Shree Viharilalji Maharaj	19 Apr 1852	12 Aug 1879	-------	27 Sep 1899	20 Years
4	Acharya Shree Lakshmiprasadji Maharaj	15 Aug 1892	27 Sep 1899	18 Mar 1909	24 Apr 1909	10 Years
5	Acharya Shree Shripatiprasadji Maharaj	18 Aug 1875	26 Apr 1909	15 Dec 1930	12 Feb 1931	22 Years
6	Acharya Shree Anandprasadji Maharaj	22 Jul 1906	12 Feb 1931	30 Apr 1959	8 Jul 1974	28 Years
7	Acharya Shree Narendraprasadji Maharaj	25 Jan 1930	30 Apr 1959	13 May 1984	23 Jan 1986	25 Years
8	Acharya Shree Ajendraprasadji Maharaj	16 Aug 1949	13 May 1984	present	present	Active

The next Acharya of the Vadtal Gadi is Bhavi Acharya Shree Nrugendra Prasadji Maharaj. The Supreme Court has recognized his status as the next Acharya of Vadtal and granted use of designation Bhavi (future) Acharya. He performs duties on behalf of Ajendraprasad. The case around the current head of the branch is currently in legal litigation.

There is currently an active court case regarding the Vadtal Gadi. Gujarat High court has stayed the order removing Ajendraprsadji Maharaj until a final verdict is reached. He cannot enjoy the right of acharya during the proceedings. The dev paksh faction has appointed Rakeshprasad as their acharya in the Gadi.

Siddhant paksh maintains that Ajendraprasad Pande is the current Acharya of the Vadtal Gadi and welcome his son, Nrigendraprasad Pande, to officiate at functions in Swaminarayan temples in his absence.

== Charitable activities ==
SVG Charity, a subsidiary of the Vadtal diocese gadi, is involved in disaster relief, food, medicine, and blood donations across its chapters in the United States, Europe, Canada, and India.

The Vadtal Dham Swaminarayan Hindu Temple in Monmouth Junction, New Jersey distributed free PPE kits during the COVID-19 lockdown to provide access to masks and sanitizer within its local community. They also conducted food drives for local Food Pantries.

Vadtal Dham Shree Swaminarayan Hindu Temple Houston, in conjunction with other regional Hindu organizations and Sewa International, helped distribute 16,500 pounds of food during the COVID-19 crisis along with PPE kits with drive-through events to help communities in need.

== See also ==
- Swaminarayan
- Swaminarayan Sampradaya
