= Koshalendraprasad Pande =

Indian Hindu guru (born 1972)

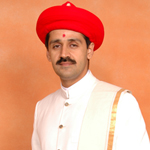
- Pande in 2007

Personal life
- Born: 18 October 1972 (age 53) Ahmedabad, India
- Honors: 7th Acharya, Narnarayan Dev Gadi

Religious life
- Religion: Hinduism
- Philosophy: Swaminarayan Sampraday

Koshalendraprasad Pande (born 18 October 1972) is the current acharya of the NarNarayan Dev Gadi of the Swaminarayan Sampraday (15 October 2004 – present) and is the 7th successor of Swaminarayan in the North Diocese (NarNarayan Dev Gadi, Ahmedabad).

== Biography ==
Koshalendraprasad Pande was born on 18 October 1972 in Ahmedabad, India. He is the eldest son of Tejendraprasad Pande, the 6th acharya of the NarNarayan Dev Gadi of the Swaminarayan Sampraday. Per tradition in Brahmin households, Pande received his Yajñopavītam, or sacred thread, during the bicentennial celebrations of Swaminarayan in 1981 at Kalupur Swaminarayan Mandir. He studied at St. Xavier School and St. Xavier College in Ahmedabad. He was appointed as acharya on 15 October 2004.

== Works ==
- He established Narnarayan Dev Yuvak Mandal (NNDYM).
- He started celebration of festivals such as Shardha Satabdi Mahotav, Shashti Purti Mahotsav and the Chhapaiya Nij Mandir Pran Pratishta Mahotsav.
- He took an initiative for broadcast of TV series Jai Shree Swaminarayan throughout the world.

== See also ==
- Swaminarayan Sampraday
- NarNarayan Dev Gadi
- Tejendraprasad
