= Kalupur =

- town
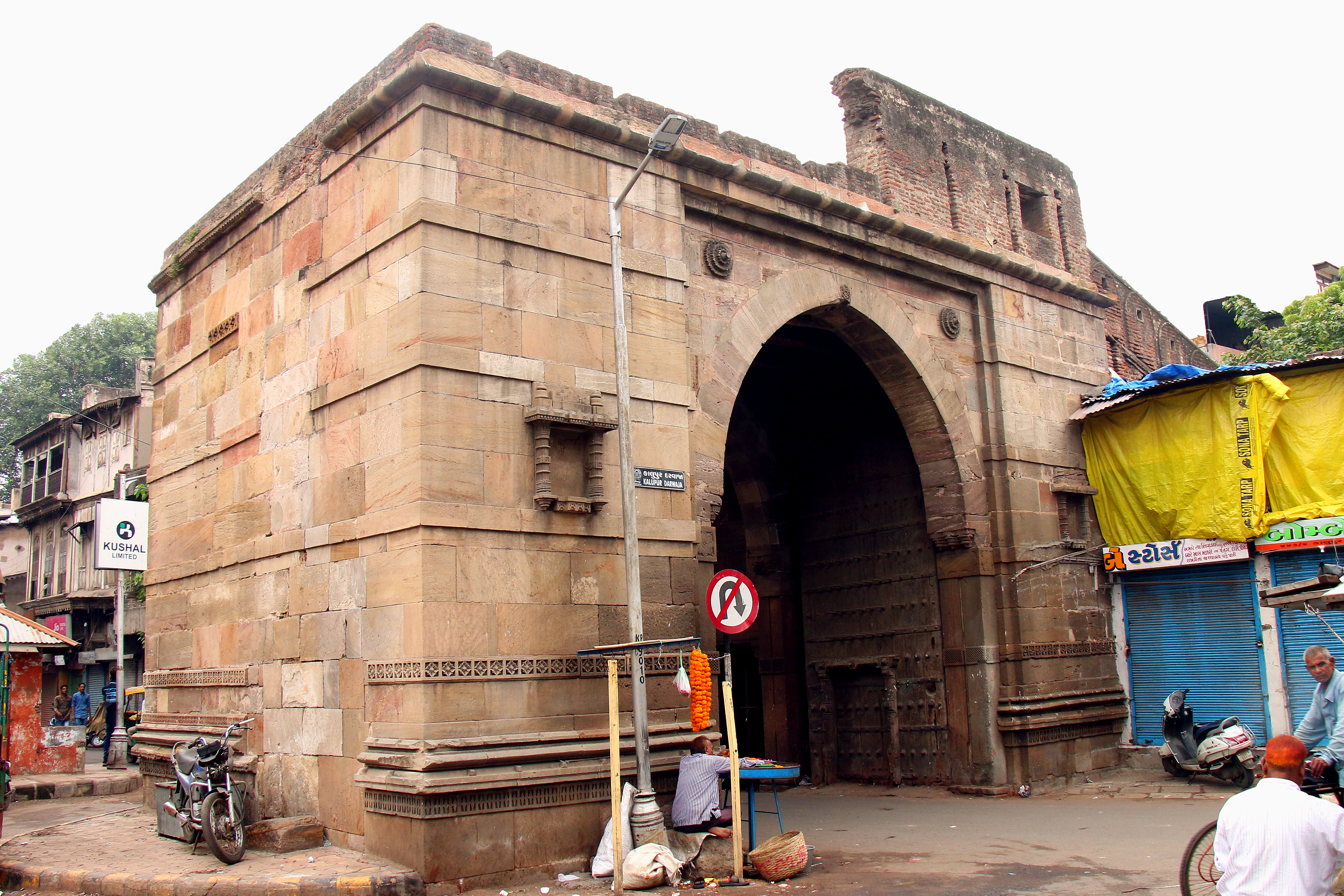
- Kalupur Darwaja

- Location in Ahmedbad, Gujarat, India Kalupur (Gujarat) Kalupur (India)
- Coordinates: 23°1′45″N 72°36′1″E
- Country: India
- State: Gujarat

Languages
  - Official: Gujarati, Hindi
- Time zone: UTC+5:30 (IST)
- PIN: 380001
- Telephone code: 079
- Vehicle registration: GJ
- Nearest city: Ahmedabad
- Website: gujaratindia.com

Kalupur is a central area in Ahmedabad, the financial centre of Gujarat, India.

== Geography ==
It is located at 23°1′45″N 72°36′1″E.

== Location ==
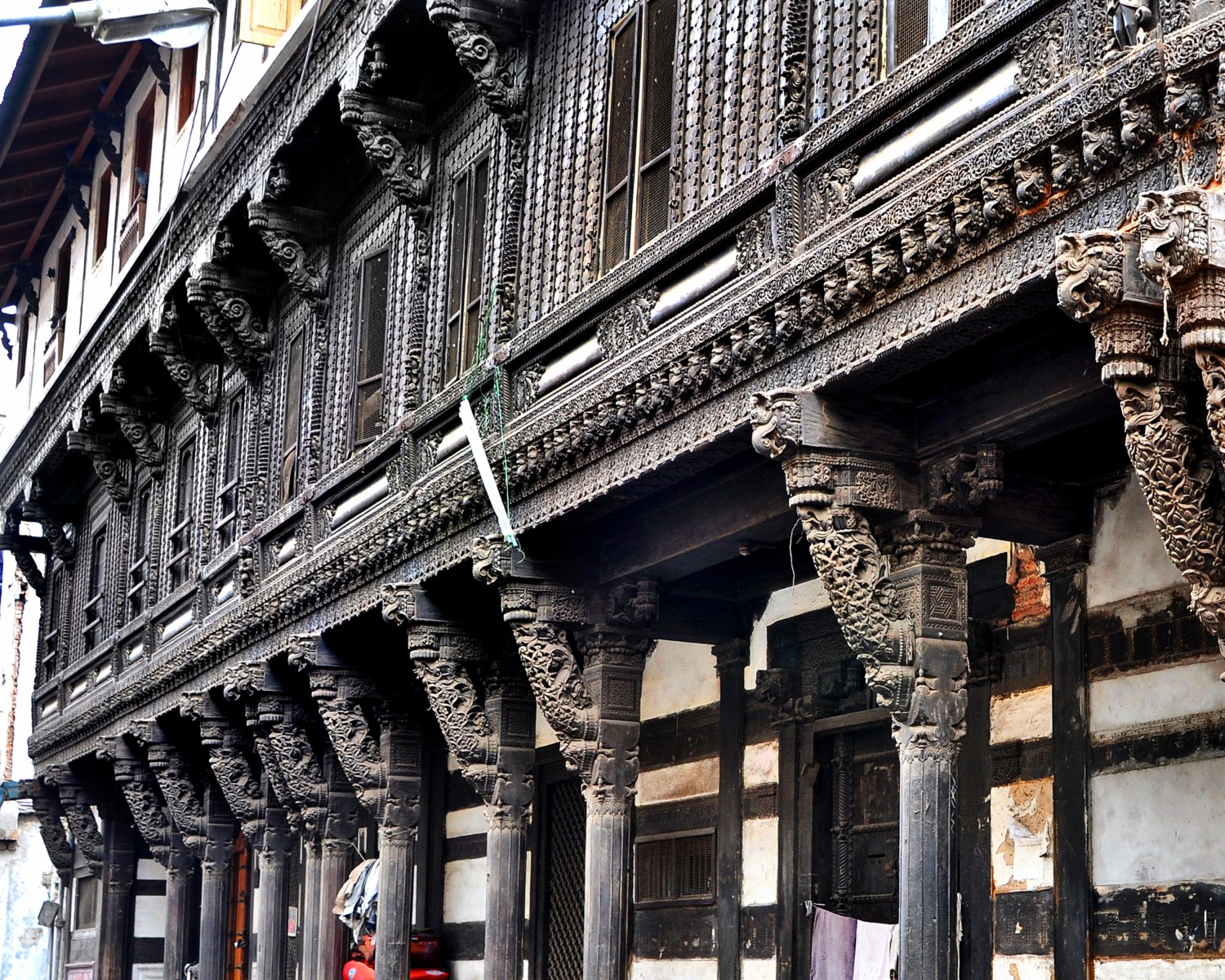
Wooden haveli, Old City, Kalupur Tankshal area

Kalupur is the central part of Ahmedabad city. Kalupur Bus Station runs buses to all major destinations in Ahmedabad city. The station is operated by Ahmedabad Municipal Transport Service (AMTS).

Ahmedabad's main central railway station is also at Kalupur.

== Places of interest ==
Shri Swaminarayan Temple, Ahmedabad is a shrine situated at Kalupur. This is the first temple of the Shri Swaminarayan Sampraday. The temple enshrines images of Lord Narnarayandev, Lord Radhakrishna Dev, Lord Dharmadev-BhaktiMata, Lord Harikrishna Maharaj, Lord Ghanshyam Maharaj and Lord Balswaroop Ghanshyam Maharaj.
