= Jai Swaminarayan =

Hindu religious term

Jai Swaminarayan (also spelled Jay Swaminarayan; Devnagari: जय स्वमिनारायन, Jaya Svaminārāyan; Gujarati:જય સ્વામિનારાયણ, Jaya Svāmīnārāyaṇ) is a notable religious term used in the Swaminarayan Sampraday religious sect for both ritual and social purposes, literally meaning "Hail Swaminarayan bhagwan". Within the Swaminarayan Sampraday, the term is used as a greeting. However, the phrase doubles in meaning, being used as a greeting but also as a farewell. It reflects the idea that everything one says or begins with should start with God's name. People from this sect of Swaminarayan use it to begin and conclude conversations, meetings, phone calls, and religious gatherings. Followers of other faiths use similar terms about their own deities (fr example: Jai Sri Krishna or Jai Ganesha). Presently, this term is used in daily puja rituals worldwide amongst the Swaminarayan Sampraday.
