= Hanuman temple, Salangpur =

Famous Hanumanji temple in Gujarat

Shree Kashtabhanjandev Hanuman Temple, Sarangpur
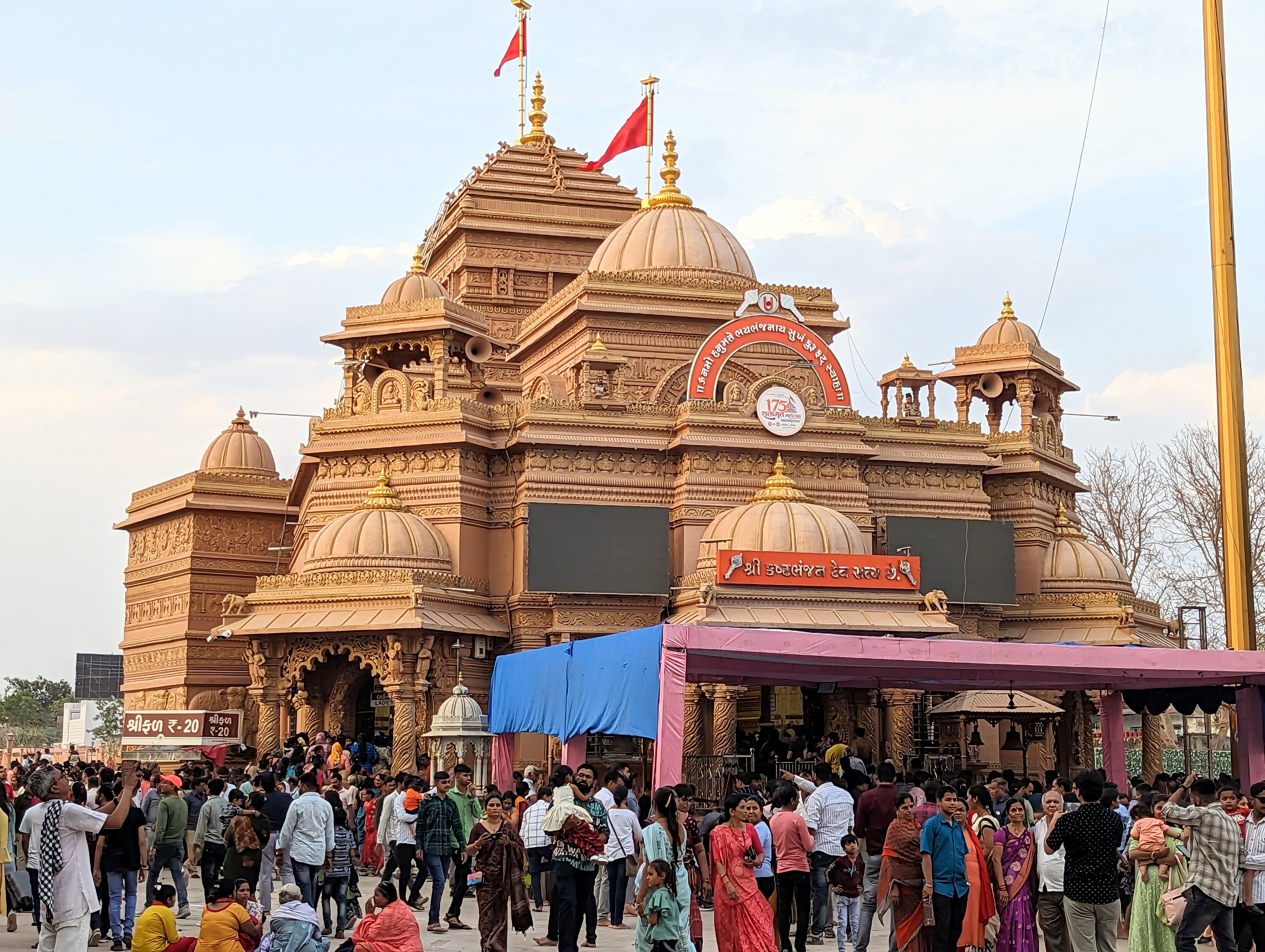

Religion
- Affiliation: Hinduism
- Deity: Hanuman in the form of Kashtabhanjan, Swaminarayan

Location
- Location: Sarangpur, Gujarat
- Country: India
- Interactive map of Shree Kashtabhanjandev Hanuman Temple, Sarangpur
- Coordinates: 22°09′31.8″N 71°46′15.57″E

Architecture
- Founder: Gopalanand Swami

Website
- https://www.salangpurhanumanji.org/

Hanuman temple, Salangpur or Shree Kashtabhanjan Dev Hanumanji Temple, Sarangpur is a Hindu temple located in Sarangpur, Gujarat and is part of the Vadtal Gadi of the Swaminarayan Sampradaya. The term Kashtabhanjan Dev literally means "Crusher of Sorrows."

== History and description ==
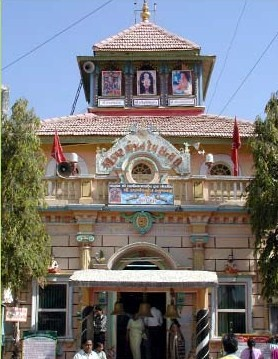
The temple complex before renovation

The idol of Shree Kashtabhanjandev was installed by Gopalanand Swami. Gopalanand Swami touched the murti with a rod and the murti came alive and moved. This story has become a charter for the healing ritual performed at this temple. The idol of Hanuman here is a stout figure with a handlebar moustache, with Shani Dev in his feminine form under his foot and baring his teeth, standing among sculpted foliage full of fruit bearing monkey attendants. The overall temple renovations were done many times by the Swaminarayan Sampradaya. In 1899, Kothari Gordhandas of Vadtal appointed Shastriji Maharaj (Shastri Yagnapurushdas), the founder of BAPS, to oversee the temple’s affairs. During his tenure, Shastriji Maharaj renovated the temple, constructed the adjacent bungalow, and acquired additional land to expand the complex, contributing significantly to its present form. Govardhandas then appointed a new mahant of the temple of Sarangpur. Since, then the Vadtal Gadi has constructed additional improvements and buildings to the temple. Hariprakash Swami is an incumbent trustee. Adjacent to the main temple is a dedicated mandir honoring Swaminarayan, which houses numerous sacred relics associated with his life and teachings. This mandir serves as a place of reverence and reflection for devotees, offering a unique glimpse into Swaminarayan’s legacy through carefully preserved items that are integral to the faith's history.

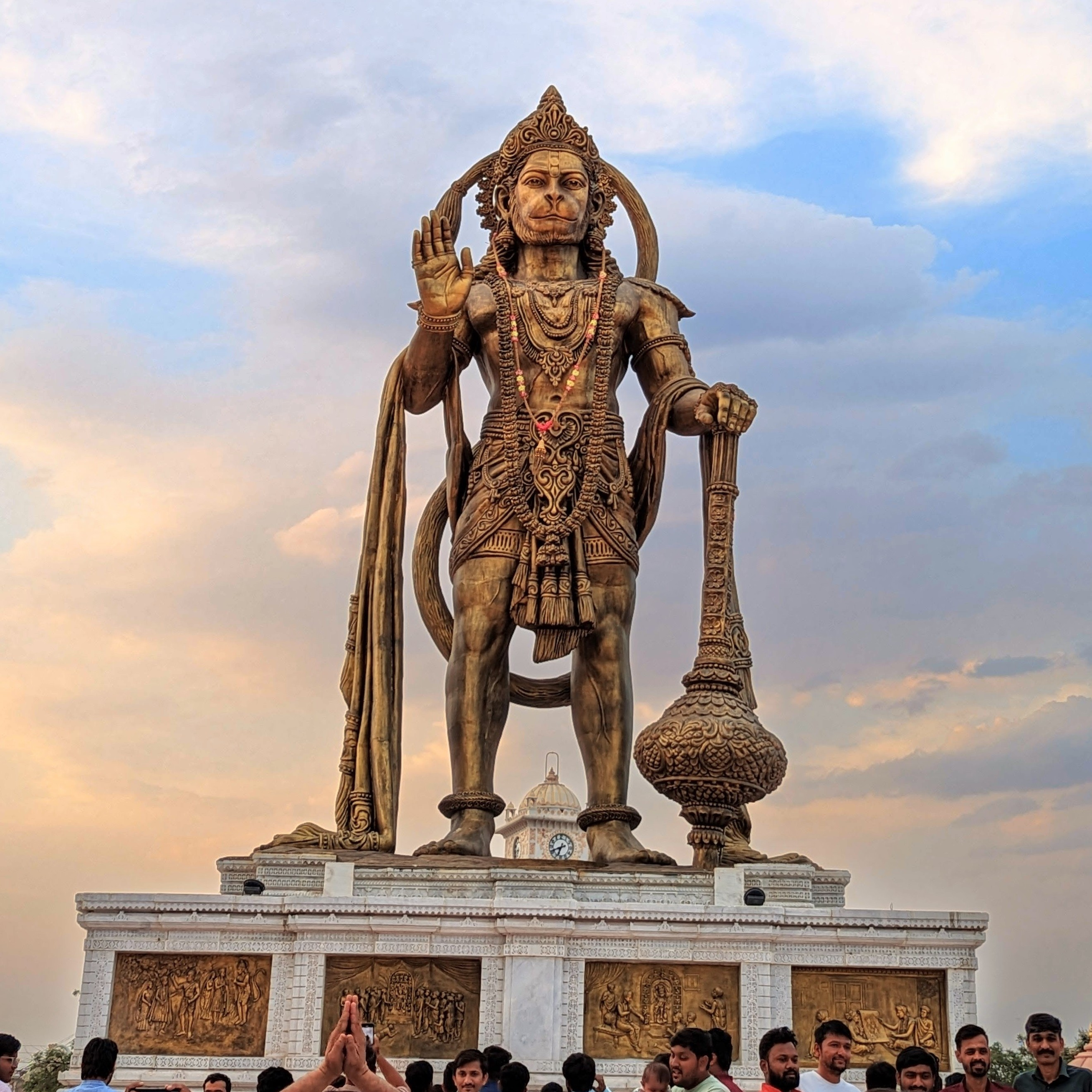
54-feet tall statue of Hanuman

On 6 April 2023, then Indian home minister Amit Shah unveiled 54-feet tall statue made out of metals which weighs 30,000 kg. The statue, visible from 7 km away, was crafted at the cost of ₹11 crore (₹110 million).

== Rituals ==
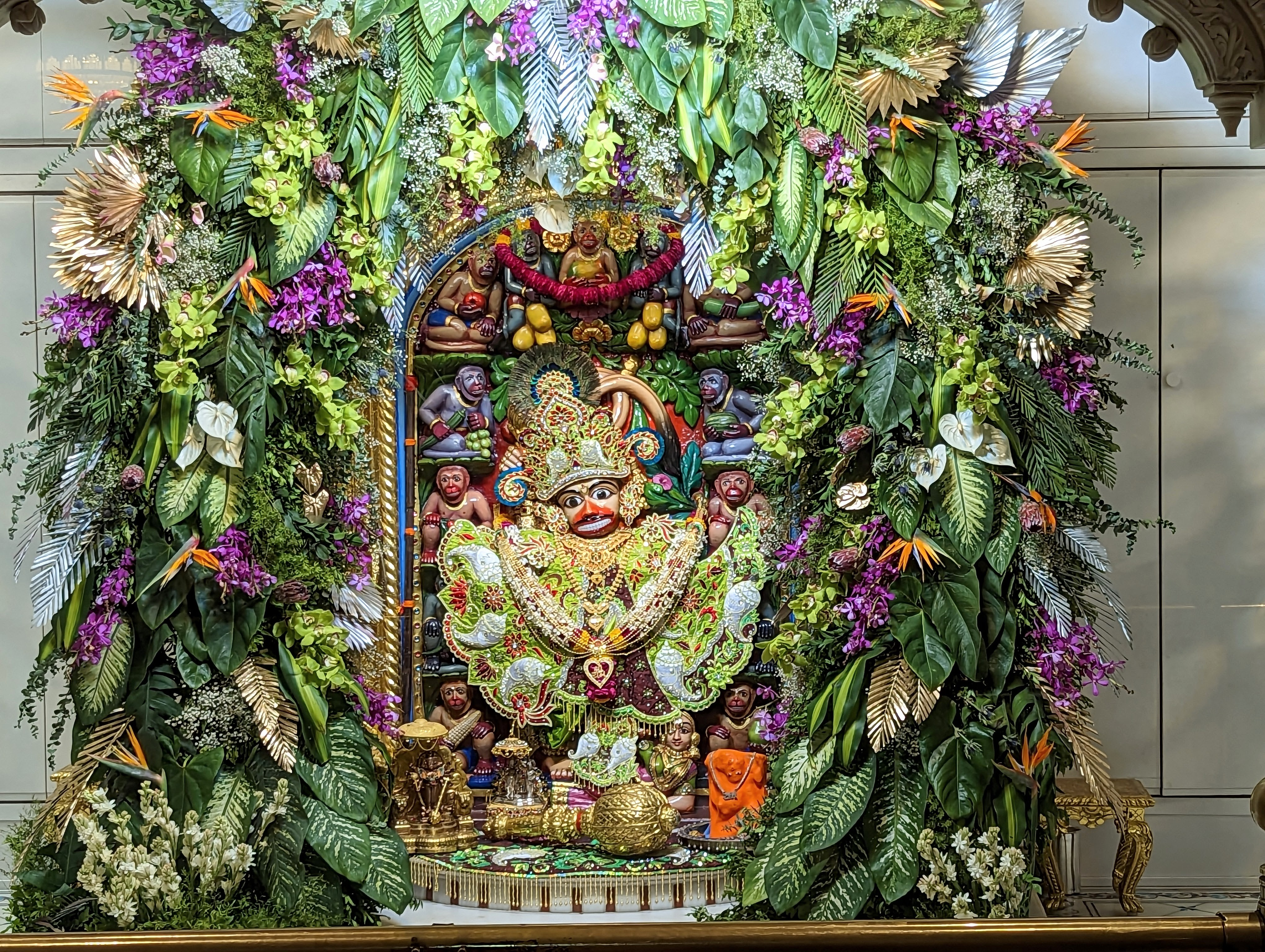

Entrance gate of temple

The image of this temple is said to be so powerful that a mere look at it will drive the evil spirits out of the people affected by them. Saturday is the designated day for a special ritual for those affected by mental illnesses and other disorders. The temple administration has hired a brahmin householder for puja and vidhi at the temple and conduct this ritual. After this, the person affected is instructed to circumambulate the shrine and repeat this after doing darshan a number of times.
