= Pagh =

Pagh is an ancient Danish surname, from old Danish. It means "palisade", and applies to the ancient nobility, Uradel. The family dominated over Odense whose old town arms was similar to the coat of arms of the family: a golden lily in a blue field. Notable people with the surname include:

- Klaus Pagh (1935–2020), Danish actor, film producer, and director
- Mads Pagh Bruun (1809–1884), Danish politician
- Poul Pagh (1796–1870), Danish merchant and shipowner
- Rasmus Pagh, Danish computer scientist

In Denmark there are 770 people with the surname Pagh
