= Premanand Swami =

Hindu saint and poet of the Swaminarayan Sampradaya

Premanand Swami (1784–1854) was a prominent saint, poet, and musician of the Swaminarayan Sampradaya and one of Swaminarayan's most celebrated paramhansas. Known for his devotional poetry and musical compositions, Premanand Swami played a significant role in shaping the literary and musical traditions of the Swaminarayan movement.

== Early life and initiation ==
Born in 1784 (Samvat 1840) into a Sathodara Nagar Brahmin family near Nadiad, Gujarat, Premanand Swami's early life was marked by adversity. Abandoned as an infant due to social pressures, he was adopted and raised by a Muslim couple. At the age of eleven, he encountered Swaminarayan during a procession in Jetpur, an event that profoundly influenced his future path.

Following Swaminarayan's guidance, he studied music in Ujjain before returning to join the Swaminarayan fold. He was initiated as a sadhu by Swaminarayan around 1814 CE (Samvat 1870), initially named Nijbodhanand Swami, later changed to Premanand Swami.

== Literary and musical contributions ==
Premanand Swami was renowned for his prolific output of devotional poetry and music. He composed over 4,000 devotional songs (kirtans) in Gujarati, Hindi, and Vraj languages. His most famous composition, the Chesta Pad, which describes Swaminarayan's daily routine, is still recited daily in Swaminarayan temples worldwide.

His major works include:

- Dhyan Manjari
- Narayan Charitra
- Tulsi Vivah
- Gopi Virah
- Shriharicharitra

Premanand Swami's Drupad verses are considered particularly noteworthy in Indian classical music.

== Relationship with Swaminarayan ==
Swaminarayan held Premanand Swami in high regard, often praising his devotion and poetic talents. He referred to Premanand Swami as "Premsakhi" (friend of love) due to his intense devotion. Premanand Swami's compositions frequently described Swaminarayan as the manifest form of Purushottam (supreme God), reflecting his deep spiritual understanding and devotion.

== Legacy ==
Premanand Swami died on 21 November 1854 (Magshar sud 1, Samvat 1911) in Gadhada. His contributions to the Swaminarayan Sampradaya, particularly in the realms of devotional poetry and music, continue to be celebrated. Many of his compositions remain an integral part of daily worship and festivals in Swaminarayan temples.
