= St. Xavier's High School, Mirzapur =

St. Xavier's High School

Location
- Ahmedabad, Gujarat; India; 23.0308°N 72.5843°E

Information
- Type: Independent co-educational primary and secondary (1-10); co-educational higher secondary (11th and 12th grade)
- Motto: A Teneris Impende Laborem; Apply yourself to hardwork from an early age
- Established: 1935; 91 years ago
- Chairman: Bishop Thomas Ignatius Macwan
- Principal: Fr. Titus De Costa
- Faculty: 180
- Grades: 1–12
- Classes: 36
- Campus: 12 acres (49,000 m^{2})
- Affiliations: Roman Catholic, Jesuit

St. Xavier's High School, Mirzapur, India is an English and Gujarati medium primary and secondary school administered by the Jesuits in Ahmedabad, Gujarat. It was established in 1935.

== History ==
The Sisters of Mount Carmel founded the school in a few rooms to the right of the present compound. They ran it for a year before handing it over to the Society of Jesus. For need of more space St. Xavier's High School Loyola Hall across the Sabarmati River was opened, and in 1975 become a separate school, eight kilometers away. Plans for a third Xavier high school in Ahmedabad began in 2009, and it was graduating students by 2012.

St. Xavier's is managed by the Xavier Education Society and prepares students for the Secondary and Higher Secondary School Certificate Examination. It includes kindergarten through 12th standard (science and commerce), with parallel classes taught in Gujarati and in English.

Among its sports facilities are a taekwondo center opened in 2016. Yoga was introduced in 2016.

An alumni association, Xaviers Alumni Mirzapur (XAM), was founded in 2014.

In 2014 it began sponsoring a Christmas Carnival that was widely attended, including the mayor, bishop, swami, and cultural groups like the Adivasi dancers.

In 2010 a student from the school ranked 10th in Gujarat state in the science exam for class XII.

== Images ==
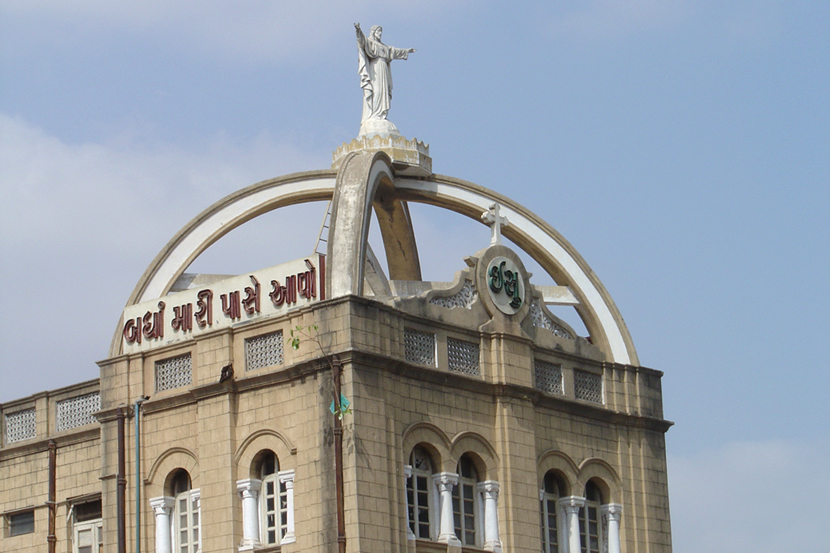
School dome

Bird's-eye view

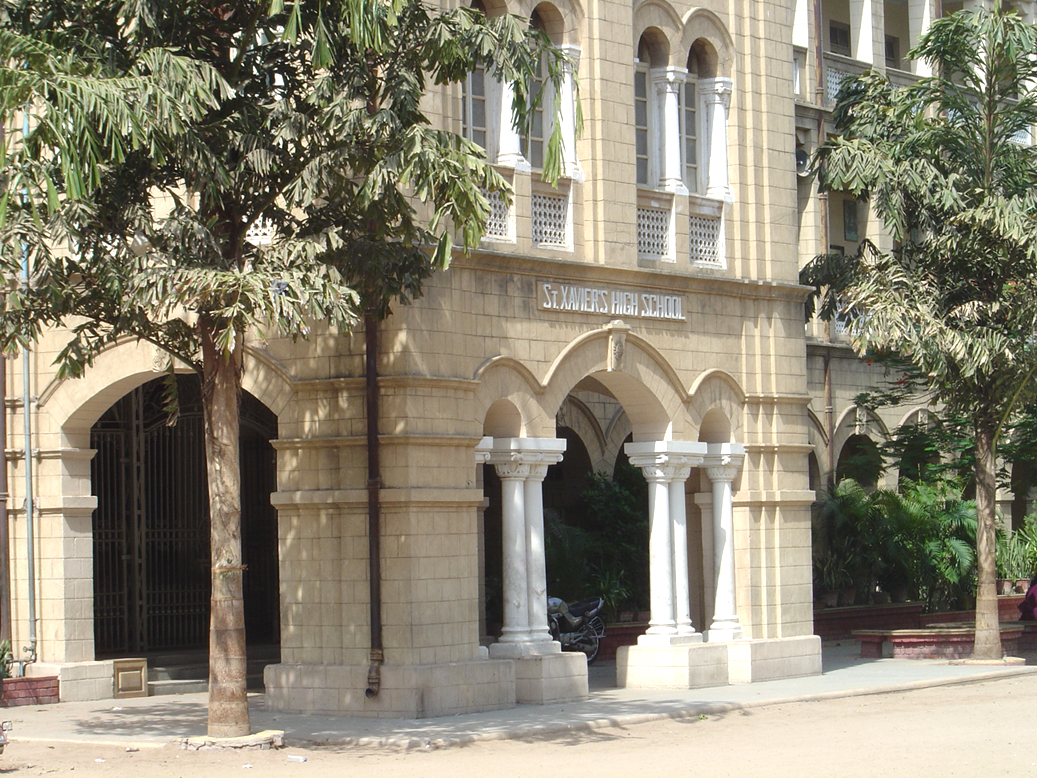
Entrance

== See also ==
- List of Jesuit sites
- List of schools named after Francis Xavier
