= Satsangi Jivan =

Authorized biography of Swaminarayan

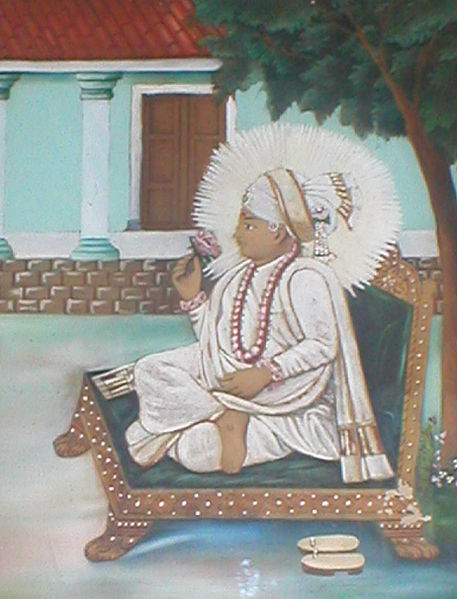
Swaminarayan

Satsangi Jivan is the authorised biography of Swaminarayan. The book contains information on the life and teachings of Swaminarayan. It is written by Shatanand Swami and completed in 1829.Swaminarayan decided to make Gadhada his permanent residence on the insistence of Dada Khachar and his sisters. Upon completion of the Shri Swaminarayan Mandir, Gadhada in 1828, Swaminarayan instructed Shatanand Swami to write a book on his life and pastimes.

== Book ==
Satsangi Jivan comprises 19,387 shlokas among 360 chapters, in 5 volumes.

To enable Shatanand swami to write from His childhood, Swaminarayan had blessed Shatanand Swami with Sanjay Drishti—special power to see the entire past right from His childhood.

Once written by Shatanand Swami, this book was verified and authenticated by Swaminarayan. He was much pleased to read the book. Swaminarayan then asked his disciples to do Katha of Satsangi Jivan.

Volume 1 narrates the prologue and the circumstances leading to Swaminarayan taking birth. This volume then goes on to speak of His childhood, His journey across India as a teenager and the meeting of Swaminarayan (then known as Neelkanth Varni) with his guru, Ramanand Swami. The volume ends with Swaminarayan being appointed head of the Swaminarayan Sampraday.

In volume 2, Shatanand Swami describes Swaminarayan’s social upliftment of the masses, spiritual / religious / social guidance for their personal well being and visiting followers whilst moving through villages, towns & cities.

Volume 3 continues the narrations of Swaminarayan’s movements to teach the depths of Devotion with true observance of Dharma. It is in this volume that the construction of temples by Swaminarayan is first talked about.

Volume 4 commences with narrations of the scriptural recitals that Swaminarayan instructed. However, this volume is primarily revered for its intricate explanation of the Shikshapatri, the establishing of the Acharyaship and teachings specifically to the Acharyas.

Volume 5 is dedicated to personal religious activities of Swaminarayan in minute detail.

== Meaning of Satsang ==
In Satsangi Jivan, Shatanand Swami mentions that merging the two terms, the meaning of Satsang is derived. The term Sat implies four significances:

1. God

2. Saints who has entirely surrendered to God

3. Dharma asserted by God Himself and his favorite saints, and

4. The Scriptures wherein these three above mentioned are prescribed.

In Vachanamrut, Swaminarayan commented on the term "sang". The association which is made by body, action, and mind is called "sang". When you put the two together you get Satsang. Jivan means life, therefore the meaning of the title, Satsangi Jivan is way of life for a Satsangi.
