= Swaminarayan Temple, Ahmedabad =

Shree Swaminarayan Mandir Kalupur Ahmedabad
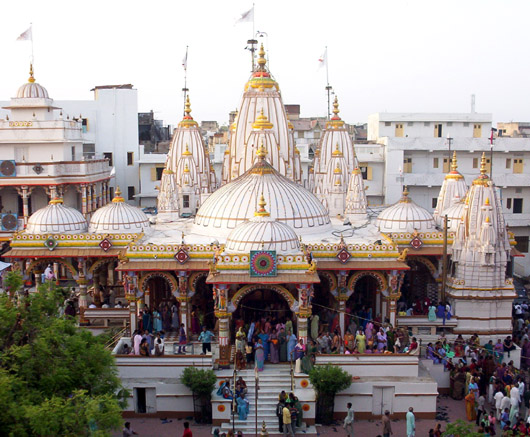
- The headquarters of the NarNarayan Dev Gadi

- Location in Ahmedabad, Gujarat Swaminarayan Temple, Ahmedabad (Gujarat)

Religion
- Affiliation: Hinduism
- Deity: Nar Narayan; Radha Krishna
- Festivals: Janmashtami, Radhashtami, Holi, Diwali

Location
- Location: Ahmedabad
- State: Gujarat
- Country: India
- Interactive map of Shree Swaminarayan Mandir Kalupur Ahmedabad
- Coordinates: 23.030°N 72.591°E

Architecture
- Creator: Shree Swaminarayan Mandir Kalupur
- Established: Vikram Samvata 1876 (1819)
- Completed: 24 February 1822

Website
- Official website

Shree Swaminarayan Mandir Kalupur (Gujarati: શ્રી સ્વામિનારાયણ મંદિર, અમદાવાદ, Devnagari: श्री स्वामिनारायण मन्दिर, अहमदाबाद) is the first Temple of the Swaminarayan Sampraday, a Hindu sect. It is located in Kalupur area of Ahmedabad, the largest city in Gujarat, India. It was built on the instructions of Swaminarayan, the founder of the sect.

As per the will of Swaminarayan, the administration of the Swaminarayan Sampraday is divided into two Gadis (seats) - NarNarayan Dev Gadi and LaxmiNarayan Dev Gadi. This Temple is the headquarters of the NarNarayan Dev Gadi.

== History ==
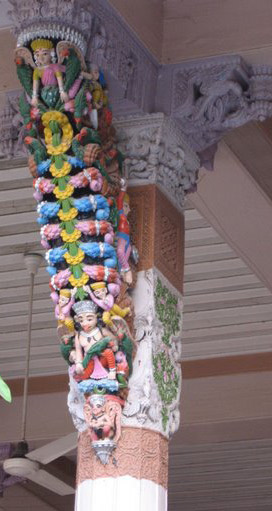
Sculptured wooden pillar

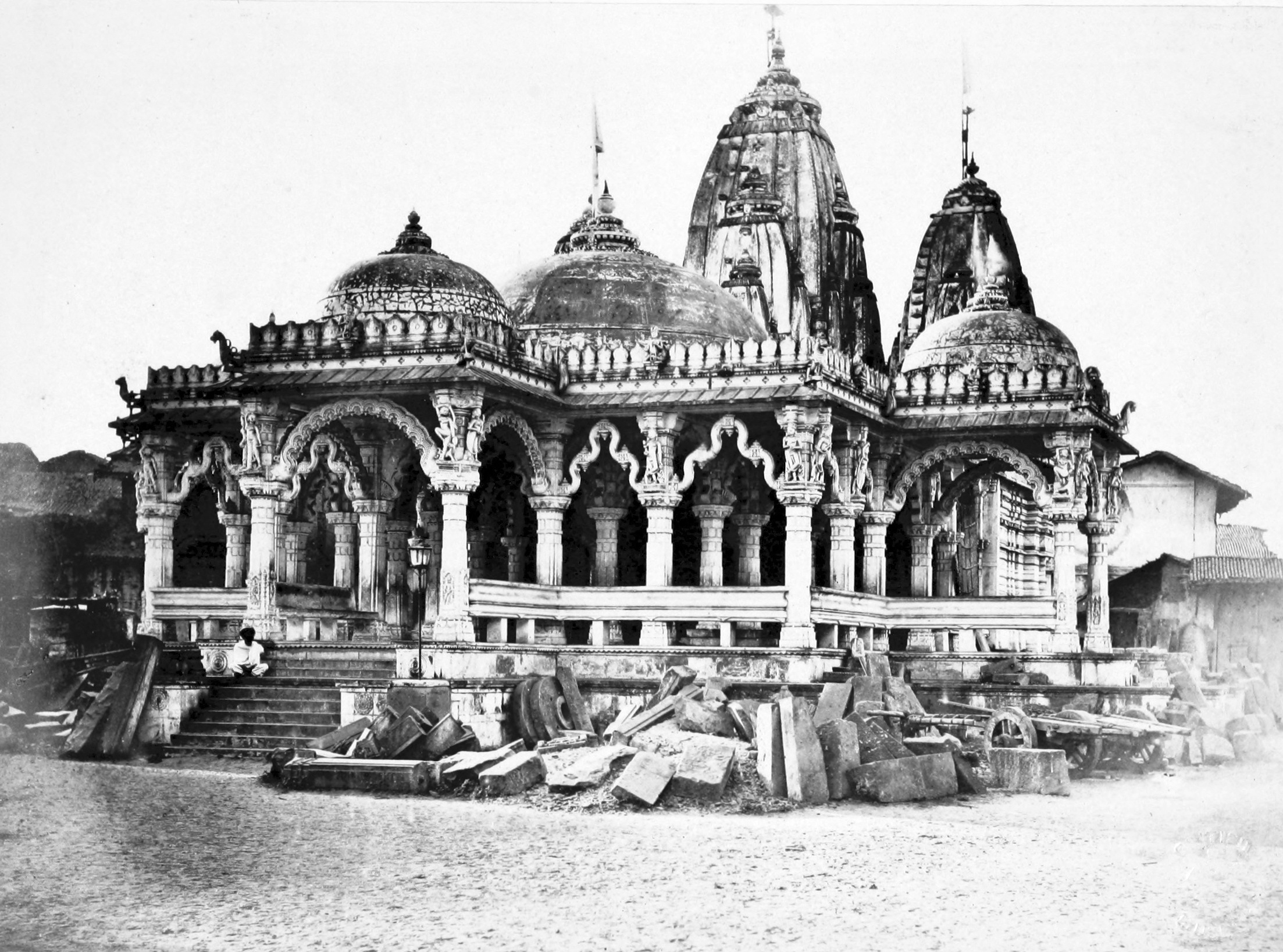
The temple in 1866

According to the Swaminarayan source, the Shri Hari Charitramrut Sagar, in 1817, a British official serving under John Andrew Dunlop, the first British collector of Ahmedabad, named "Eron Saheb" invited Swaminarayan to meet with him and promised land for a residence in Ahmedabad. Eron Saheb further communicated with Swaminarayan's followers, namely Kubersinh, to construct a residence hall for Swaminarayan, his sadhus, and followers to stay. In 1819, Eron Saheb and Swaminarayan met again and Eron Saheb promised to grant a plot of land in Kalupur for Swaminarayan to build a mandir. Swaminarayan met with Eron Saheb to discuss the land and also revealed that Dunlop would be stationed in Ahmedabad as the collector and that he was being moved to Surat.

John Andrew Dunlop was employed by the British East India Company as a British collector in India in 1806. Prior to his appointment in Ahmedabad, he served as a collector of Kheda (Kaira), magistrate and collector of Western Zillah, and collector of Southern Concan. After the British East India Company took control over Ahmedabad on 20 November 1817, Dunlop became its first collector in February 1818.

Dunlop and other British officials received approval from England, granting Swaminarayan land to build the mandir. After receiving approval, Dunlop sent a letter to Swaminarayan that said, "Respected Shri Sahajanandji Maharaj, Salaams from Dunlop Sahib. Have received order from abroad of transfer for the land selected by you. Shall come to you to read it as it is in English at your earliest convenience… Later will have it etched in copper."

Swaminarayan assigned Anandanand Swami, one of his disciples, to lead the construction of the mandir. On 24 February 1822, Swaminarayan inaugurated the mandir in the presence of 50,000 people.

== Architecture ==
According to Anjali Desai, author of India Guide Gujarat, the temple resembles a fairytale with all its colours and opulent carvings that profusely embellish every wooden bracket, column and arch. The temple has a multi-story guesthouse that is air conditioned and has a fully equipped medical clinic within its compound.

=== The North Gateway ===
The central gateway of the temple is artistic. It blends local, regional and British styles of architecture and sculpture. Marathi and Rajasthani folk cultures and costumes are evident on the gateway sculptors. The columns are engraved with vertical lining in Corinthian order. The top of the projected pavilions are ruminants of Mughal architecture. Statues of the women wearing frilled blouses and petticoats, carrying their kids on their waist depict the Gujarati women.

=== Nar Narayan Temple ===
This is the heart of the temple complex. The temple was constructed as per scriptural norms with intricate carving in pure Burma-teak and constructed with sculptural art by depicting deities' episodes, auspicious symbols and religious icons representing axiomatic religion and Indian culture. The temple is believed to be a valuable cultural heritage in the socio-religious history of Gujarat and India. The images in this temple are of Narnarayan Dev in the centre, Radhakrishna Dev on the right, Dharmadev, BhaktiMata and Harikrishna on the left of the central hall. The images were made in Dungarpur and stone came from quarries in Himmatnagar and Dhrangadhra. The temple is also known for the attractive dresses that drape the deities. Dresses for the central Narnarayan as well as RadhaKrishna images are changed seven times a day and are never repeated.

=== Akshar Bhavan ===
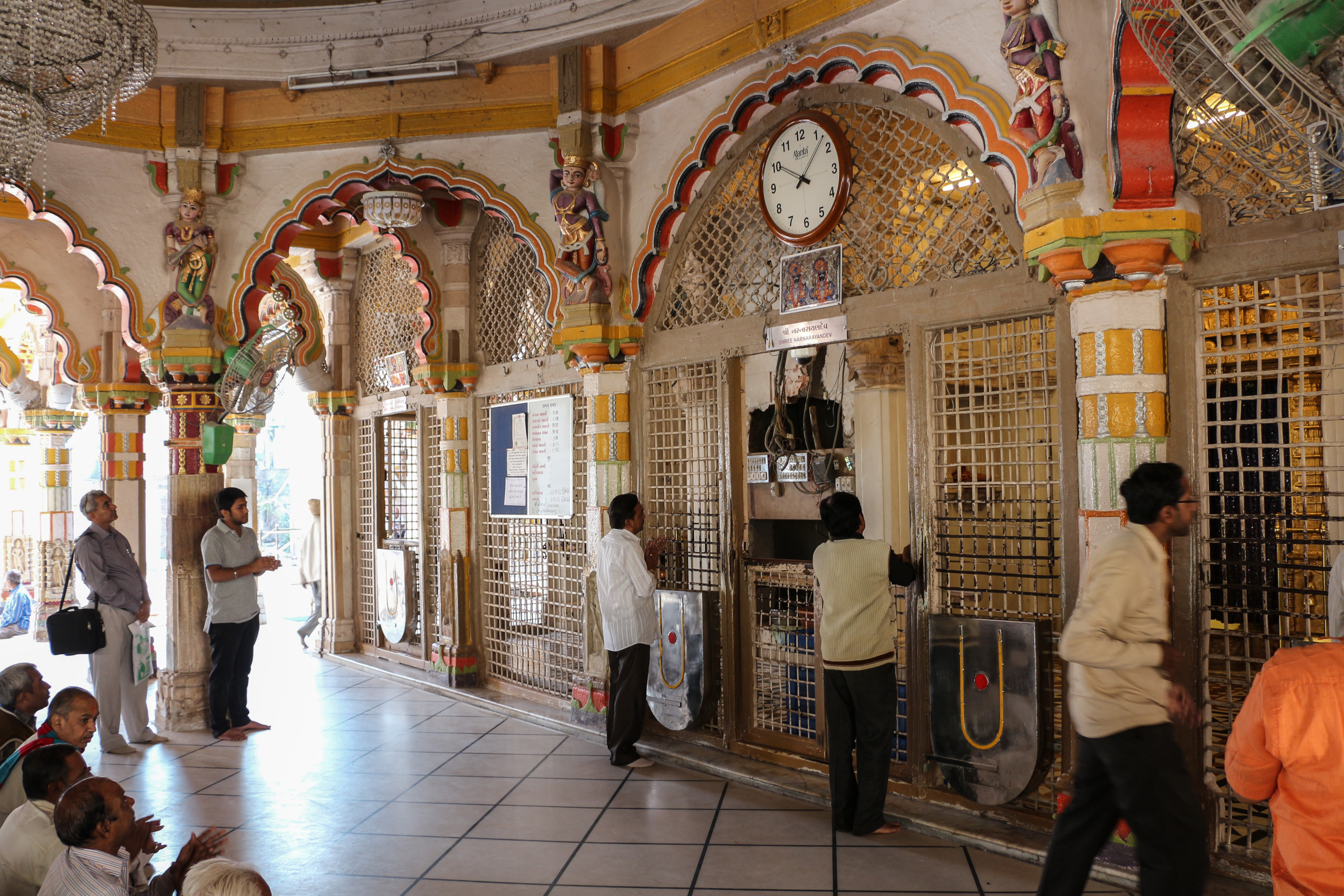
Inside the temple

Besides the gods in the main temple, an idol in the form of a child, Ghanshyam Maharaj in white marble has been installed on the ground floor. Personal items of Swaminarayan have been displayed for viewing by the visitors on the ground as well as first floor. The southern side of this building is known as Tejendra Bhuvan and houses visiting pilgrims.

=== Rang Mahol ===
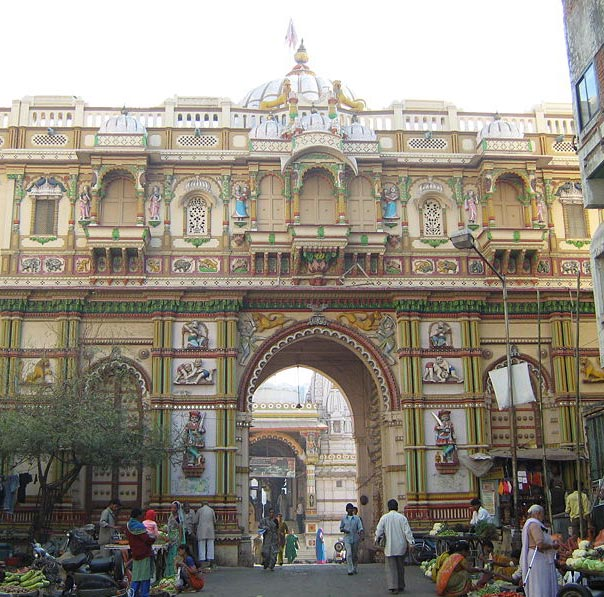
The Gateway

An idol of Ghanshyam Maharaj has been installed in a place called the Rang Mahol in the temple where Swaminarayan stayed during his visits to Ahmedabad. A wood carved life-size idol of Swaminarayan in standing sambhang position, was installed here fifty nine years after the construction of the temple. It is one of the finest specimens of wooden art sculpting in Gujarat.

=== Temple for women (West) ===
The Haveli (Mansion) to the west of the temple used to be the official residence of Acharya of the Narnarayan Dev Gadi. Now, the ground floor of the front side, houses the offices and the inner portion accommodates the residency of the Sankhya Yogi women (ladies who have taken celibacy vows and devoted their life to the temple). In the inner temple, the Gadiwalla (the Acharya's wife & spiritual leader of the women in the Swaminarayan Sampraday) holds religious assemblies solely for the benefit of the women. An idol of Ghanshyam Maharaj has been installed in this temple and is served by the Sankhya Yogi women devotees.

This mansion is decorated with chandeliers, suspended lamps and large mirrors as it was supposed to be the residence of the Acharya. The brackets of the pillars in the portico as well as arches have been adorned with carvings in geometrical designs and a variety of flower and creeper motifs.

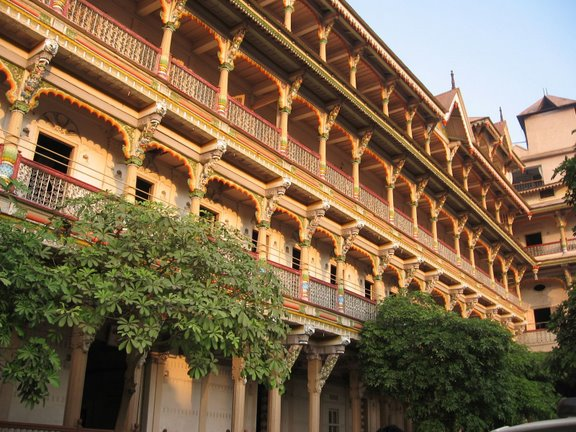
The wood sculptured haveli

=== Haveli (North) ===
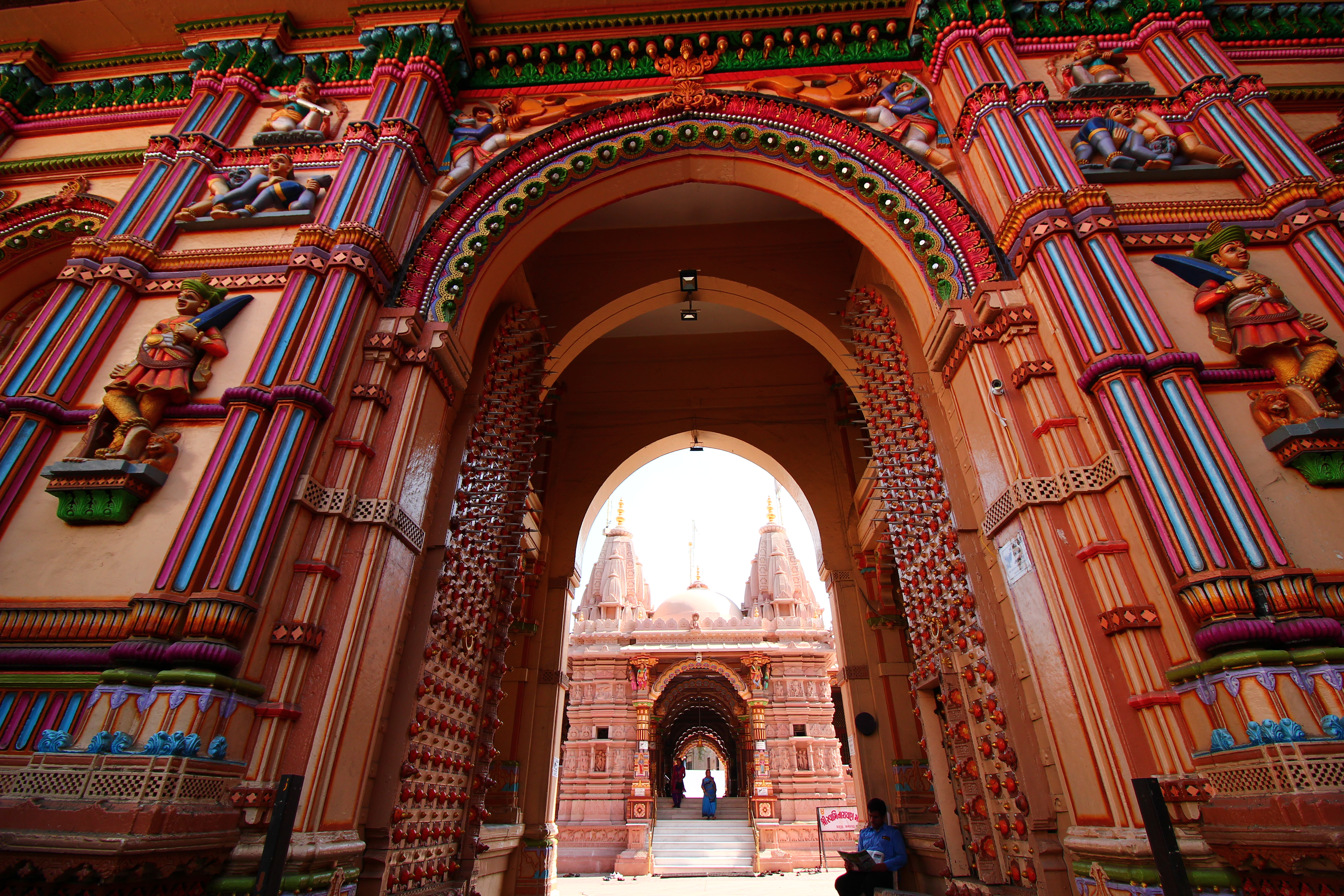
Temple Gate

This three-storey mansion was constructed by Acharya Keshavprasad Maharaj in 1871.

The mansion itself rests on octagonal and square wooden pillars on which Ardh-murt relief sculpture of flowers and creepers is engraved. Angles of wooden pillars, carved in free hand design and the shapely Bharnai, which balconies rest on. The Sabha mandap, an extensive Central Hall, has been constructed on sixty pillars. There are giant size madal-shilp sculptures on twelve high pillars in the front row on which rest the portico of the first floor, capture our attention with its great artistic appeal. These sculptors include a flying Hanuman lifting the Devgiri mountain in his palm; a pot bellied Ghanesha wearing a scarlet turban in the South Indian style, miniature sculptures of several soldiers armed and dressed in Marathi turbans and costumes and herds of monkeys have been created on the religious tradition in the wooden sculptors. Some sculptors depict the 1857 uprising, with the Rani of Jhansi and other heroes narrated in carvings of these pillars. There are a total of 12 such pillars, which depict scenes such as a Maratha warrior fighting under the Rani of Jhansi in guise of Durga the Hindu goddess, Indian leader Tatya Tope in the guise of Narsimha, the lion headed form of Vishnu and that of parrots which tell the mood of the times.

Sculptures of lions and elephants, birds like peacocks and parrots and perfectly engraved leaves and flowers decorate the panels. The beams, ceilings, and lower sections are adorned with engravings, artistic sculptures and free-hand designs. In this mansion, Acharya sits on the wooden seat once used by Swaminarayan in the Congregation Hall. A new residence of the saints, Vrajendraprasad Mahal and a dining hall for the devotees are also situated in this mansion.

=== Haveli (East) ===
This mansion is two storeyed. Sculptures of animal heads, flowers and creepers are carved on the wooden pillars of the portico on the ground floor. Items relating to NarNarayan Dev on the ground floor. The first and second floors house a Sanskrit and music school as well as residence for saints. The backyard hosts the residence for brahmchari (celibate) students. A well where Swaminarayan used to bathe under a dome is also part of the backyard.

== Secular area and Heritage Walk ==
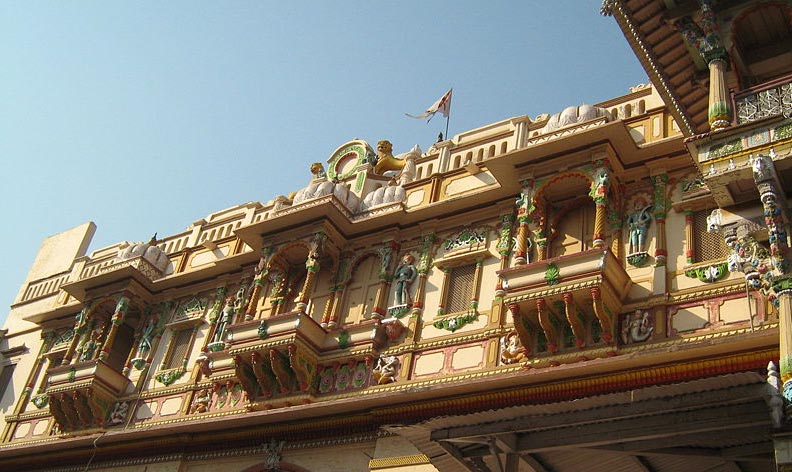
Picture of ornate wall carvings taken during the heritage walk

Kalupur area in Ahmedabad where the temple is located in a Muslim dominated area. Communal harmony was shown during the 2001 Gujarat earthquake when the Muslim neighbours cooked food and gave it to the temple authorities, who accepted it as they needed it to distribute to earthquake victims.

A Heritage Walk of Ahmedabad city was started on 19 November 1997 by the local municipal corporation in association with the Foundation for Conservation and Research of Urban Traditional Architecture (CRUTA). The walk starts from this temple in the Kalupur area of the city and ends at the Jama Masjid, after touring 18 sites. The one and a half kilometer long walk takes three hours to complete. In 1999, the temple held an exhibition of photographs relating to the culture and architecture of the city as part of the Heritage Week celebrations. In 2003, Chief Minister of Gujarat, Narendra Modi, chose to lead this walk along with his cabinet colleagues to spread the message of peace.

== See also ==
- Swaminarayan
- Swaminarayan Faith
- Swaminarayan Temples
