= Ayodhyaprasad =

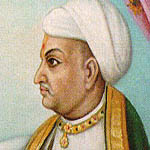
Ayodhyaprasadji

Ayodyaprasadji (25 May 1809 – 18 February 1868), known to devotees as "Sanatan Dharma Dhurandar Acharya Maharaj Shree 1008 Ayodyaprasadji Maharaj", was the first acharya of the north diocese (NarNarayan Dev Gadi) of the Swaminarayan Sampraday sect of Hinduism. He was the son of Rampratapji, Swaminarayan's elder brother. He was the 1st successor of Swaminarayan in the North Diocese, Ahmedabad). He was enthroned as Acharya on 10 November 1826 and held the post till his death.

The bicentennial of his birth was celebrated as the Dharmakul Vandana Mahotsav in Ahmedabad from 1 to 3 June 2009. The event was attended by an estimated 600,000 people.
