= Shikshapatri =

Religious text written by Swaminarayan

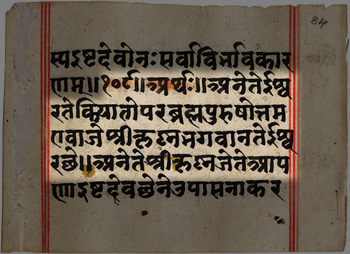
- verse of the Shikshapatri

Information
- Religion: Hinduism (Swaminarayan Sampradaya)
- Author: Swaminarayan
- Language: Classical Sanskrit
- Period: c. 1826

The (Gujarati: શિક્ષાપત્રી, Devanagari: शिक्षापत्री) is a religious text consisting of two hundred and twelve verses, written in by Swaminarayan in about 1826 The original text is no longer available, but was translated into Sanskrit by Sahajanand Swami, who incorporated into and compiled the scripture known as Satsangi Jivan. Further translations have been made into a number of other languages.

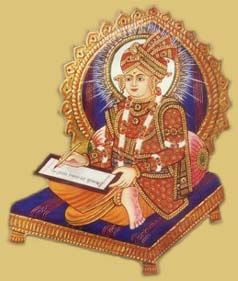
An illustration of Swaminarayan writing the Shiskhapatri

On 26 February 1830, at Rajkot, Swaminarayan presented a copy of the Shikshapatri to Sir John Malcolm, the Governor of Bombay. This copy is now housed at the Bodleian Library of the University of Oxford.
