= Satsangi =

Follower of Swaminarayan

The followers of Swaminarayan, Radha Soami and other similar Sant Mat or Satsang movement is referred to as a Satsangi.

== Satsangi life ==
=== Kanthi ===
A kanthi is a double stranded necklace made of tulsi. Female satsangis are initiated by the wife of the acharya, who is the leader of women in the Swaminarayan Sampradaya. Female members of BAPS are generally initiated by senior women followers and males are initiated at the hands of a sadhu or senior male devotees.

== See also ==
- Swaminarayan
- Swaminarayan Sampradaya
