= Tyke =

Tyke may refer to:

- Tyke (character), an MGM cartoon character in the Tom and Jerry series and the older son of Spike
- Tyke (dialect), a British dialect spoken in the United Kingdom's county of Yorkshire
- Tyke (dog), a dog whose ancestry is generally unknown and that has characteristics of two or more types of breeds
- Tyke (elephant), a female circus elephant
- Tyke (given name), an American masculine given name
- Tyke (pigeon), a Second World War homing pigeon which was awarded the Dickin Medal for gallantry in 1943

== See also ==
- Leeds Tykes, a rugby union club
- The Tykes, a nickname for Barnsley F.C.
- Tykes Water, a stream that runs south from Aldenham Reservoir
