= Voices (1973 film) =

1973 British film by Kevin Billington

- Film poster
- Directed by: Kevin Billington
- Written by: George Kirgo; Robert Enders
- Based on: the play by Richard Lortz
- Produced by: Robert Enders
- Starring: David Hemmings; Gayle Hunnicutt
- Cinematography: Geoffrey Unsworth
- Edited by: Peter Thornton
- Music by: Richard Rodney Bennett
- Production company: Warden Productions
- Distributed by: Hemdale Film Corporation
- Release date: June 16, 1973
- Running time: 91 minutes
- Country: United Kingdom
- Language: English

Voices is a 1973 British psychological drama thriller film directed by Kevin Billington and starring David Hemmings and Gayle Hunnicutt. It is based on the play of the same name by Richard Lortz.

== Plot ==
The idyllic existence of young couple Robert and Claire Williams is turned upside down when their 6-year-old son David dies accidentally by drowning while they were making love in their boat.

Through a series of flashbacks it is shown that Claire was deeply traumatized by the loss of David and after numerous suicide attempts due to her mental breakdown, she was finally hospitalized in a mental hospital. Her husband Robert had been trying to cope with the stress as well but it is apparent that the situation had become increasingly difficult for them both. After Claire gets released from the hospital, with the hope of Claire's full recovery, the couple plan a trip to the countryside where they can relax in the Georgian home, a secluded large manor which was left to Claire by her recently deceased aunt.

Their trip gets hindered due to the foggy weather. The fog is so thick that Robert avoids ramming into an oncoming car and hits a tree. When they finally reach the ancient mansion, it seems like the perfect setting for the couple to rekindle their romance but things disintegrate quickly. The situation reaches a breaking point after Claire begins hearing strange unidentifiable voices in the house.

Eventually the voices take shape and Claire comes face to face with the ghostly figure of a young girl Jessica playing with a toy ball who doesn't seem aware of the couple's presence. But she isn't the only ghost haunting the old house. Her mother and brother are also present. Claire desperately tries to convince Robert that she had indeed seen the ghosts but he refuses to do so. However, later both Claire and her husband Robert experience a series of unexplained supernatural events that leave them questioning their sanity as well as their very existence.

When the couple finally decide to leave the house and go back to their car, they find out that they are dead. Back when their car had crashed into the tree, they were actually killed meaning that ever since they've arrived at the house, they've been ghosts.

== Cast ==
- David Hemmings as Robert
- Gayle Hunnicutt as Claire
- Lynn Farleigh as the Mother
- Eva Griffiths as Jessica, the little girl
- Russell Lewis as John, the little boy
- Peggy Ann Clifford as the medium
- Adam Bridge as David, Robert and Claire's son

== Production ==
The film was shot on location in Hertfordshire, England and at EMI-MGM Elstree Studios. The final scene takes place by the bridge at Tykes Water at the Aldenham Reservoir.

== Music ==
The film's soundtrack was composed by Richard Rodney Bennett and conducted by Marcus Dods.

== Critical reception ==
The Monthly Film Bulletin wrote: "All the seams are showing in this calcified film-of-the-play, which sets a foredoomed young couple loose amidst the dust-covers of a crepitating old mansion and settles down to record ninety minutes of quaintly brittle dialogue which comes off the screen with all the snap and crackle of a bowl of soggy cereal. ... Someone has made a wan attempt to be inventive with the new medium by bleaching out the colour in the one main set and reducing the complexion of the actors to a whiter shade of putty (thereby hinting the ghostly twist of the ending). But the device merely manages to the film as unpleasant to watch as its ossified dialogue is to listen to,"
