= Watling Chase Timberland Trail =

Footpath in Hertfordshire, England

Coordinates: 51.693°N 0.286°W

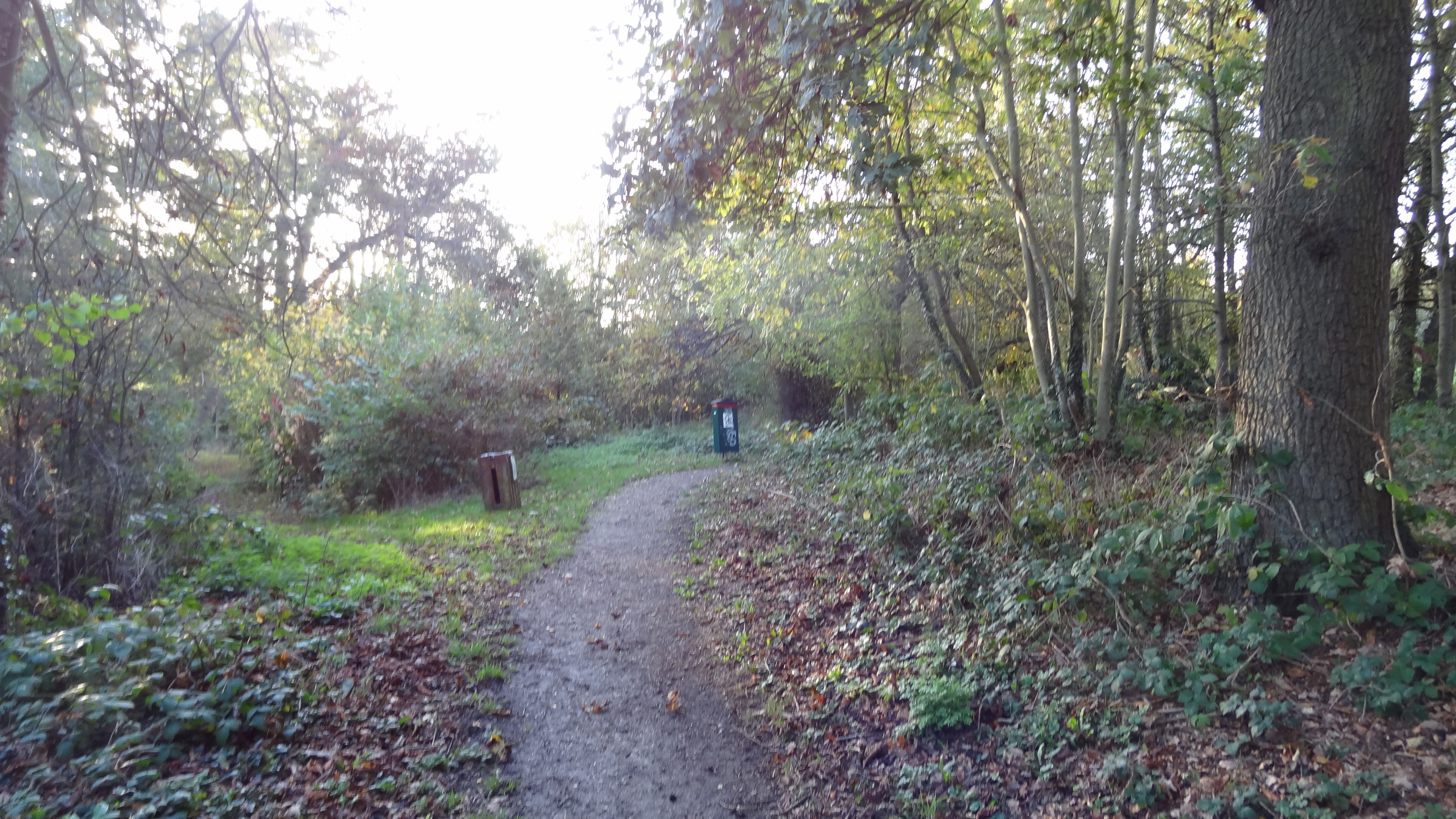
Watling Chase Timberland Trail in Shenley Park

The Watling Chase Timberland Trail is a 10.5 mile footpath in the Watling Chase Community Forest in Hertfordshire. It starts at Elstree & Borehamwood railway station, where it links with the London Loop, and goes mainly through farmland and parks. It passes through Shenley, London Colney and Colney Heath, finishing in Smallford near St Albans, where it links with the Alban Way.
