= Lower Colne =

Nature area in London

Coordinates: 51°29′05″N 0°29′44″W

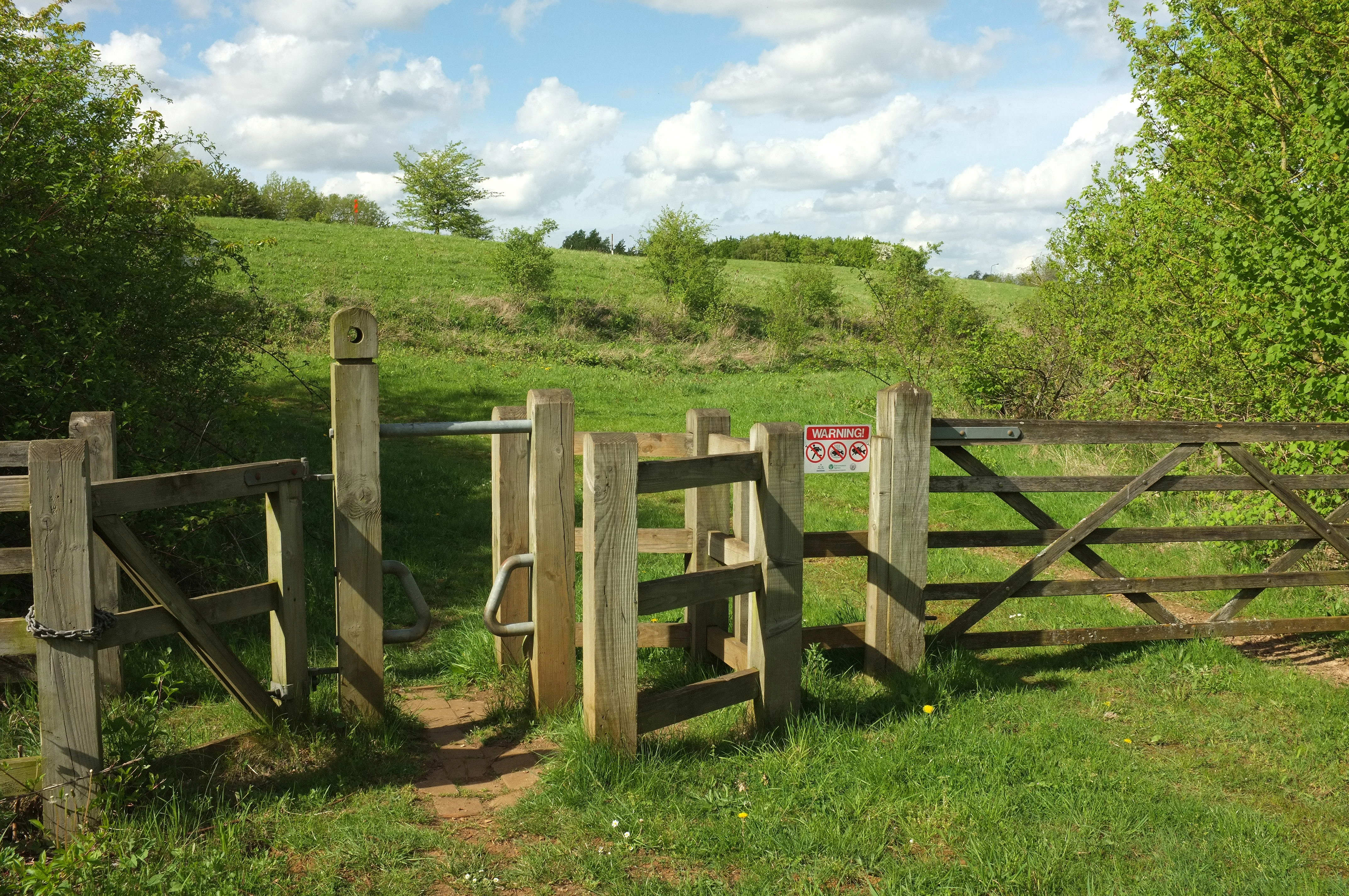
Harmondsworth Moor

Lower Colne is a Local Wildlife Site (reference M059) designated by London as a Metropolitan Site of Importance for Nature Conservation (SINC). It is located in the Borough of Hillingdon and follows the course of two rivers, the River Colne and the Wraysbury River. This Local Wildlife Site extends from grassland just north of the M4 motorway to grassland adjacent to the A3113 road and includes Harmondsworth Moor Country Park, Orchard Farm and Heathrow Colne Valley Biodiversity Sites.

The River Colne and the Wraysbury River originate as chalk streams and support aquatic plants including river water-dropwort, great yellow-cress, and pennyroyal. The site includes wet meadows, flooded gravel pits, and ponds, that provide habitat for kingfisher and water vole, while the rivers support a diversity of fish, including dace, chub and barbel.

This site is described in T. Farino and M. Game, Nature Conservation in Hillingdon, Ecology Handbook Number 7 (London Ecology Unit, 1988).

== Harmondsworth Moor Country Park ==
Harmondsworth Moor Country Park is a nature reserve owned by London Borough of Hillingdon that was established through habitat restoration in the year 2000 and has since been managed by British Airways Plc in partnership with Glendale Countryside. Prior to the year 2000 this land was used for gravel extraction and for landfill. Currently the site includes ponds lined by reed beds, meadows and there are patches of woodland where tree species include pedunculate oak. Along the rivers trees include crack willow. Orchid species recorded near Saxon Lake include pyramidal orchid and bee orchid. River water dropwort has been recorded in Wraysbury River in this country park. Lichen species in this park include Flavoparmelia soredians, Flavoparmelia caperata and Physcia adscendens.

== Orchard Farm ==
Orchard Farm is a small fenced area of wet grassland adjacent to the River Colne that includes a plot of land that was moved from the site where Heathrow Terminal 5 was constructed to preserve rare species present, including water avens. Currently plant species recorded there include Silaum silaus and Stellaria palustris. Grass snake has been recorded at this site.

== Heathrow Colne Valley Biodiversity Sites ==
Either side of the spur motorway between the M25 junction 14 and Heathrow Terminal 5 are meadows created by habitat restoration on spoil from the construction of Heathrow Terminal 5. Ranunculus sceleratus has been recorded here. Such Heathrow biodiversity sites have won awards for their management.
