= Watling Chase Community Forest =

Forest in London and Hertfordshire, England

Coordinates: 51.694°N 0.284°W

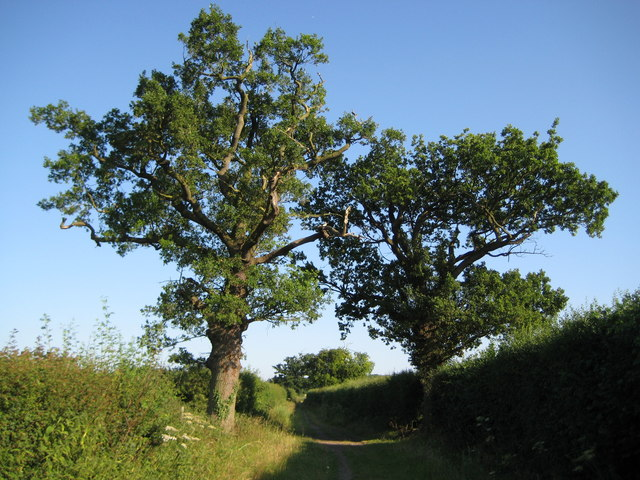
Watling Chase Timberland Trail in Shenley

Watling Chase Community Forest is an area of 72 square miles located in north London and south Hertfordshire around the towns of Potters Bar, Radlett, Borehamwood and Barnet. It includes Aldenham Country Park, Scratchwood, Moat Mount Open Space and the Watling Chase Timberland Trail, a waymarked walk of 16 kilometres.

It was set up in 1991 and is one of twelve community forests in England set up to regenerate the countryside in and around urban areas. They are sponsored by Natural England and the Forestry Commission which work with local authorities and voluntary bodies to manage them.

== See also ==
- Community forests in England
