= Meadow Park (Borehamwood) =

Football ground in Hertfordshire, England

Coordinates: 51.6619°N 0.2721°W

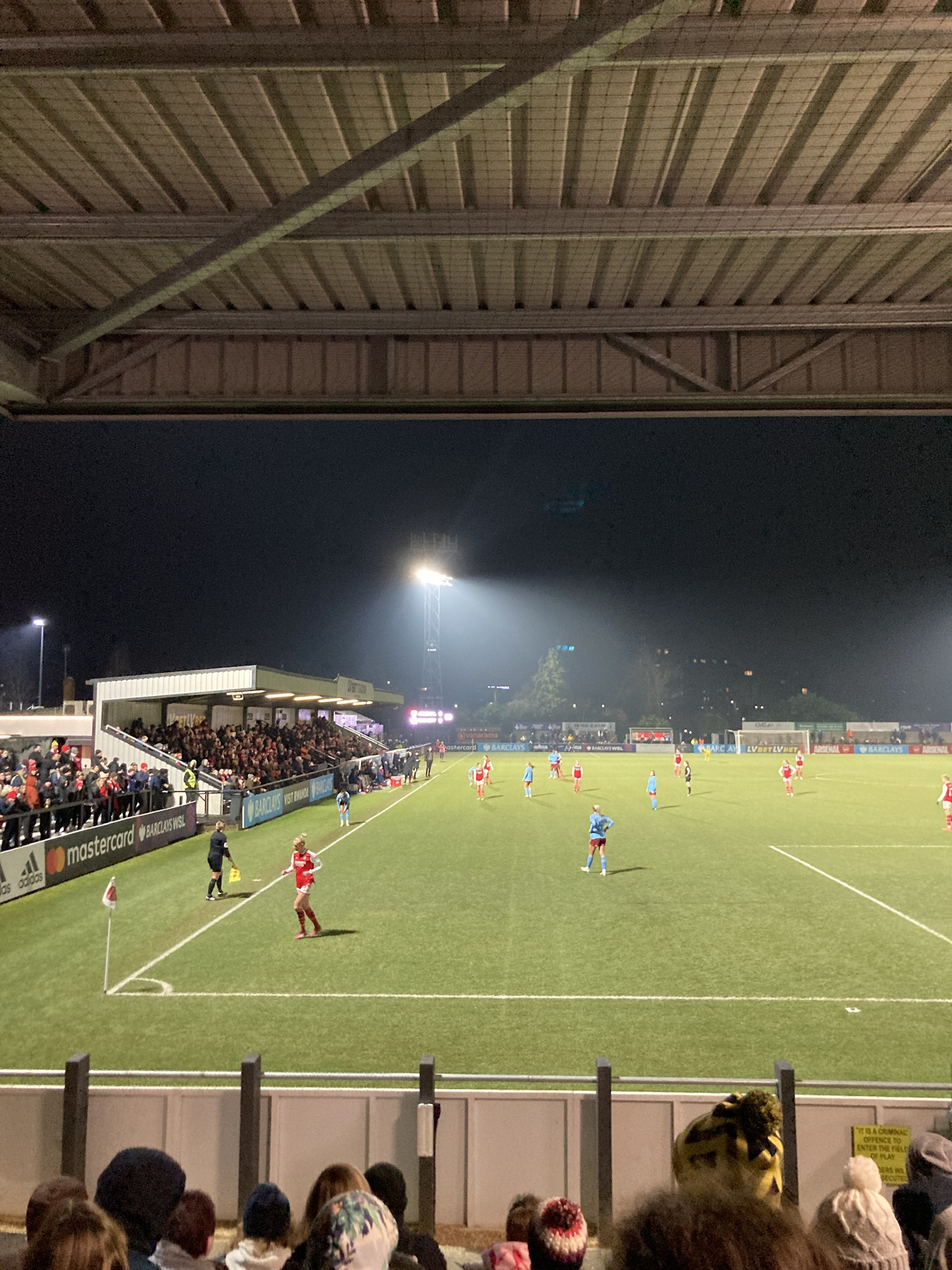
- Arsenal Women playing in 2023
- Interactive map of Meadow Park
- Address: Broughinge Road; Borehamwood, Hertfordshire; WD6 5AL
- Owner: Boreham Wood F.C. (stadium); Hertsmere Borough Council (land)
- Capacity: 4,500 (1,700 seated)
- Record attendance: 4,101 - Boreham Wood v St Albans City (FA Cup second round, 6 December 2021)
- Field size: 110 by 77 yards (100.6 m × 70.4 m)
- Public transit: Elstree & Borehamwood

Construction
- Opened: 1963

Tenants
- Boreham Wood (1963–present); Arsenal Women (1998–present); Arsenal Youth (2013–present)

Meadow Park, currently known as the Mangata Developments Stadium Meadow Park for sponsorship reasons, is a football ground in Borehamwood, Hertfordshire, England which serves as the home ground of Boreham Wood Football Club. It also hosts Arsenal's youth teams and select women's team matches.

Meadow Park is also the name of the public park which includes the football ground, as well as children's play areas, tennis courts, multi-sports courts, interactive play, a teen shelter, football pitches, open grassland and a wildflower meadow.

== History ==
Boreham Wood moved to Meadow Park from their previous ground at Eldon Avenue in 1963. A new main stand was built shortly afterwards. That was demolished in 1999 and replaced by a stand with a cantilevered roof. A new West Stand was opened in 2014. A new North Bank terrace was opened in 2019, sharing the name of one of the stands from Arsenal's traditional former home of Highbury.

== Record attendance ==
The record attendance for the ground is 4,101, set in an FA Cup second round match against St Albans City on 6 December 2021.
