= Water End =

Water End or Waterend may refer to the following places in England:

- Water End, Bedford, Bedfordshire
- Water End, Maulden, Central Bedfordshire
- Water End, Wrestlingworth, Central Bedfordshire
- Waterend, Buckinghamshire
- Waterend, Cumbria
- Water End, East Riding of Yorkshire
- Water End, Essex
- Water End, Hampshire
- Water End, Dacorum, Hertfordshire
- Water End, Welwyn Hatfield, Hertfordshire
- Water End Swallow Holes, Hertfordshire
- Waterend, Hertfordshire
- Waterend, Gloucestershire
