= Radlett railway station =

National Rail station in Hertfordshire, England

Radlett
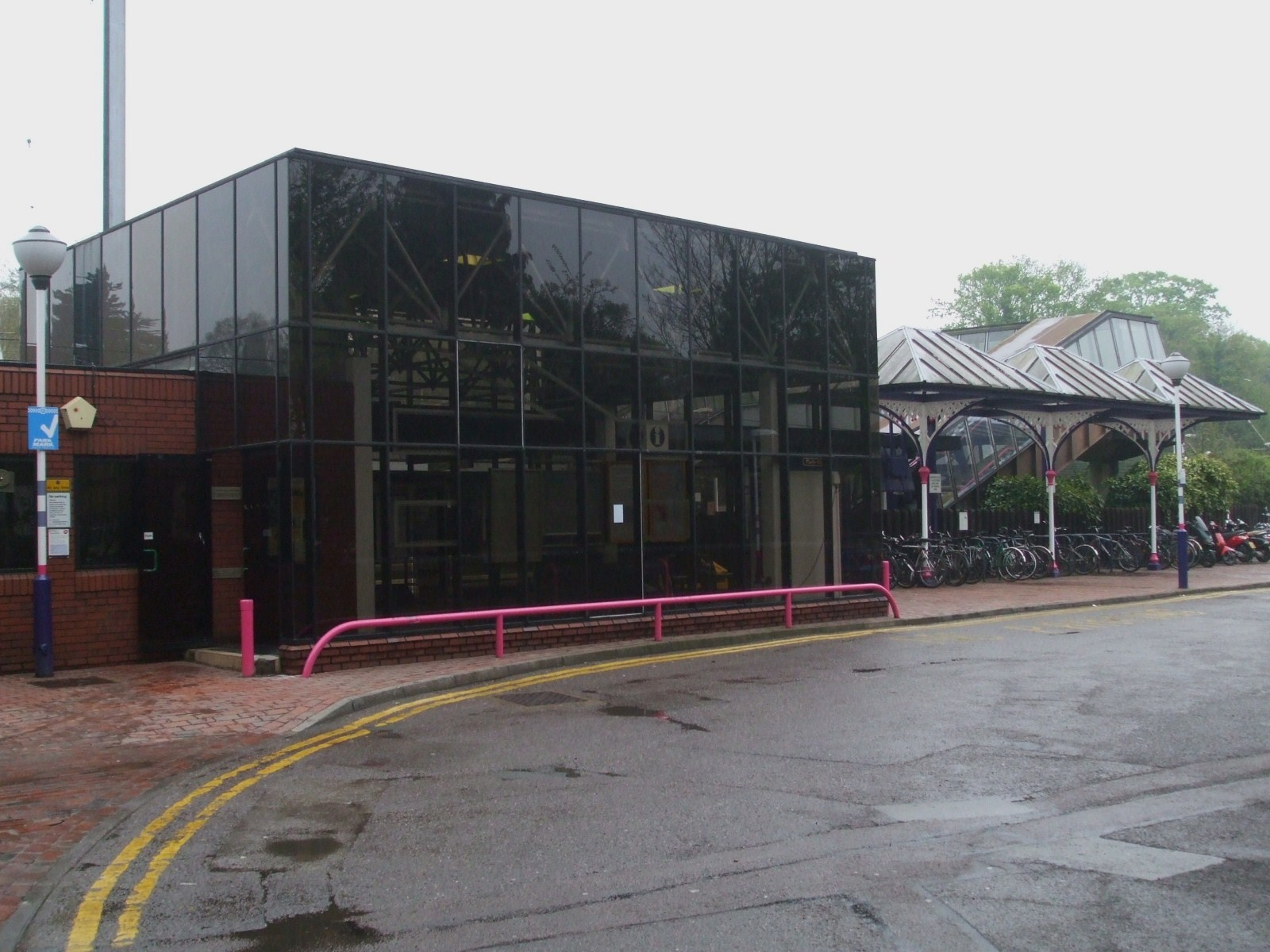
- Interactive map of Radlett

General information
- Location: Radlett
- Local authority: Borough of Hertsmere
- Grid reference: TQ164998
- Managed by: Thameslink
- Station code: RDT
- DfT category: D
- Number of platforms: 4
- Accessible: Yes, Southbound only
- Fare zone: B

National Rail annual entry and exit
- 2020–21: ▼0.282 million
- 2021–22: ▲0.724 million
- 2022–23: ▲1.082 million
- 2023–24: ▲1.227 million
- 2024–25: ▲1.270 million

Key dates
- 1 October 1868: Station opened

Other information
- External links: Departures; Facilities
- Coordinates: 51.685°N 0.317°W

Radlett railway station serves the village of Radlett, in Hertfordshire, England. It is a stop on the Midland Main Line; it is situated 15 miles 17 chains (24.5 km) down the line from London St Pancras, between Elstree & Borehamwood to the south and St Albans City to the north. The station and all trains serving it are operated by Govia Thameslink Railway on the Thameslink route.

== History ==
The original station was built by the Midland Railway in 1868 on its extension to St Pancras; the intention had been to name the station Aldenham. In the early 20th century, Walter Phillimore, who owned Radlett, built many houses, one of the first "commuter villages".

In 1979, the station was rebuilt at a cost of £500,000 as part of the Midland Suburban Electrification scheme between St Pancras and Bedford. The rebuilt station, which used the same box-shaped architectural design as the new station at Bedford, was formally opened on 17 December 1979 by the local MP, Cecil Parkinson. Speaking at the opening ceremony, British Rail London Divisional Manager, Harry Reed, expressed the hope that electrification would be extended to Kettering and then from Bletchley to Bedford.

== Ticketing ==
The station has a PlusBus scheme where train and bus tickets can be bought together for a cheaper price. In Summer 2019, Radlett became part of TfL's Oyster card and contactless payment travel system.

== Services ==
All services at Radlett are operated by Govia Thameslink Railway, using Class 700 electric multiple units.

The typical off-peak service in trains per hour is:

- 6 tph to St Albans City of which 2 continue to Luton
- 2 tph to Rainham via Dartford
- 4 tph to Sutton (2 of these run via Mitcham Junction and 2 run via Wimbledon)

During peak hours, the station is served by additional services between Luton and Orpington via Catford, as well as some late evening services to and from Bedford.

The station is also served by a night service between Bedford and Three Bridges on Sunday to Friday nights.

East Midlands Railway services between St Pancras, Leeds, Sheffield, Leicester and Nottingham run through at speed, but do not stop. Interchange with these inter-city services can be made at Luton and St Pancras.

Preceding station	National Rail	Following station
St Albans City	Thameslink Thameslink	Elstree & Borehamwood
