= Aldenham Country Park =

Protected area in Hertfordshire, England

Coordinates: 51°38′50″N 00°18′50″W

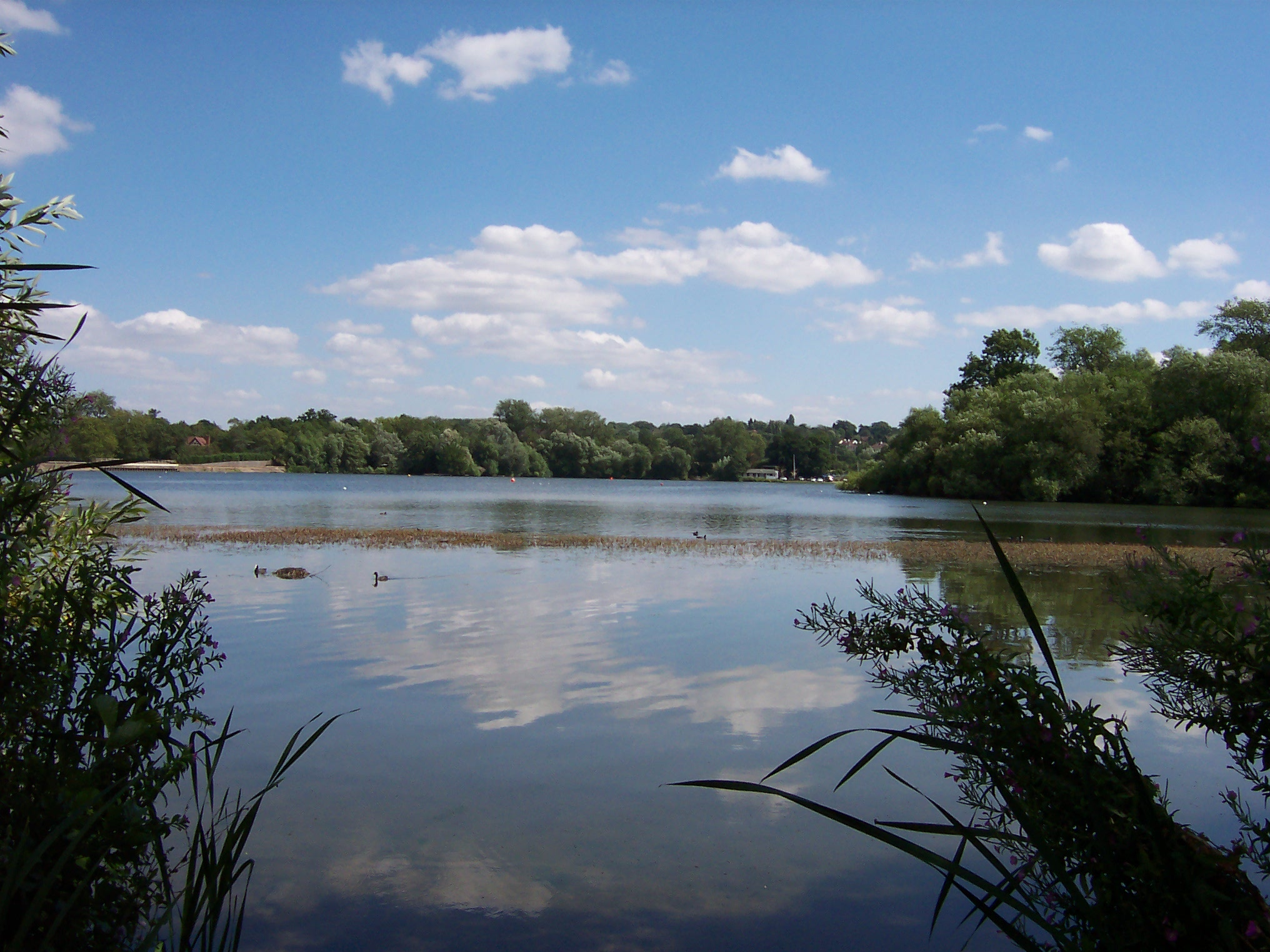
The lake at Aldenham Country Park

Aldenham Country Park is a 175-acre (0.71 km^{2}) parkland and woodland, including Aldenham Reservoir. It is now part of the Watling Chase Community Forest, near Elstree, Hertfordshire, England.

Aldenham Reservoir was excavated by French prisoners of war in 1795 to help maintain local river levels after the Grand Union Canal was built. It is held as a reserve public water supply.

The park supports walking, fishing and sailing activities, has playgrounds, Special Needs Centre and a Disney-backed Winnie-the-Pooh theme area. Since 1984, it has been a centre for breeding rare livestock (one of seventeen Rare Breeds Survival Trust centres in the UK), including Aldenham Longhorn cattle, Bagot goats, Berkshire and Tamworth pigs, and Norfolk Horn and English Leicester sheep.
