= Mimmshall Brook =

River in southern England

Coordinates: 51°43′25″N 0°13′06″W

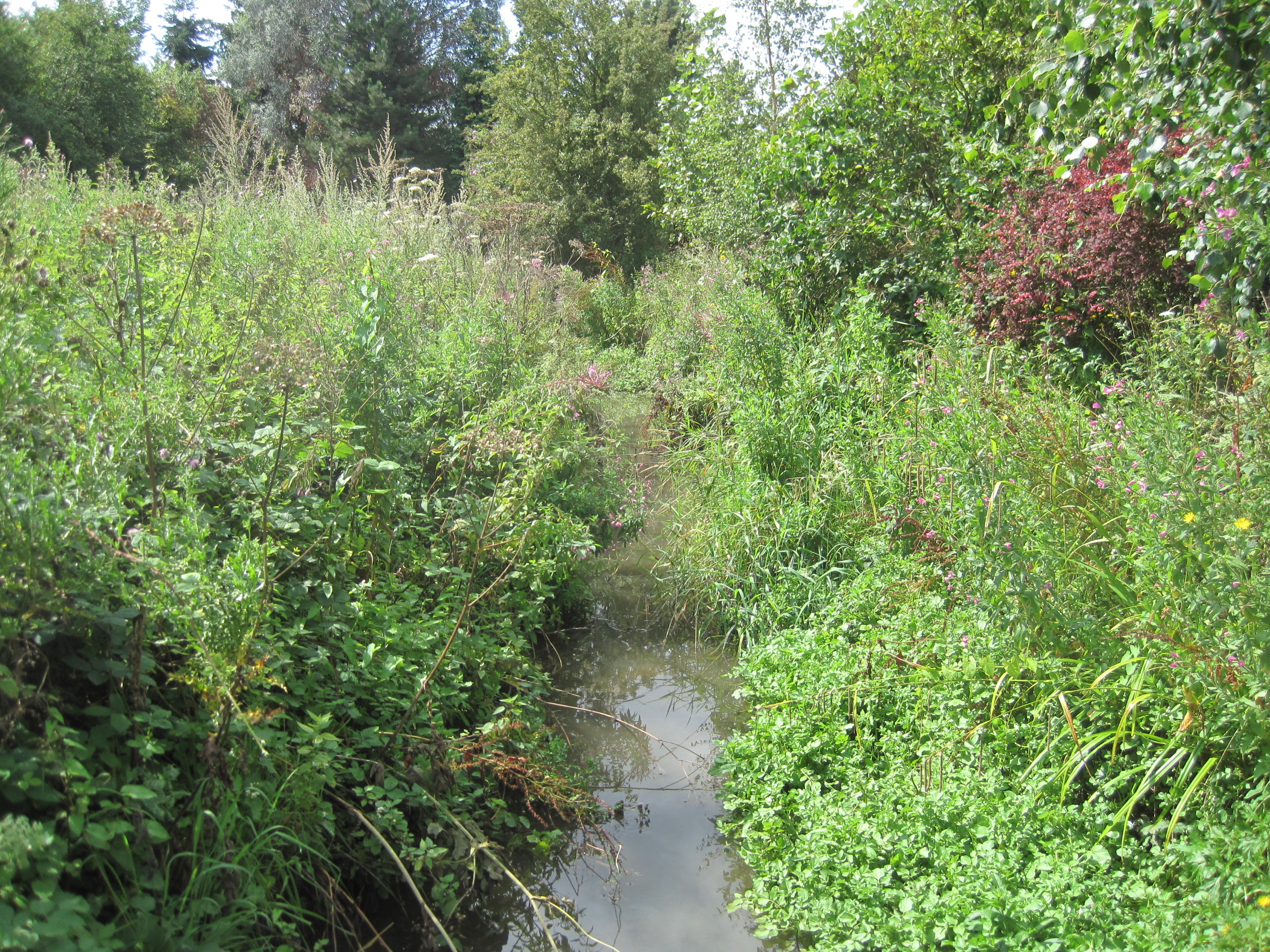
Mimmshall Brook in Saffron Green Meadows

Mimmshall Brook is a 9.8 kilometres (6.1 mi) long stream (brook) in Greater London and Hertfordshire, England. Rising from two sources—one in Hertsmere, Hertfordshire, and the other in Arkley, London Borough of Barnet—the brook drains into a catchment area of 52 km^{2} (20 sq mi) at Water End Swallow Holes, Welham Green, North Mymms. It is a tributary of the River Colne.

== Course ==
The Mimmshall Brook rises from two sources—Saffron Green Meadows in the borough of Hertsmere, Hertfordshire, and near Arkley Lane and Pastures in Arkley in the London Borough of Barnet. The Saffron stream flows east to meet the northbound Arkley stream at Saffron Green Meadows. From there, Mimmshall Brook flows a northeasterly course until Dyrham Park, when it turns north. It then flows into Dancers Hill and under an unnamed grade II listed bridge before flowing under the M25 motorway (London Orbital Motorway) via a culvert. From here, the Mimmshall Brook flows through Wash Lane Common in the civil parish of South Mimms. There, it receives the waters of Clarehall Brook and Bentleyheath Brook. It then receives the waters of Potters Bar Brook at Mymms Hall Livery Stables, before draining into a catchment area of 52 km^{2} (20 sq mi) at Water End Swallow Holes, Welham Green, North Mymms. It is from these sinkholes that the River Colne rises.
