= River Colne, Hertfordshire =

River in south England

Colne
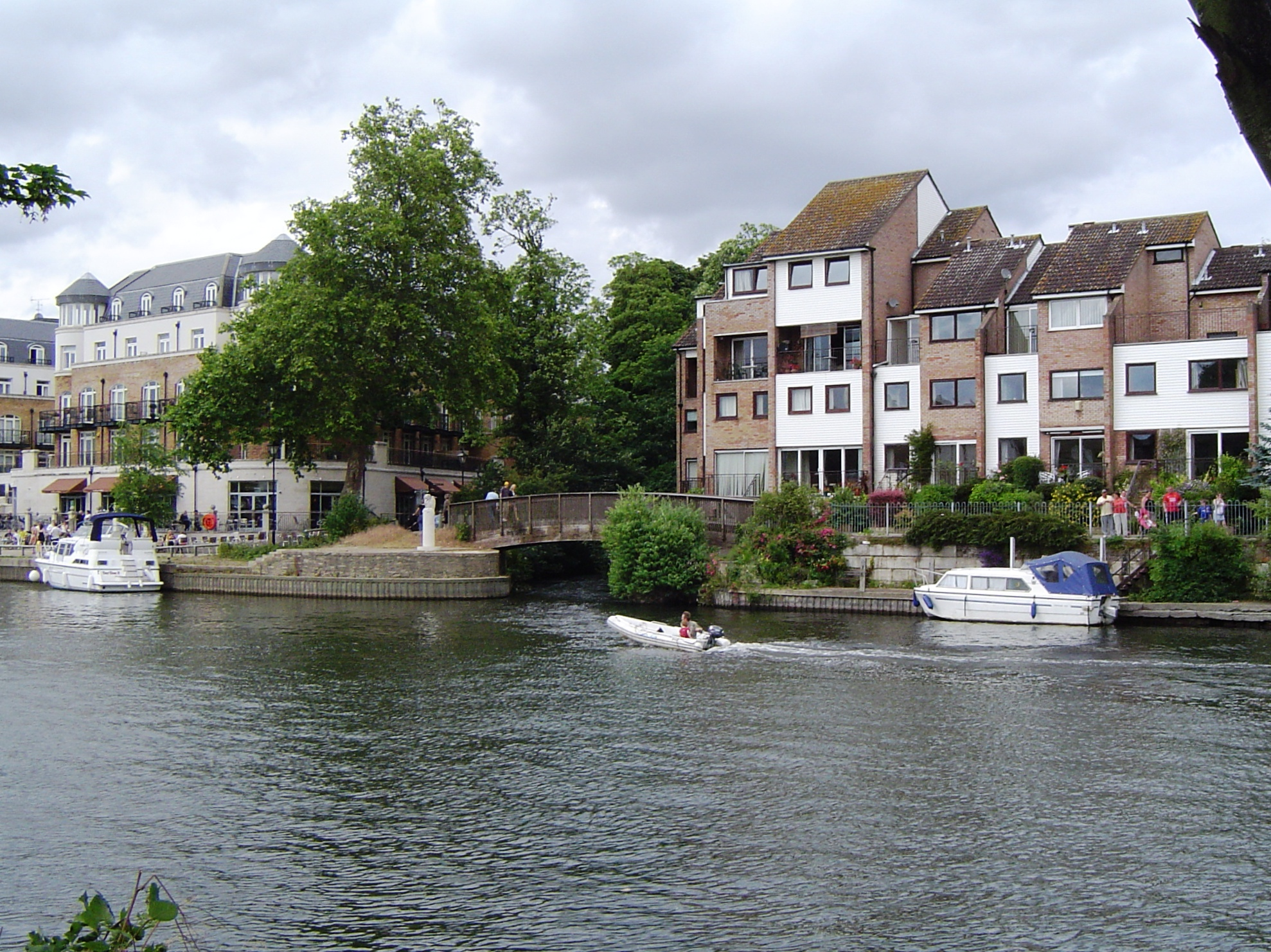
- River Colne as it joins the Thames at Staines-upon-Thames

Location
- Country: England
- Counties: Hertfordshire, Greater London, Buckinghamshire, Surrey, Berkshire
- Towns: Watford, Rickmansworth, Uxbridge, West Drayton, Staines-upon-Thames

Physical characteristics
- Source: Unnamed brook
  - location: east of Bell Bar, Brookmans Park
  - coordinates: 51.7306°N 0.1798°W
  - elevation: 410 feet (120 m)
- 2nd source: "Water End" brook
  - location: east side of North Mymms Park (coalesence of two streams, liable-to-flood meadow)
- Mouth: River Thames
  - location: Staines-upon-Thames town centre
  - coordinates: 51.4329°N 0.5152°W
  - elevation: 48 feet (15 m)
- Length: 58 km (36 mi)
- Discharge
  - location: Denham, Buckinghamshire (rate at lower coalescence)
  - average: 4.05 m^{3}/s (143 cu ft/s)
  - minimum: 0.74 m^{3}/s (26 cu ft/s)26 August 1976
  - maximum: 18.4 m^{3}/s (650 cu ft/s)14 October 1993
- Discharge
  - location: Berrygrove, Berry Grove Lane, Watford (rate at mid-to-upper coalescence)
  - average: 0.79 m^{3}/s (28 cu ft/s)

Basin features
- River system: Thames Basin
- Tributaries
  - left: Mimmshall Brook, Potters Bar Brook, Tyttenhanger Stream, Tykes Water (The Brook (Radlett)), Hillfield Brook, River Pinn
  - right: Ellen Brook and river: Ver, Gade, Chess, Misbourne
- Number of distributaries including namesake: 6

The Colne (/ˈkoʊln/) is a river and a tributary of the River Thames in England. Just over half its course is in south Hertfordshire. Downstream, it forms the boundary between Buckinghamshire and the London Borough of Hillingdon. The confluence with the River Thames is on the Staines reach (above Penton Hook Lock) at Staines-upon-Thames.

Two of its distributaries, constructed in the 1600 – 1750 period largely for aesthetic reasons for Hampton Court and for Syon Park, have been maintained. Their main purpose was not drinking water but these can be likened to the New River in scale and in date. Crossing its route, many viaducts and a canal, the intersecting Grand Union Canal, have been recognised for pioneering engineering during the Industrial Revolution.

Digging for gravel and clay along its lower course near Rickmansworth has created a belt of flooded pits below the water table, as established lakes, many of which are well-adapted habitats for wildlife, protected as nature reserves. The river, meadows and lakes form the Colne Valley regional park covering 43 square miles (110 km^{2}).

== Route ==
The Colne becomes universally so-named after two close subterranean streams converge at a spring, or in very wet weather in the meadows above, all along the east side (Tollgate Road) of North Mymms Park in Hertfordshire. The source streams are long, multi-source, in final, northern stages, partly underground tributaries: a north-eastern, which can be considered the upper Colne; and the Mimmshall Brook. Their main sources are 2.5 to 4 mi (4.0 to 6.4 km): in western Northaw, Brookmans Park, Hadley, London and Borehamwood, draining much of those places. A seasonal, intra-parochial stream runs under the seven-building village of North Mymms draining most of the park, which, with adjoining woods is a small square plateau, sloping down to its corners except the south-west.

Shallow swallow holes of the two brooks are in North Mymms' Water End, centred on so-named combined surface flow. From the Water End Swallow Holes the Colne runs west, longer NNW, then west then receives the Ellen Brook and turns SSW, then meanders south-west, bounding central and residential Watford and Oxhey, also bounding Rickmansworth and Batchworth, then for a similar total stretch bounding Greater London (and Spelthorne), east and (through anabranch ditches) Buckinghamshire, west. Specifically, it passes between West Hyde, near Maple Cross, and Harefield, passes Denham Green then passes Uxbridge, where it parallels the Grand Union Canal and its first main anabranch, the Frays River which is co-fed by the Pinn between Cowley and Yiewsley, Greater London. The Colne Brook splits off as a distributary between New Denham and Uxbridge. After this, at West Drayton, the Frays rejoins and the Wraysbury River, the second main anabranch, and Duke of Northumberland's River divide off.

Soon after, at Longford, the intake is given to the Longford River, a 12-mile (19 km) artificial channel created in 1610 for King Charles I to supply the water features in Bushy Park and the rectangular lakes in Hampton Court Park.

The Colne's drainage basin extends almost as far north again as its northern limit – the inflowing Gade, Ver and Misbourne extend well into the Chilterns. Opposite, the other 2/3 of outer west and north-west London is drained by the Pymmes Brook, Brent, or Crane sub-basins of the Thames. In the north-west, centred on Tring's northern boundary the Chiltern ridge is most noticeable, a watershed of this basin and that of the River Great Ouse, north and east towards the Wash.

=== Eponymous settlements and indirect reference within a district name ===
The villages of Colney Heath east of St Albans, London Colney south of St Albans, Colney Street (almost wholly a large business park) north of Radlett and Colnbrook between Slough and Heathrow take their name from the river. Three Rivers District Council covers part of Hertfordshire and is named after the River Colne and its two tributaries, the River Chess and the River Gade.

=== Use of valley and river for navigation ===
Among early proposals to link the river to London was one in 1641 by Sir Edward Forde for a navigable canal, the main purpose of which seems to have been the supply of clean water, and two in 1766, for canals from Marylebone to the river at Uxbridge and another from Marylebone to West Drayton.

The river underwent considerable change in the 1790s, when the Grand Junction Canal (which became part of the Grand Union Canal in 1929) was routed along the valley and still takes the river channel for part of its course. Construction began from Brentford, where it used for 3 miles (4.8 km) the channel of the River Brent, and progressed westwards then northwards, with it reaching Uxbridge in November 1794. To reach the Midlands it continued along the river channel until its junction with the River Gade, which it ran parallel to, but did not take over the channel. The Slough Arm was built in 1882 which required three aqueducts to carry it close to its junction with the Grand Junction, to cross the Fray's River, the River Colne and the Colne Brook.

Between Croxley Green, where the River Gade joins the Colne, and Thorney/West Drayton, below the Slough Arm, the river channels thread their way between many large lakes, some of which were once watercress beds, some chalk pits, and some of which were the result of brickmaking, an industry that developed over several miles of the valley after 1800, when the Grand Junction Canal company advertised the presence of good brick earth, discovered during the construction of the canal.

== Structures ==
There are two London Coal Duty markers beside the river, which mark points at which duty became payable on coal entering the London area. The first is on the north side of the river in Colney Heath Local Nature Reserve, and is a square-section cast iron pillar made by Henry Grissell at his Regents Canal ironworks and erected in 1861 or 1862. It is 5 feet (1.5 m) high and is painted white. The second is a stone obelisk, 13 feet (4.0 m) high, with a square base, which was erected at Colne Bridge in 1861. It was moved from its original position to the other side of the river in 1984 when it was repaired by Watford Borough Council. It is close to the five-arched Colne Viaduct, which was built in 1837 to carry the London to Birmingham Railway over the river. Each of the arches spans around 40 feet (12 m) and is 45 feet (14 m) high. The structure was designed by Robert Stephenson, and is grade II listed.

At London Colney, there is a seven-arched brick bridge which carries Barnet Road over the river. It dates from 1774 and is called Telford's Bridge, although it is not thought to have been designed by Thomas Telford. It was modified in the 20th century when parapets and railings were added.

There was a long-running dispute over water levels in the Batchford area, following the construction of the Grand Junction Canal, which were resolved in 1825, when an 8.2-foot (2.5 m) obelisk was erected in a pond, to act as a water gauge. The obelisk records the agreement made between the canal company, John Dickinson who was the owner of papermills at Batchworth, and R. Williams of Moor Park, who was the landowner.

== Tributaries and distributaries ==
From its mouth to its source, the Colne's named tributaries, anabranches and to-Thames distributaries are:

- Sweeps Ditch (distributary in Staines-upon-Thames)
- Wraysbury River (anabranch West Drayton to Staines)
- the Ash (distributary from Staines at Sunbury on Thames/Shepperton border)
- Colne Brook (distributary from Uxbridge Moor to Hythe End, Wraysbury)
  - the Alder Bourne (Fulmer to Uxbridge Moor)
- Longford River (man made - distributary from Longford to Bushy Park and Hampton Court)
- Duke of Northumberland River (man-made distributary from West Drayton to Isleworth)
- Frays River (anabranch Watford to West Drayton)
  - the Pinn (Harrow Weald to West Drayton)
- the Misbourne (Amersham to Uxbridge)
- the Chess (Chesham to Rickmansworth)
- the Gade
  - the Bulbourne
- Hillfield Brook
- the Ver (from Dolittle Mill)
- Tykes Water (or The Brook, Radlett) (from Aldenham Reservoir)
- Ellen Brook (from Hatfield)
  - Butterwick Brook (from eastern St Albans)
- Water End (north, broad end of the Mimmshall Brook having drained brook from north Brookmans Park via Welham Green, identifiable as the source and others below)
- Mimmshall Brook (Elstree to Water End (broad meandering end and sinks))
  - Catherine Bourne (Shenley to Mimmshall Brook)
  - Ray Brook (Brookmans Park to Water End (see above))
  - Potters Bar Brook (Potters Bar to Water End (see above))

== See also ==
- Tributaries of the River Thames
- List of rivers in England
- Mid Colne Valley

== Bibliography ==
- Hadfield, Charles (1970). The Canals of the East Midlands. David and Charles. ISBN 0-7153-4871-X.
- Nicholson (2006). Nicholson Guides Vol 1: Grand Union, Oxford and the South East. Harper Collins. ISBN 978-0-00-721109-8.

Next confluence upstream	River Thames	Next confluence downstream
Colne Brook (north)	River Colne	Abbey River (south)
