= Wraysbury River =

River in London, England

Coordinates: 51.434°N 0.514°W

The Wraysbury River is an anabranch of the River Colne to the west of London.

== Course ==
The river leaves the Colne at West Drayton and runs under the M4 motorway then close to Longford when it passes under the M25 motorway. A branch then feeds the Colne Brook by the Poyle Channel while the Wraysbury River runs parallel to the M25, through a local wildlife site called the Lower Colne, then crossing back under the M25 by the Wraysbury Reservoir. The Wraysbury then flows across Staines Moor and into Staines and rejoins the River Colne in the town centre, shortly before it flows into the River Thames.

The northern part of the river's course has been heavily modified to accommodate the M4 and M25 motorways.

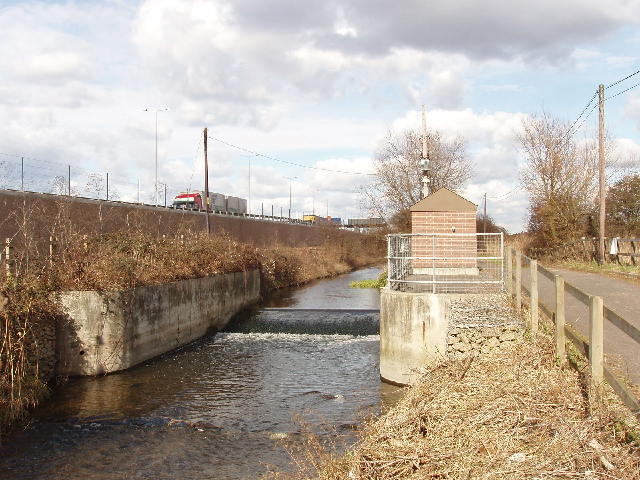
Wraysbury River, flow gauging station, and M25

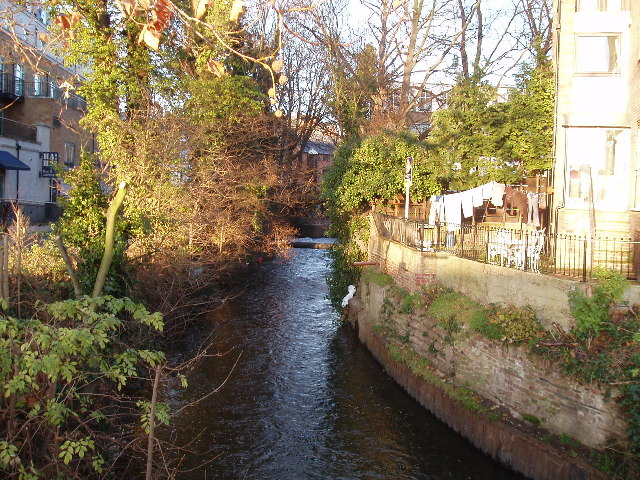
Outlet of Wraysbury River and River Colne

== See also ==
- List of rivers of England
