= Lynn Farleigh =

English actress (born 1942)

- Born: Marilyn J. Farleigh; 3 May 1942 (age 84); Bath, Somerset, England
- Education: Guildhall School of Music and Drama
- Occupation: Actress
- Years active: 1962–present
- Spouses: Michael Jayston (m. 1965; div. 1970) David Yip (m. 1989, divorced) John Woodvine (m. 1996; died 2025)
- Children: 2

Marilyn J. "Lynn" Farleigh (born 3 May 1942) is an English actress of stage and screen.

== Early life ==
Farleigh was born in Bath, Somerset on 3 May 1942 to Joseph Sydney Farleigh and his wife Marjorie Norah (née Clark). She attended the Redland High School for Girls in Bristol, and trained for the stage at the Guildhall School of Music and Drama.

== Career ==
She made her first professional appearance in May 1962 in a production of Under Milk Wood at the Salisbury Playhouse, and joined the Royal Shakespeare Company in October 1966, playing Castiza in The Revenger's Tragedy at Stratford upon Avon. She made her New York debut with the RSC in April 1967 at the Music Box Theatre, playing Ruth in a production of Harold Pinter's The Homecoming.

Her first London performance came in January 1968 as Helena in the RSC revival of All's Well That Ends Well. In the same Aldwych Theatre season she also played Amanda in The Relapse, August 1968, and Portia in Julius Caesar, November 1968.

In July 1969 at the Royal Court Theatre Upstairs she appeared in the Peter Tegel double-bill as the Biology Mistress in Blim at School and Anna in Poet of the Anemones; and in the following year played Simone in The Friends, written and directed by Arnold Wesker (Round House, March 1970); and Beatrice Justine in Exiles by James Joyce, directed by Harold Pinter (Mermaid Theatre, November 1970).

Subsequent theatre performances include:

- Monique Combes in Suzanna Andler by Marguerite Duras (Aldwych, March 1973)
- Anne in Ashes by David Rudkin (Open Space, January 1974)
- Jennifer Dubedat in The Doctor's Dilemma (Mermaid Theatre, April 1975)
- Beryl in Sex and Kinship in a Savage Society (Theatre Upstairs, July 1975)
- Charlotte in A Room with a View, adapted from the novel by E. M. Forster (Prospect Theatre Company, Albery Theatre, November 1975)
- Viola in Twelfth Night (St George's Islington, April 1976)
- Lady Anne in Richard III (St George's Islington, July 1976)
- Anwar in The Ascent of Mount Fuji (Hampstead Theatre, June 1977)
- Elizabeth in Sovereignty Under Elizabeth (Almost Free, December 1977)
- Agnes in Brand, (National Theatre Olivier, April 1978)
- Mrs Forsythe in Shout Across the River (RSC Donmar Warehouse, September 1978)
- Jane in Hang of the Jail (RSC Donmar Warehouse, December 1978)
- Margaret in Close of Play by Simon Gray (National Theatre Lyttelton, May 1979)
- Elizabeth Proctor in The Crucible (National Theatre Cottesloe, October 1980; and the Comedy Theatre, March 1981)
- Simone in The Workshop (Oxford Playhouse/Hampstead Theatre, January 1981)
- Marian Wade in Harvest by Ellen Dryden (Ambassadors Theatre, October 1981)
- Mary Fearon in The Man Who Fell in Love with His Wife (Lyric Studio Hammersmith, February 1984)
- Mrs Alving in Ghosts (Shaw Theatre, May 1984)
- Hermione in The Winter's Tale (RSC Tour, Christ Church, London E1, December 1984)
- Elizabeth Proctor in The Crucible (RSC Tour, Christ Church, London E1, December 1984)
- Mary and Mary Magdalene in The Mysteries: The Nativity; The Passion; and Doomsday (National at the Lyceum Theatre, May 1985)
- Chorus in Medea (Lyric Hammersmith, May 1986)
- Dame Overdo in Bartholomew Fair (Open Air Theatre, Regent's Park, June 1987)
- Titania in A Midsummer Night's Dream (Open Air Theatre, Regent's Park, June 1987)
- Helga in M. Butterfly (Haymarket Theatre, Leicester and then Shaftesbury Theatre, March – April 1989)
- Amy in Forget-Me-Not Lane, by Peter Nichols (Greenwich Theatre, March 1990)
- Simone Engel in Black Angel (King's Head Theatre, July 1990)
- Hermiione in The Winter's Tale (English Shakespeare Company, Aldwych Theatre, April 1991)
- Lady Macbeth in Macbeth (English Shakespeare Company, Royalty Theatre, November 1992)
- Juno in The Tempest (English Shakespeare Company, Arts Threshold, November 1992)
- Mrs Gamsey in Inadmissible Evidence (National Theatre Lyttelton, June 1993)
- Stenographer, Nurse, Matron in Machinal by Lucy Treadwell (National Theatre Lyttelton, October 1993)
- Mrs Bunting in The Lodger by Patrick Prior from Mrs Marie Belloc Lowndes (Theatre Royal Stratford East, October 1996)
- Agatha in The Family Reunion by T S Eliot (RSC Swan Theatre, Stratford upon Avon, June 1999; and Barbican The Pit, February 2000)
- Elizabeth in The Prince of Homburg by Heinrich von Kleist (Lyric Hammersmith, February 2002)
- Bernarda in The House of Bernarda Alba by Lorca (Orange Tree Theatre, March 2003)
- Phoebe Rice in The Entertainer by John Osborne (Nuffield Theatre Southampton, November 2004)
- Nella in One Under by Winsome Pinnock (Tricycle Theatre, February 2005)
- Moira Paterson/Princess Jill in Pravda by Howard Brenton and David Hare (Chichester Festival Theatre, September 2006)
- Amy Hillcrist in The Skin Game by John Galsworthy (Orange Tree Theatre, March 2007)
- Enid in Salonika by Louise Page (West Yorkshire Playhouse, January 2008)

== Television and film ==
Although primarily a theatre actress, Lynn Farleigh is probably widest known for playing Helen Wycliffe in Wycliffe from 1996 to 1998, Krupskaya opposite Patrick Stewart's Lenin in the historical BBC drama Fall of Eagles, and the glamorous Vivien Ashton (codename Solange) in the second series of the LWT secret agent series Wish Me Luck broadcast in 1989.

Her other TV appearances since 1964 include: The Rivals, Bergerac, Eyeless in Gaza, Bill Brand, Steptoe and Son (1974), Murder Most English, Z-Cars in which she played Ann Fazakerley, the 1978 miniseries The Word, the drama series Out and Bad Girls. She also appeared in the films Three into Two Won't Go (1969) and Voices (1973) and provided the voice of the cat in the animated film of Watership Down (1978).

She portrayed Mrs Bennet's sister, Mrs Phillips, in the 1995 BBC version of Pride and Prejudice. In 2013 and 2014, she played Nora White in EastEnders.

In 2021 Lynn Farleigh contributed to, and participated in, a YouTube documentary tribute to Alfred Burke entitled Alfred Burke is Frank Marker.

== Personal life ==
Farleigh married three times; to Michael Jayston in 1965 (divorced 1970); to David Yip in 1989 (divorced); and to John Woodvine in 1996 (he died in 2025).

== Bibliography ==
- Who's Who in the Theatre 17th edition, Gale (1981) ISBN 0-8103-0235-7
- Theatre Record and its annual indexes
