= Water End Swallow Holes =

Site of Special Scientific Interest near Welham Green in Hertfordshire, England

Coordinates: 51.724°N 0.219°W

Water End Swallow Holes SSSI
- Site of Special Scientific Interest
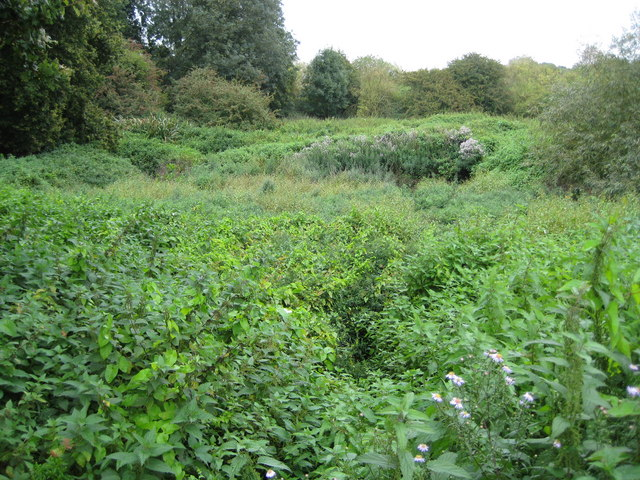
- Location of Water End Swallow Holes SSSI.
- Area of search: Hertfordshire
- Grid reference: TL230043
- Interest: Geological and Biological
- Area: 11.3 ha (28 acres)
- Notification date: 1969
- Location map: Magic Map

Water End Swallow Holes is a Site of Special Scientific Interest (SSSI) covering 11.3 hectares (28 acres) at Water End, near Welham Green in Hertfordshire, England. The site lies at the point where the Mimmshall Brook and its tributary the Potterells Stream sink completely underground into more than fifteen swallow holes developed in the chalk, making it, according to its SSSI citation, the only major example in England of chalk swallets that form a permanent feature of the landscape. It has been described as "the most significant chalk stream sink in England".

== Geology ==
The site sits at the edge of the London Basin, where a covering of Eocene London Clay and the sandy Paleocene Reading Beds thins and gives way to the underlying Cretaceous chalk. The Mimmshall Brook catchment drains an area of around 52 square kilometres (20 sq mi), flowing north across the clay before reaching the chalk outcrop at Water End. Along the zone where the chalk is more fissured, jointing and solution processes have enlarged cracks into channels, which eventually collapse to form swallow holes.. From time to time the collapses reveal short negotiable cave passages.

The number, size, and locations of the swallow holes are not fixed: new holes open, sometimes overnight, while others silt up and close. Nineteenth-century observers described holes large enough to swallow a person, and a 1937 survey counted 28 holes upstream of Water End and 14 at the site itself, more than are typically visible today. Comparison of historical maps shows the main channel shifting position between 1898 and 1919, and a new swallow hole system developing between 1938 and 1973, changes attributed to increased discharge from a catchment that has become progressively urbanised.

== Hydrology ==
Under normal conditions the Mimmshall Brook and Potterells Stream disappear entirely into the swallow holes, with no surface channel continuing beyond the site. Only when the sinks' capacity — estimated at around 1,000 litres per second (13,000 imp gal/min) — is exceeded does a temporary lake form over the site, spilling west along a channel into the River Colne.

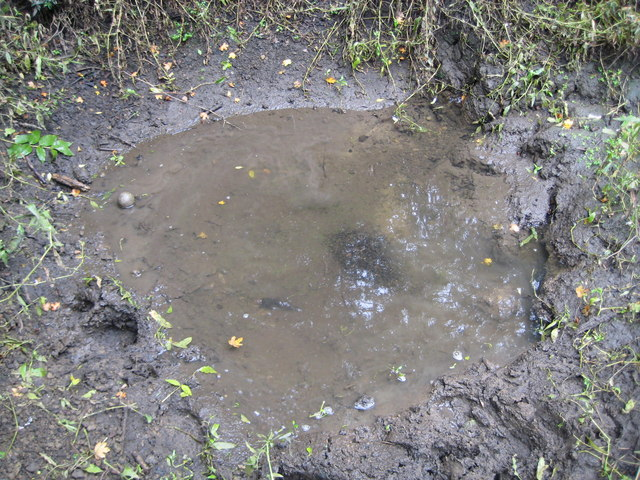
One of the swallow holes at Water End

The destination of the sinking water was established by fluorescein dye tracing carried out in 1937 and reported the same year in the Metropolitan Water Board's annual report on London's water supply. C. H. H. Harold's account found the dye reappearing at springs on the New River to the north-east, around 16 kilometres (9.9 mi) away, after about three days A companion study by R. E. Morris and C. H. Fowler included in the same report found it resurging at four separate springs spread over 12 kilometres (7.5 mi) of the Lea Valley, between 8–15 kilometres (5.0–9.3 mi) from Water End, with an average flow-through rate of about 5,500 metres (6,000 yd) per day. Local tradition recalls dye reappearing in the Lea at Ware, consistent with these findings.

Water End is not unique in England in having a river sink into chalk: the River Mole in Surrey loses flow continuously into swallow holes as it crosses the chalk of the North Downs between Dorking and Leatherhead, and in exceptionally dry years (notably 1949 and 1976) the channel has run completely dry for a stretch before the water re-emerges downstream. The distinction claimed for Water End is that its swallowing is a permanent, year-round condition rather than one that only manifests in low-flow conditions.

== Conservation ==
The site was notified as an SSSI in 1969 for its geological interest as the largest enclosed karstic drainage basin in England, and for the biological value of the varied wetland habitat around the holes, including willow carr and reed sweet-grass. Increased sediment and water flux from the urbanising catchment — including road and motorway construction — has been linked to more frequent flooding and to a risk of the remaining swallow holes silting up. Catchment management measures, including bank regrading, gravel traps, and a trash screen upstream of the site, have been proposed to address this.

== Sources ==
- Gregory, K.J., ed. (1997). Fluvial Geomorphology of Great Britain. Geological Conservation Review Series. Vol. 13. JNCC. pp. 289–230. ISBN 0-412-78930-2.
- Harold, C.H.H. (1937). "The flow and bacteriology of the underground water in the Lee Valley". The Results of the Chemical and Bacteriological Examination of the London Waters for the 12 Months Ended 31st December 1937 (incorporating research by R. E. Morris and C. H. Fowler). 32nd Annual Report of the Metropolitan Water Board. pp. 89–99.
- Maurice, L; Bunting, S; Farrant, A; Mathewson, E (2020). BGS Karst Report Series: C4. Karst in the Chalk of the Chilterns and the Berkshire and Marlborough Downs (PDF). British Geological Survey (Report). BGS Karst Report Series. p. 6.
