= Radlett =

Village in Hertfordshire, England

Coordinates: 51.685°N 0.318°W

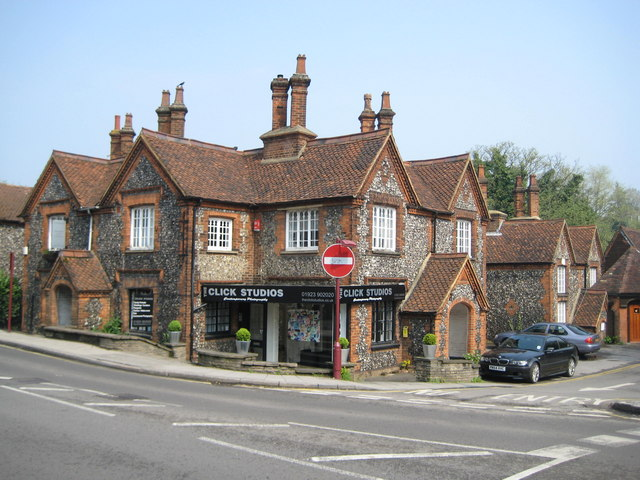
- Flint Cottages, Radlett

- Location within Hertfordshire
- Population: 10,060 (2021 census)
- OS grid reference: TQ165995
- Civil parish: Aldenham
- District: Hertsmere
- Shire county: Hertfordshire
- Region: East
- Country: England
- Sovereign state: United Kingdom
- Post town: RADLETT
- Postcode district: WD7
- Dialling code: 01923
- Police: Hertfordshire
- Fire: Hertfordshire
- Ambulance: East of England
- UK Parliament: Hertsmere

Radlett is a large village in Hertfordshire, England, between Elstree and St Albans on Watling Street, with a population of 10,060. It is in the council district of Hertsmere in the south of the county, and forms part of the civil parish of Aldenham. Radlett is located just inside the M25 motorway between Watford and Borehamwood.

== Locality ==
Radlett lies in the valley of Tykes Water, a stream that runs north from Aldenham Reservoir to the River Colne. Now entirely surrounded by the Metropolitan Green Belt, it is subject to significant 'infill' development and there is pressure to relax the Green Belt restrictions.

Radlett is located 14 miles (22.5 km) north west of the centre of London. It is one of the wealthiest places in Britain and the second most expensive town to buy a house outside London. The town contains many substantial detached houses with large gardens. In the older centre there are also a few streets with Victorian semi detached and terraced houses.

Watling Street, which is the main road through Radlett, has a wide variety of local shops and restaurants, as well as some national chain stores, a Post Office inside the local Budgens supermarket, and the Radlett Centre with a 300-seat auditorium for various performances. Attached to the Radlett Centre is the local Public Library.

There are two public houses in Radlett: "The Red Lion" and “No.58”.

== History ==
=== Pre-Roman period ===
Radlett is situated on the ancient Watling Street, one of the oldest trackways in Britain. Various archaeological finds of Mesolithic and Neolithic flints provide evidence that the Radlett area was inhabited in the Stone Age; the land was densely wooded and remained so until the Middle Ages. The Catuvellauni tribe settled in parts of Hertfordshire, near St Albans and Wheathamstead in about 80BC, although no trace of settlement has been found in or near Radlett itself. The name Radlett appears to come from the Old-English rad-gelaete meaning a junction of the roads and it is likely that the settlement grew at the point where the ancient route from Aldenham to Shenley crosses Watling Street.

=== Roman period ===
During the Roman occupation of Verulamium, the area from Radlett to Brockley Hill was home to a number of major potteries, which supplied not only the Roman capital but other parts of the province. One of these potteries is known to have existed on Loom Lane. Roman-era clay pits are still in evidence at the southern end of the village, in the area around Cobden hill and Tabard RFC. In addition, there is evidence of a Roman villa with a bath building, barn and tile kiln dating from 2nd to 4th century AD, in the area of Netherwylde Farm.

=== Post-Roman period ===
Wratten notes that the area was settled by the Saxons by the sixth century, with suggestions that a Saxon church was established on the site of Aldenham Church in King Offa's time. For most of recorded history, the land to the East of Watling Street was administered separately to that on the West.

The Domesday survey of 1086 confirms that most of the land was in the possession of the Abbey of Westminster, though parts of Titeberst (land to the east of Watling Street) were claimed by St Albans. The two major tenants were listed as Geoffrey de Mandeville and Geoffrey de Bec and they leased part of their holdings to tenant farmers. The land was densely forested but was gradually cleared throughout the medieval period for agricultural use and the population lived in dispersed farm settlements adjacent to field strips or scattered around the periphery of common land which made up a substantial part of the southern and western area of the Parish.

It is known that in the thirteenth century, gallows were erected jointly by the Abbots of Westminster and St Albans 'in a certain spot called Keneprowe' (now Kemp Row), for trials conducted at Aldenham.

Radlett seems to have consisted of two farms: Darnells (first mentioned in 1358) and Gills Hill on the west side of Watling Street; and the estates of Aldenham Lodge, Newberries and Organ Hall on the east, plus Newlands (first recorded in 1291) and a few cottages. There are records of at least two other medieval moated homesteads within the Parish – Penne's Place and Kendals, but tantalisingly little physical evidence.

The first recorded reference of Radlett comes from 1453 and it was usually spelt with one T until the mid-nineteenth century. With the dissolution of the monasteries in 1536, the disputes over land ownership in the Parish between St Albans Abbey and Westminster Abbey ceased to be viable and the land was sold to create revenue for the Crown.

=== Modern period ===
In 1823 the town was the site of the Radlett murder, a notorious crime which became the subject of numerous books and stage plays. The victim, William Weare, was killed on Gills Hill Lane (subsequently popularly known as Murder Lane), with the site gaining such notoriety that it became a tourist attraction for some time.

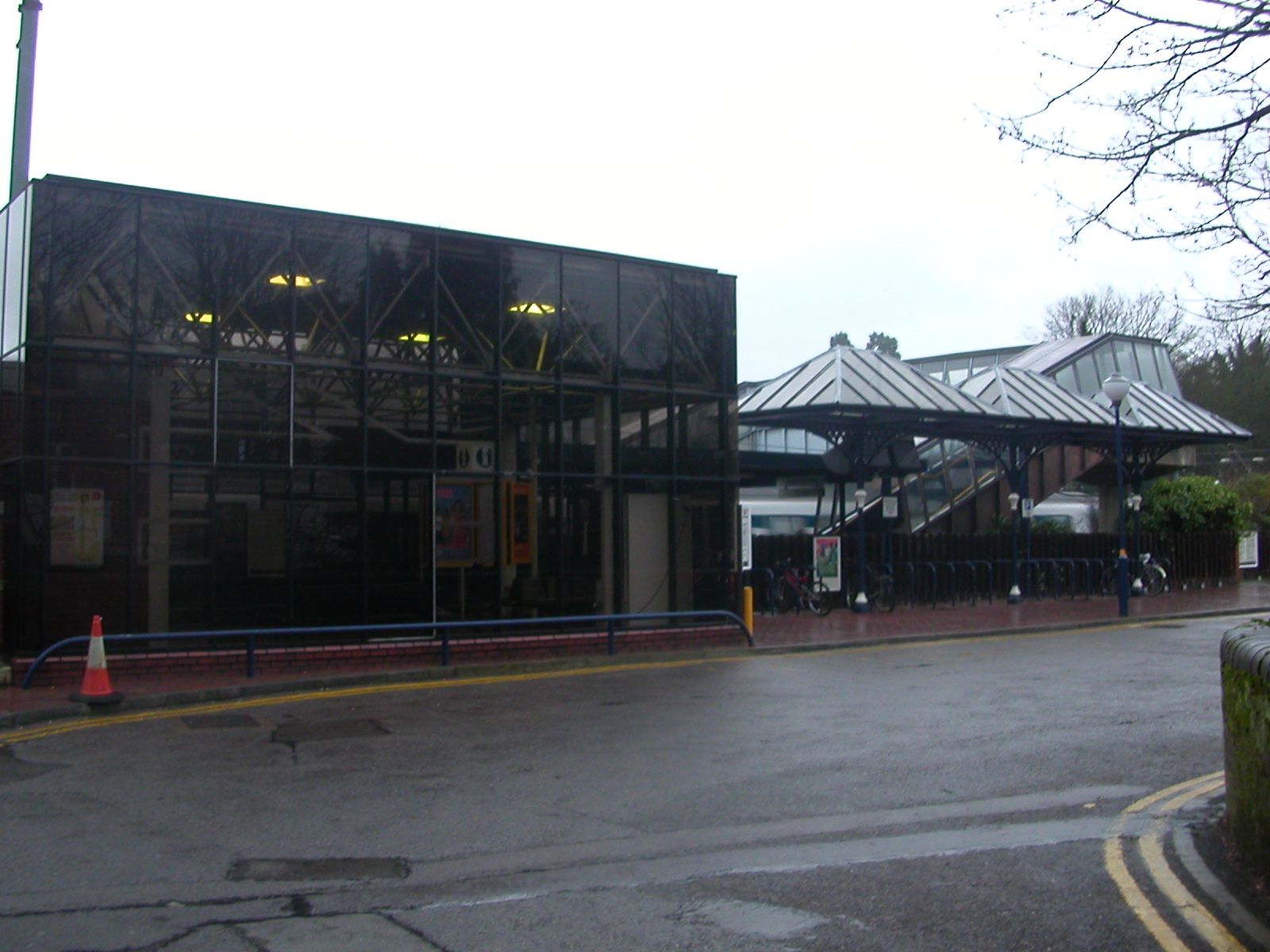
The modern ticket office at Radlett station, dating from the 1970s, contrasts with the ornate shelter above the cycle storage area.

In 1860 the Midland Railway was extended from Bedford into London and a station was built at Radlett connecting it with London. On 8 December 1865 the Ecclesiastical Parish of Radlett was created out of the eastern part of Aldenham and this marks the start of the modern history of the village. Development could only start when the landowners sold off their land for this purpose and this started in the final decade of the 19th century when land to the west of Watling Street was sold off. In 1910 the estate of Aldenham Lodge to the north of Shenley Hill was released for development and in 1935 the Newberries estate. Newberries mansion was demolished in the 1950s and Aldenham Lodge in 1964.

Handley Page Ltd opened a grass airfield just north of the town in 1929 for the production of aircraft. By 1939 Radlett Aerodrome was upgraded to have three hard runways for use in the production of Handley Page Hampden and Handley Page Halifax bombers during the Second World War. Post-war the airfield was used for production of Handley Page Hastings transport aircraft and Handley Page Hermes airliners. The SBAC held air shows here in 1946 and 1947 which subsequently moved to Farnborough. The Handley Page Victor bomber prototype was built here, with the main runway being extended in 1952 to allow flight testing, and there is now a road on this site named in its honour next to a DPD depot. Handley Page went bankrupt in 1969 and the airfield closed in 1970.

The 1948 Olympic Marathon went through Radlett. It was an out-and-back course from the Empire Stadium, Wembley.

In 1977 Eddie Kidd the stunt rider jumped over 14 London Double Decker buses at the former Radlett Aerodrome.

The introduction of the Metropolitan Green Belt in the 1950s set a legal framework limiting further outward growth beyond the then existing limits of the village, and since then new development has been restricted to infilling within the built-up area. Despite this, many new houses continue to be built in former large gardens, and the population now stands at just over 10,000.

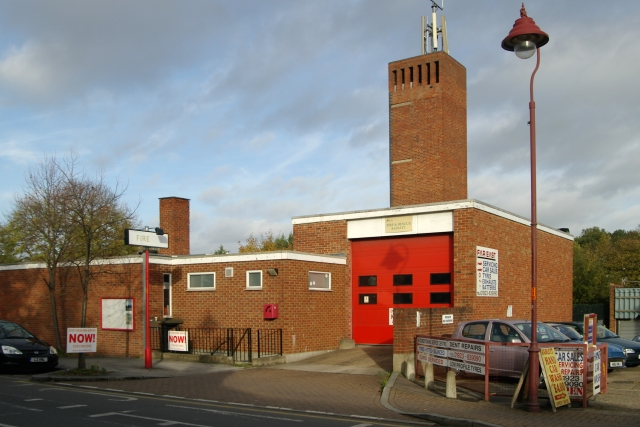
Radlett fire station

In 2005, and 2006, there was a large campaign in the village, and surrounding areas to save the Fire Station, which was opened 100 years ago. The campaign failed, and the station closed in October 2006. The campaign continued for a while after the closure, however the fire station has now been demolished.

== Governance ==
There are three tiers of local government covering Radlett, at parish, district (borough), and county level: Aldenham Parish Council, Hertsmere Borough Council, and Hertfordshire County Council.

Radlett is the main settlement within the parish of Aldenham, having grown to be significantly larger than Aldenham village. The parish council retains the historic Aldenham name, but has its offices in Radlett at the Radlett Centre. For representation on Hertsmere Borough Council, the parish of Aldenham is divided into two wards called Aldenham East and Aldenham West. The urban area of Radlett straddles these two wards.

Radlett is classed as a post town by the Royal Mail, corresponding to the WD7 postcode district, which also covers the neighbouring village of Shenley.

== Transport ==
Radlett lies close to the M25 and M1 motorways and the A1 trunk road. There is a 24-hour metro-style commuter rail service on the Thameslink route that connects Radlett railway station to central London including St Pancras International taking from as little as 21 minutes, Farringdon (25 mins), City Thameslink and Blackfriars. From Radlett there are also direct train services to London Gatwick and London Luton airports, whilst London Heathrow is a thirty-minute drive away. Radlett is part of Transport for London's (TfL) Oyster card and contactless payment travel system.

There are two main buses that run through Radlett, both operated by Uno. Route 602 runs roughly east–west connecting Watford, Radlett, St Albans and Hatfield and route 601 running roughly north–south connecting Hatfield, St Albans, Radlett and Borehamwood.

== Religion ==
=== 2021 Census data ===
As of the 2021 census, Radlett had an official Jewish population of 29.6% which was one of the highest concentrations in the country. Those identifying as Christian constituted 35.6%, forming a plurality.

Area	All people	Christian (%)	Buddhist (%)	Hindu (%)	Jewish (%)	Muslim (%)	Sikh (%)	Other (%)	No religion (%)	Not stated (%)
England and Wales	56,490,048	46.3	0.5	1.8	0.5	6.7	0.9	0.6	36.7	6.0
Radlett	10,060	35.57	0.44	4.86	29.59	1.84	0.23	0.67	19.56	7.28

=== Places of worship ===
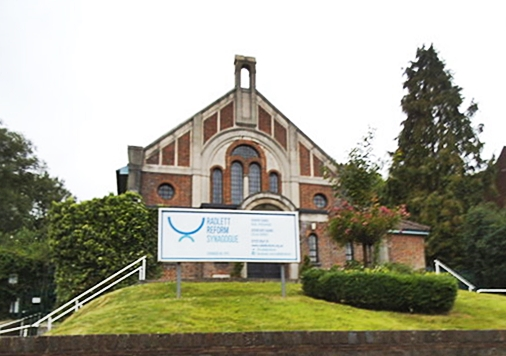
Radlett Reform Synagogue

There are four churches in Radlett: Christ Church, an Anglican church on Watling Street founded in 1864; St. Anthony of Padua Catholic Church in The Crosspath; St. John's Anglican church, a sister church of Christ Church, in Gills Hill Lane; and The United Free Church in Station Road. The United Free Church was formed by uniting the Methodist and United Reformed Churches in Radlett.

There are three synagogues: the Radlett United Synagogue which serves the Orthodox Jewish community, and the Radlett Reform Synagogue (formerly Radlett & Bushey Reform Synagogue) which serves the Reform Jewish community, as well as the Chabad of Radlett Synagogue Chabad house.

== Education ==
There are twelve schools in Radlett, catering for children aged from 2 to 11 years old:

- First Place Nursery: An independent school for 80 children aged from 3 months to 5 years old.
- Rexton House Nursery: An independent nursery with 3 sites in the Radlett area. One site provides day care, and 2 just morning sessions from children age 2 years.
- Bhaktivedanta Manor School. An independent primary school that promotes Vedic and Vaisnava culture for 21 children aged from 4 to 10. (Located in the nearby hamlet of Letchmore Heath.)
- Edge Grove School: An independent day and boarding school for 333 children aged from 3 to 13½.
- Fair Field Junior School: A state foundation school for 240 children aged from 7 to 11.
- Hertsmere Jewish Primary School: A state voluntary aided school for 480 children aged from 3 to 11.
- Newberries Primary School: A state funded school for 208 children aged from 4 to 11.
- Radlett Lodge School: An independent special school for 55 children with autism aged from 4 to 19. Run by the National Autistic Society. Accommodation for 14 boarders.
- Radlett Nursery and Infant School. An independent school for 122 children aged from 2 to 7 (closed and replaced by a day nursery in 2005).
- Radlett Preparatory School. An independent school for 420 children aged from 4 to 11, founded in 1935. The school currently has 21 classes of average 60 children per year.
- St John's Church of England Infant and Nursery School: A state controlled school for 224 children aged from 3 to 7. Which is linked to Fair Field Junior School.

As there are no mainstream secondary schools in Radlett, from the age of 11 Radlett's children attend schools in towns in the surrounding area, mostly travelling by dedicated bus services.

== Sport ==
=== Football ===
Radlett has a football club, Belstone, that currently competes in the Combined Counties League Division One.

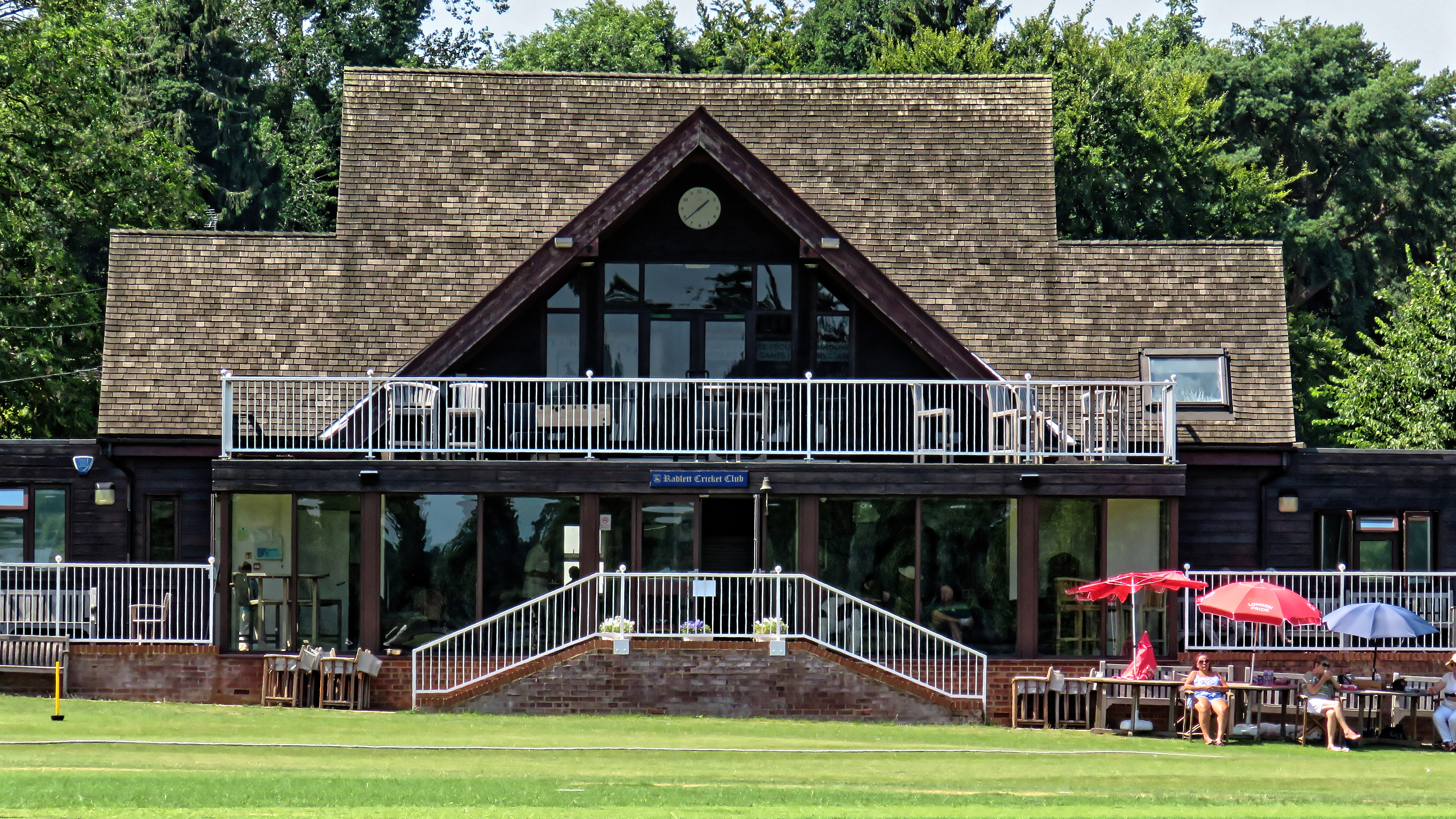
Radlett Cricket Club (2019)

=== Cricket ===
Cricket is played at Brunton Memorial Ground, which is the home ground of Radlett Cricket Club on Cobden Hill. Radlett CC, established in 1884, has a significant success record, with 8 Hertfordshire Cricket League championship titles to their name. Radlett field four senior teams in the Hertfordshire Cricket League and a junior training section play competitive cricket in the Hertfordshire Junior Leagues.

The Brunton Memorial Ground is also the venue for most Middlesex Second XI matches. It is now the training facility of Middlesex County Cricket Club and the ground hosted all their home Royal London Cup fixtures in 2019.

=== Rugby ===
Radlett is the home of Tabard Rugby Football Club, established 1951, they play in London North West 2. The club has senior men's and women's teams as well as junior and mini rugby sections. There are two full size pitches, one of which is floodlit, and subsidiary pitches for junior rugby.

=== Tennis and Squash ===
Radlett Lawn Tennis & Squash Club is one of Hertfordshire's most successful and largest tennis and squash clubs with 11 tennis courts - eight of which are floodlit, and four glass back squash courts.

== Local groups and societies ==
Radlett has a number of local groups and societies. These include:

- Radlett Art Society
- Radlett Choral Society
- Radlett Horticultural Society
- Radlett Light Opera Society (now Radlett Musical Theatre Company)
- Radlett Music Club
- Radlett Players (amateur dramatics) (now Radlett Theatre Company)
- Radlett Rotary Club
- Radlett U3A
- The Radlett Society & Green Belt Association
- 1st Radlett Scouts
- 4th Radlett Scouts
- Radlett District Girlguiding
- Radlett and District Museum
- RARE: Radlett Action for Racial Equality

== Twinning ==
Radlett is twinned with Louveciennes, France and Lautertal, Germany.

== Notable people ==
Current:

- Jeff Wayne, Composer of Jeff Wayne's Musical Version of The War Of The Worlds.
- Brian Bennett and Hank Marvin of The Shadows
- Ted Childs the television producer, screenwriter and director, whose works include The Sweeney, Kavanagh QC, Soldier Soldier, Making Waves, Inspector Morse and its spin-off Lewis
- Pam St. Clement, actress
- Lacey Turner, EastEnders actress

Past:

- Alan Bush, British composer, pianist and conductor. Professor of Composition at the Royal Academy of Music from 1925 to 1978.
- Richard Baker, former BBC newsreader
- Émile Cammaerts, Belgian playwright, poet (including war poet) and author who wrote primarily in English and French
- Simon Cowell, English film, record, and television producer.
- Alan Hawkshaw, music composer and record producer
- Kirsty Hawkshaw, singer and songwriter
- Rosalind Hill, historian
- Duncan James, Blue singer
- Lauren, former Arsenal footballer
- George Michael, spent much of his teen years living with his parents on Oakridge Avenue
- Michael Michael, Britain's biggest criminal supergrass
- Barry Morgan, drummer with the band Blue Mink, lived in the Avenue
- Alison Moyet, singer, songwriter and performer
- John Rostill, bass guitarist with The Shadows
- Alex Song, former Arsenal footballer
- Kolo Touré, former Arsenal footballer
- Sir John Vane, Nobel Prize in Physiology or Medicine (1982). Lived in The Grove
- Dennis Wise, former Chelsea footballer
- David Ospina, Arsenal goalkeeper
- Harry Winks, Tottenham Hotspur F.C. midfielder
