= Potters Bar Brook =

River in Hertfordshire, England

Coordinates: 51°42′24″N 0°13′04″W

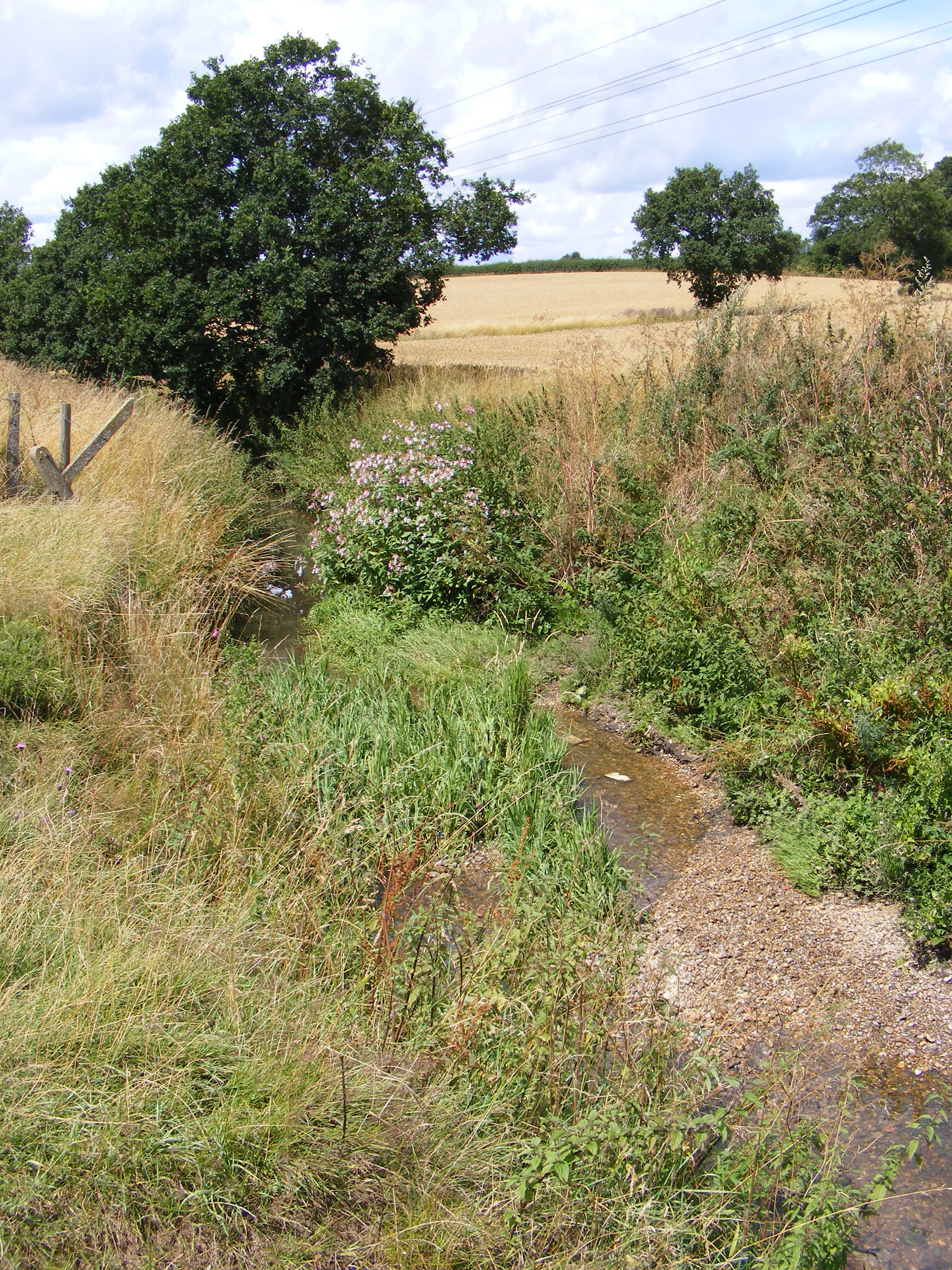
Potters Bar Brook near Warrengate Farm

Potters Bar Brook is a 3.3 km (2.0 mi) long stream (brook) in Hertfordshire, England, that is a tributary to the Mimmshall Brook.

Rising in the town of Potters Bar, Potters Bar Brook flows a northwesterly course through the former golf course Potters Bar Golf Club until flowing under the East Coast Main Line via a culvert. Then, it flows a westerly course through Warrengate Farm until flowing into Mimmshall Brook.
