= Tykes Water =

Stream in Hertfordshire, England

Coordinates: 51°42′08″N 0°19′47″W

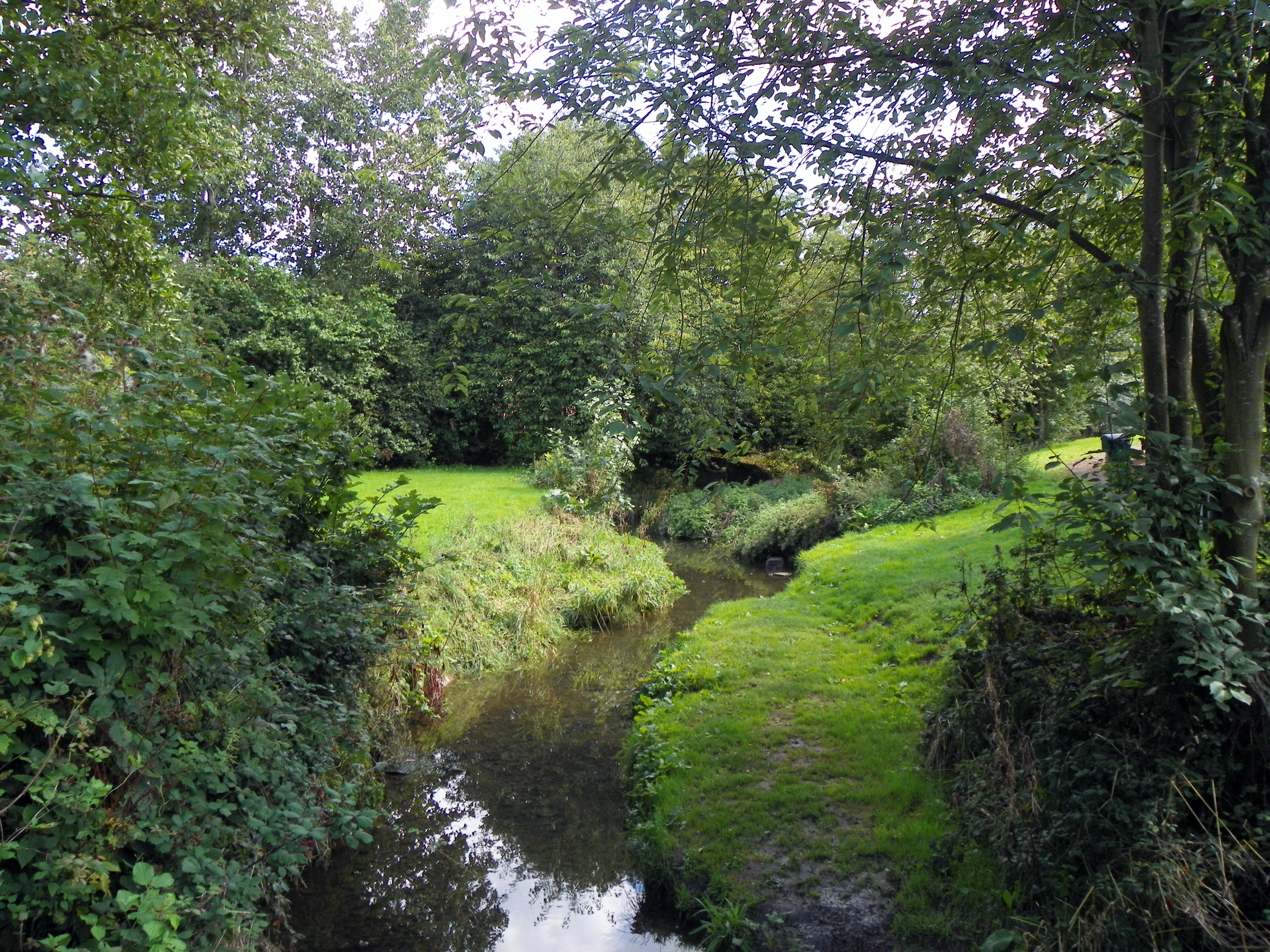
Tykes Water in Borehamwood.

Tykes Water is a minor tributary of the River Colne in Hertfordshire in England.

Its head waters are a network of drainage ditches west of the A41 near Bushey that feed into Aldenham reservoir. The outlet of the reservoir then flows north into the lake in Haberdashers' Aske's School grounds known as Tykes Water Lake. It then proceeds north to make a confluence with a secondary stream, also called Tykes Water, near Kendal Hall Farm.

The combined Tykes Waters flow through the centre of Radlett parallel to the railway and then flow north to join the River Colne near Colney Street. The lower part is also called The Brook.

The secondary Tykes Water, also known as Borehamwood Brook on some maps, rises to the south of Borehamwood near Yavneh College and runs north through the town, where it has been dammed to produce ornamental lakes in Aberford Park. It then runs north through open country.

A minor tributary collects water from farmland north of Borehamwood and also joins near Kendal Hall Farm.

Kitwells Brook joins the main stream just north of Radlett and drains land to the east in the direction of Shenley.

== In popular culture ==
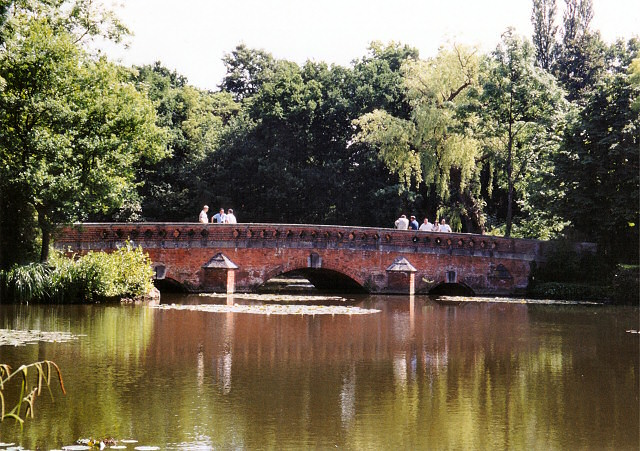
Tykes Water bridge crosses an artificial lake for ornamental effect. Tykes Water itself is only a few feet wide at this point. The bridge was used in the opening titles of the 1960s TV series The Avengers.

Tykes Water Bridge in the privately owned Aldenham Park, features in the opening credits of the Peter Cushing and Christopher Lee film, Dracula A.D. 1972, and is used in several episodes of the Diana Rigg and Linda Thorson series of The Avengers . Earlier, in 1966, it was used as the setting for the opening sequence of "The Saint" episode "Little Girl Lost" featuring Roger Moore.
