= Aldenham Reservoir =

Reservoir in Hertfordshire, England

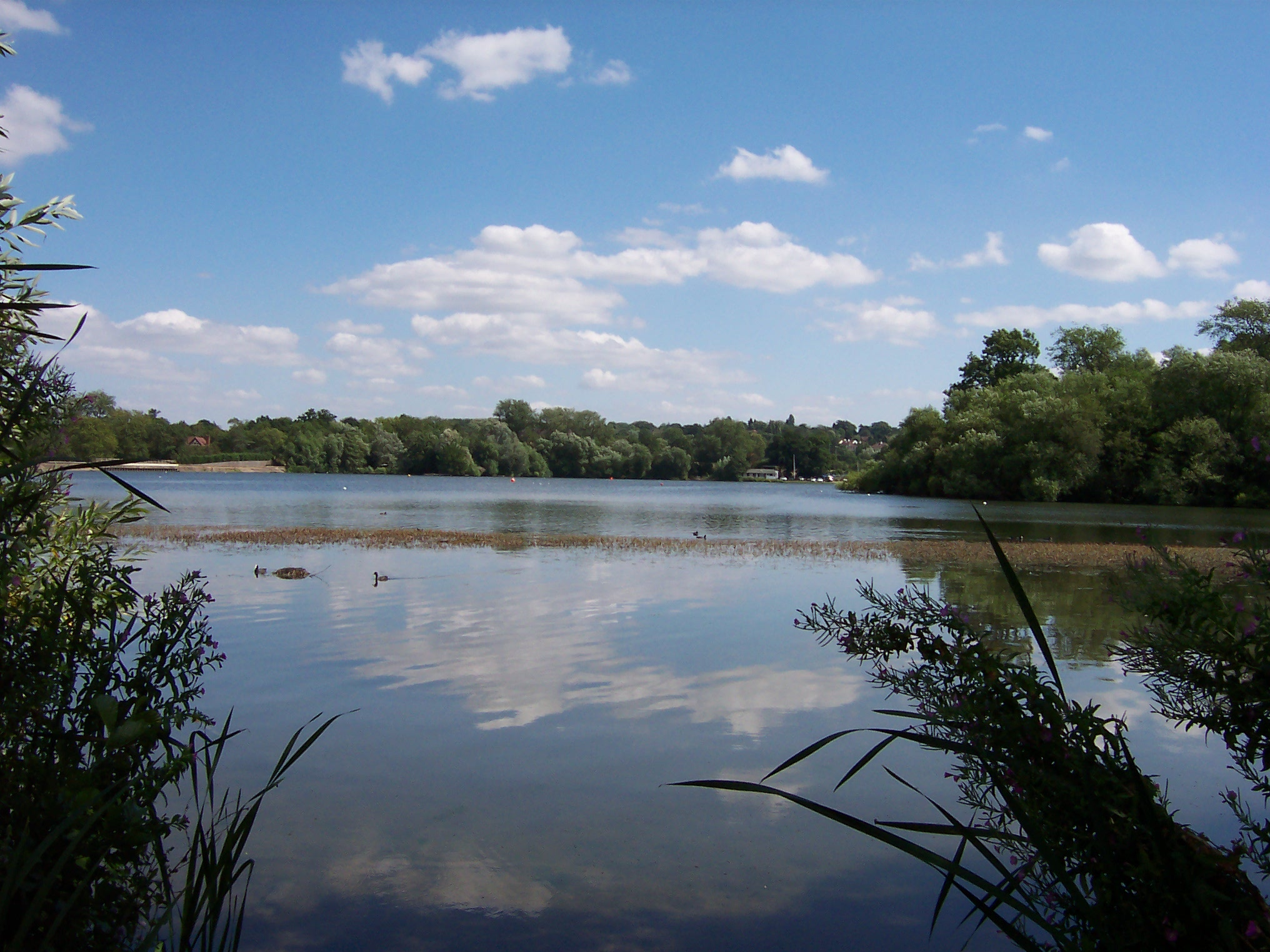
- Lake at Aldenham Country Park

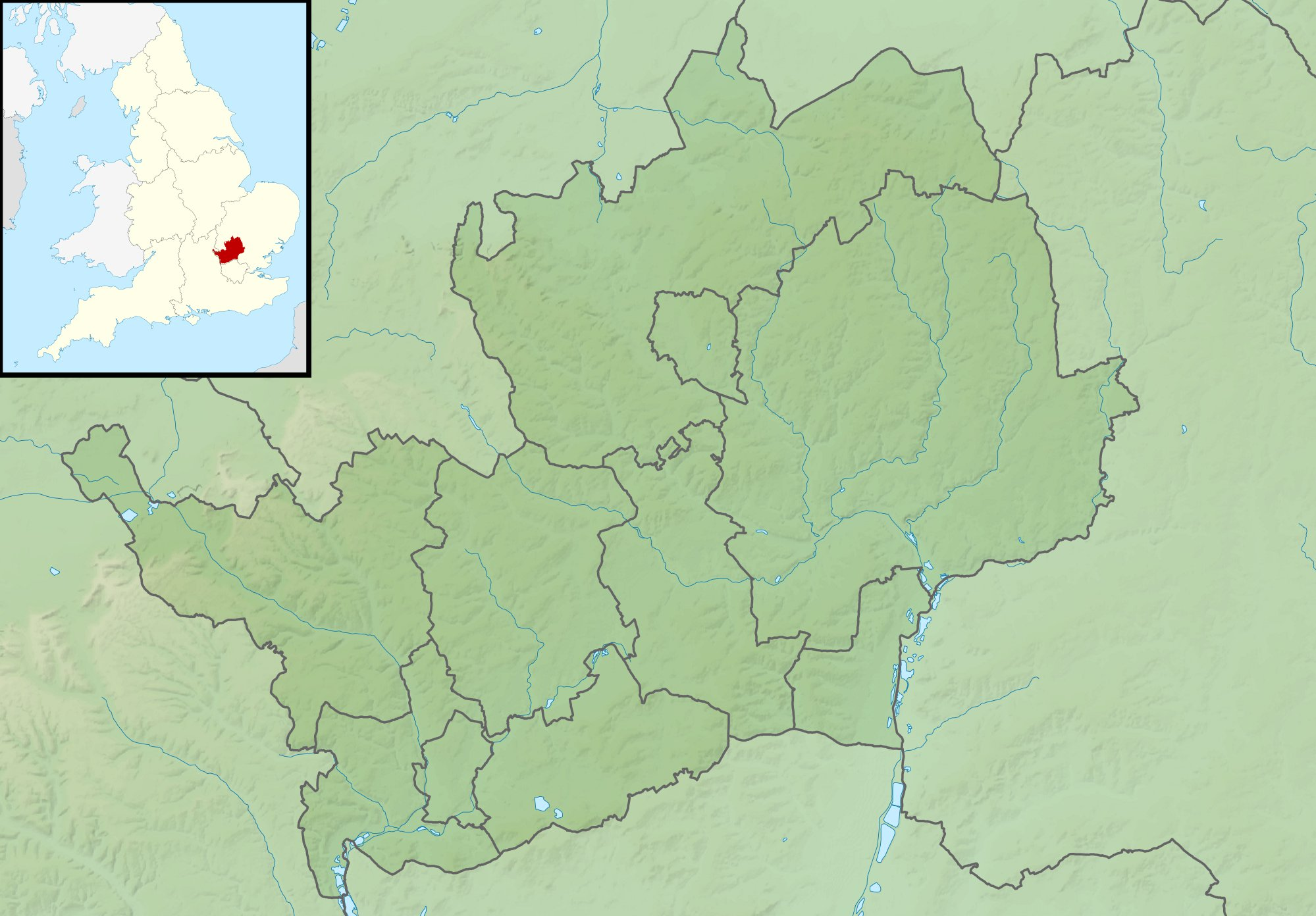
- Location within Hertfordshire Location within Elstree and Borehamwood
- Location: Hertfordshire
- Coordinates: 51°38′45″N 0°18′40″W
- Type: reservoir
- Basin countries: United Kingdom
- Surface area: 55 acres (220,000 m^{2})

Map showing the location of Aldenham Reservoir within Hertfordshire.

Aldenham Reservoir is situated in the parish of Elstree and Borehamwood in Hertfordshire, England, about one mile (1.6 km) to the west of the village of Elstree.

It is the source of the stream, Tykes Water, that runs north through Radlett.

== History ==
It was built between 1795 and 1797 by the Grand Junction Canal Company, to control the water levels in the River Colne following the construction of the Grand Junction Canal, and was hand dug by French prisoners of war.

An inspection report on the condition of the reservoir's dam in September 2019 revealed it to be a stable structure and in good condition, but requiring longer-term repair. Originally, the reservoir was 65 acres (260,000 m^{2}) in extent, but following repairs to the dam its surface area was reduced to 55 acres (220,000 m^{2}).

Since 1973 the reservoir has no longer been required for drinking water.

== Access ==
The reservoir has been used for recreational purposes, including fishing and sailing. However, following an inspection of the dam in 2019, the current owners dropped the water level to reduce pressure on the structure. The sailing club was, as a result, no longer able to sail, handed back its lease in 2020 and departed. This also raised questions about the future use of the reservoir. There have also been suggestions that public access will be reduced with the reservoir fenced off from Aldenham Country Park.

== See also ==
Nearby is the much larger Hilfield Park Reservoir, a nature reserve owned by Affinity Water.
