= Tyke (given name) =

Tyke is a masculine given name. Notable people with the name include:

- Tyke Peacock (born 1961), American high jumper
- Tyke Tolbert (born 1967), American football player and coach
