= Colney Street =

Hamlet in Hertfordshire, England

Coordinates: 51.70668°N 0.33131°W

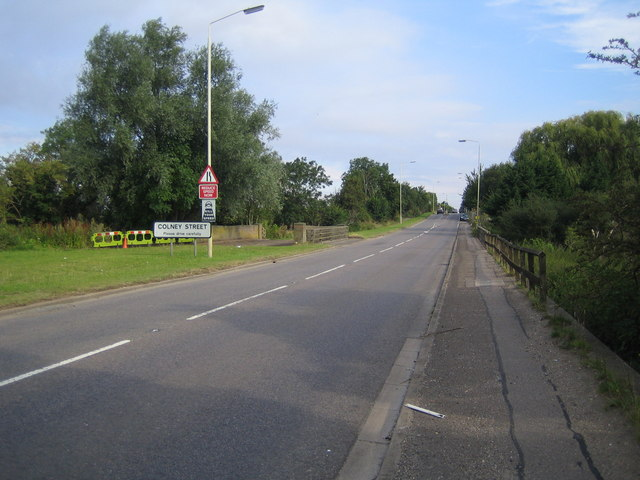
Colney Street:- Watling Street now the A5183 Radlett Road, but which used to be the A5 Watling Street. View at the southern approach to Colney Street. at Colneystreet Bridge which carries the road over the River Colne.

Colney Street is a hamlet in the English county of Hertfordshire.

It lies on the A5183 road, this was formerly the A5 road and, before that, Roman Britain's Watling Street. In addition its northern boundary is delineated by the M25 motorway. These location advantages have led to it becoming a primarily industrial and business area.

Colney Street was first recorded in Latin translation in 1275, and as Colneystrete in 1475. It takes its name from the River Colne, with the Old English suffix ēa, meaning "river", and the Middle English strete "Roman road", referring to Watling Street.

Colney Street forms part of the civil parish of St Stephen in the district of St Albans. At the 2011 Census the population of the hamlet was included in that of St. Stephen.

== See also ==
- Colney Heath
- London Colney
