= Elstree & Borehamwood railway station =

National Rail station in Hertfordshire, England

Elstree & Borehamwood
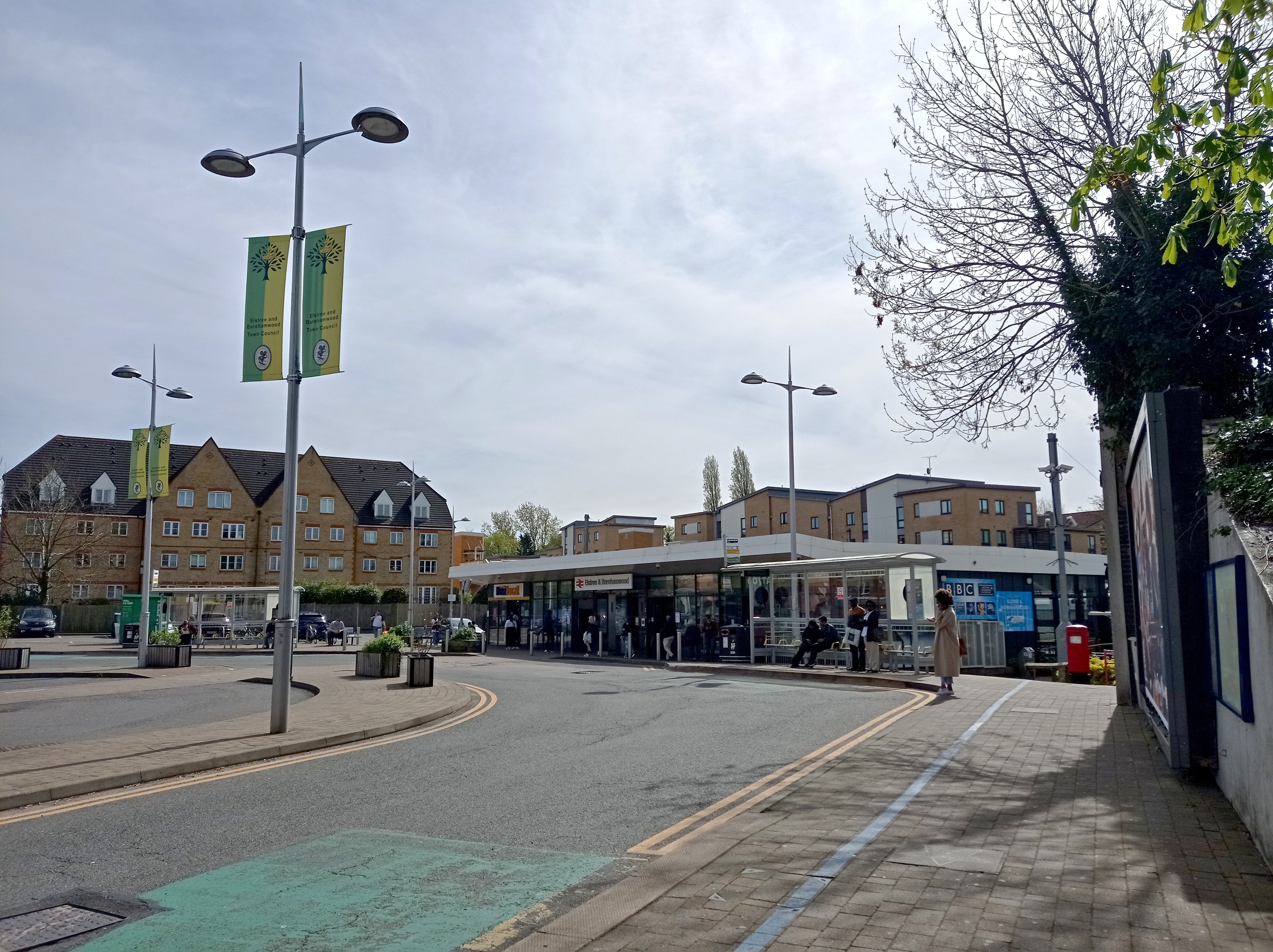
- Interactive map of Elstree & Borehamwood

General information
- Location: Borehamwood
- Local authority: Borough of Hertsmere
- Managed by: Thameslink
- Station code: ELS
- DfT category: E
- Number of platforms: 4
- Accessible: Yes
- Fare zone: 6

National Rail annual entry and exit
- 2020–21: ▼0.895 million
- 2021–22: ▲1.962 million
- 2022–23: ▲2.482 million
- 2023–24: ▲2.644 million
- 2024–25: ▲2.760 million

Key dates
- 13 July 1868: Opened as "Elstree"
- 1 June 1869: Renamed "Elstree and Boreham Wood"
- 1 April 1904: Renamed "Elstree"
- 21 September 1953: Renamed "Elstree and Borehamwood"
- 6 May 1974: Renamed "Elstree"
- 5 May 1988: Renamed "Elstree and Borehamwood"

Other information
- External links: Departures; Facilities
- Coordinates: 51.6531°N 0.2802°W

Elstree & Borehamwood railway station is located in the town of Borehamwood, in Hertfordshire, England; the nearby village of Elstree lies 1.3 miles (2.1 km) to the south-west. The station is a stop on the Midland Main Line, 12 miles 35 chains (20.0 km) down the line from London St Pancras; it is situated between Mill Hill Broadway to the south and Radlett to the north.

Elstree & Borehamwood is also the first station down the line that is located outside the Greater London area; however, it is within London fare zone 6. It is the only National Rail station within London fare zones 1–6, but also outside of London, to not be in Surrey.

The station is managed by Govia Thameslink Railway, which also operates services on the Thameslink route.

== History ==
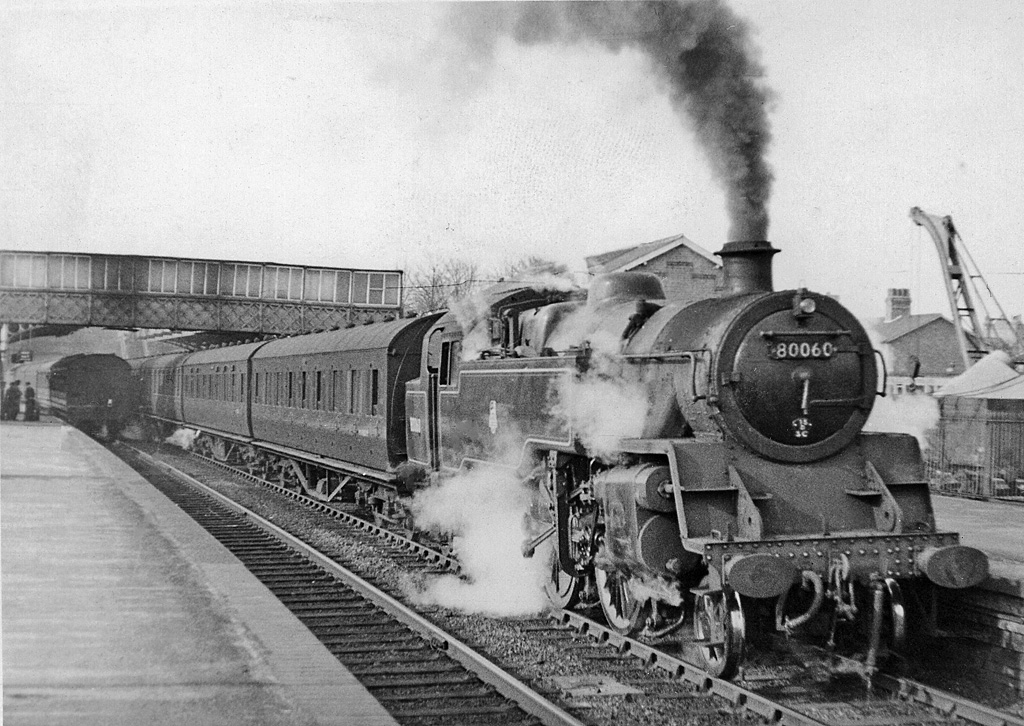
An up local train in 1954

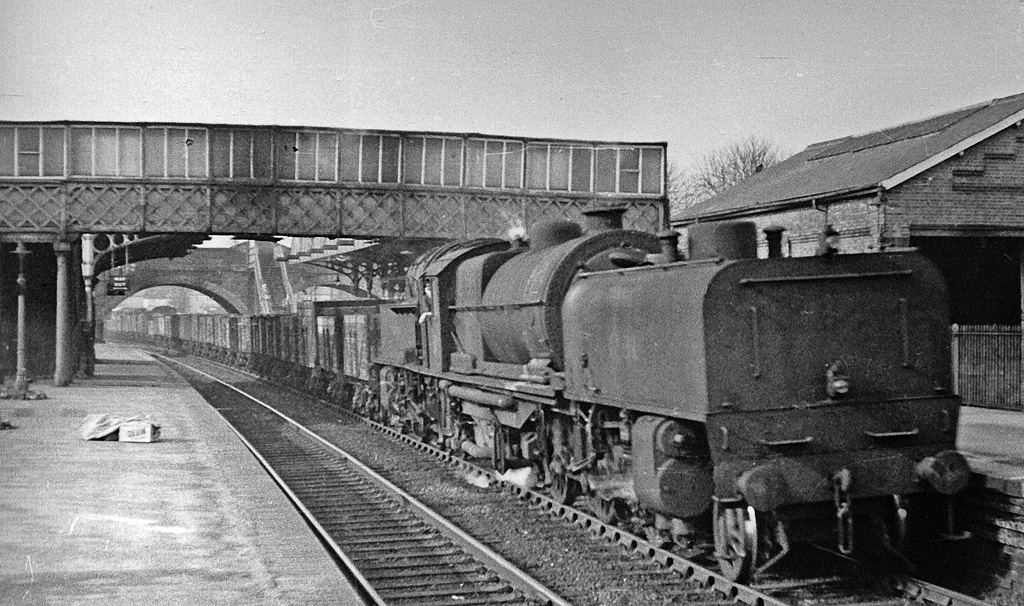
A Garratt on an up coal train in 1954

In 1862:

"The London and Midland Junction Railway Bill is here referred to as providing for a new line of Railway into the metropolis. It commences from the Midland Railway at Hitchin, passes by St. Albans, Elstree, Edgware, Finchley and Highgate, and terminates by a junction with the Metropolitan Underground Railway at King's Cross, previously throwing out a Branch to the Cattle Market at Copenhagen Fields."

On 22 June 1863, the Midland Railway (Extension to London) Bill was passed:

"An Act for the Construction by the Midland Railway Company of a new Line of Railway between London and Bedford, with Branches therefrom; and for other Purpose".

Situated north of the Elstree Tunnels, it was built by the Midland Railway as simply "Elstree" in 1868 when it built its extension to St Pancras station. By the 1920s, it had been renamed Elstree and Boreham Wood station. It was modernised in 1959. The station was renamed from Elstree & Borehamwood to Elstree on 6 May 1974, but reverted to Elstree & Borehamwood by mid 1988.

A new footbridge and step-free lifts, installed under Network Rail's Access for All programme, opened on 1 October 2014 in order to make Elstree & Borehamwood entirely step-free.

== Services ==
All services at Elstree & Borehamwood are operated by Thameslink, using Class 700 electric multiple units.

The typical off-peak service in trains per hour is:

- 6 tph to St Albans City of which 2 continue to Luton
- 2 tph to Rainham via Dartford
- 4 tph to Sutton (2 of these run via Mitcham Junction and 2 run via Wimbledon)

During peak hours, the station is served by additional services between Luton and Orpington via Catford, as well as some late evening services to and from Bedford.

The station is also served by a night service between Bedford and Three Bridges on Sunday to Friday nights.

Preceding station	National Rail	Following station
Radlett	Thameslink Thameslink	Mill Hill Broadway

== See also ==
- Elstree South tube station - unbuilt London Underground station

== Gallery ==
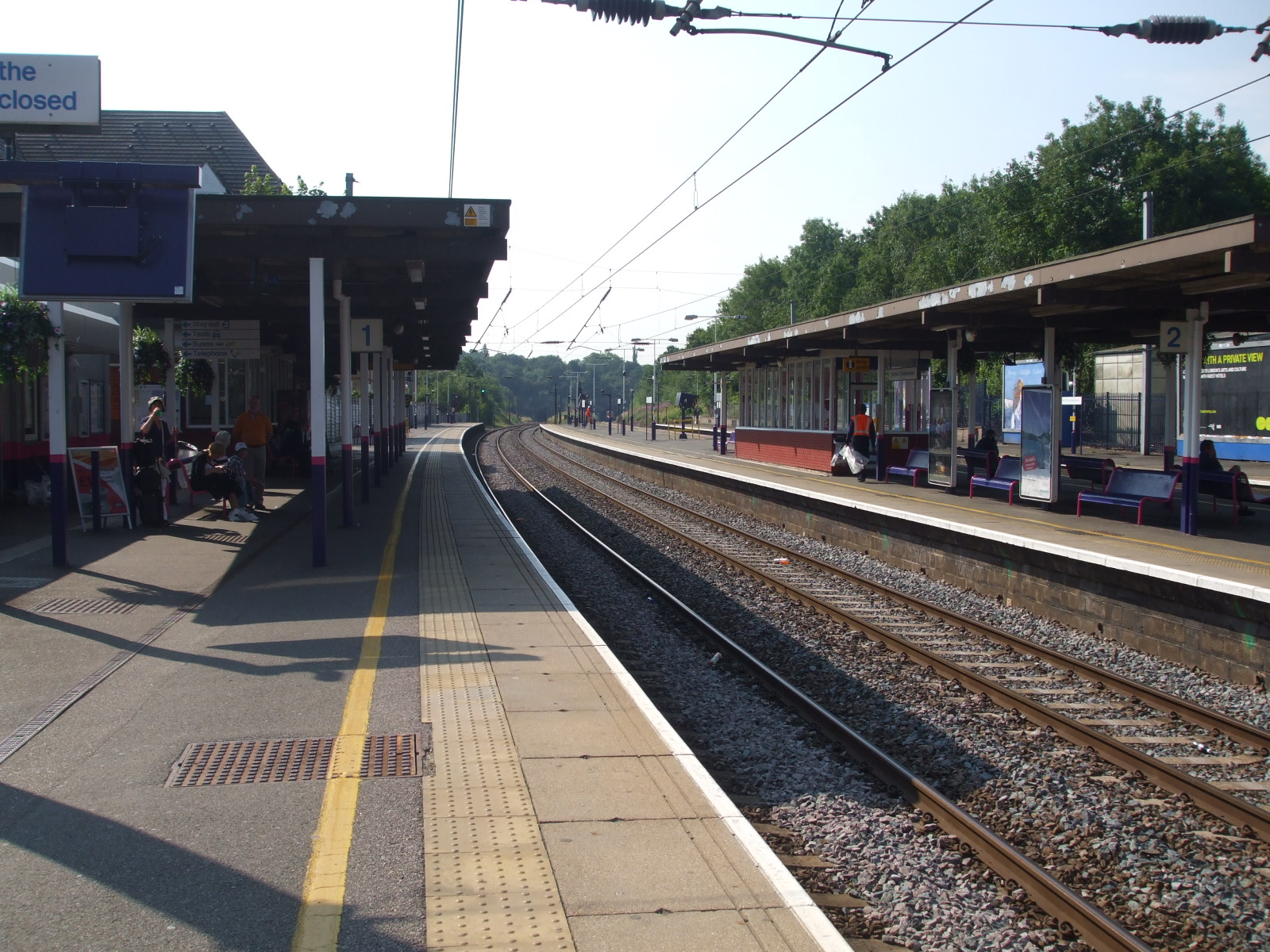
Slow platform 1 looking south

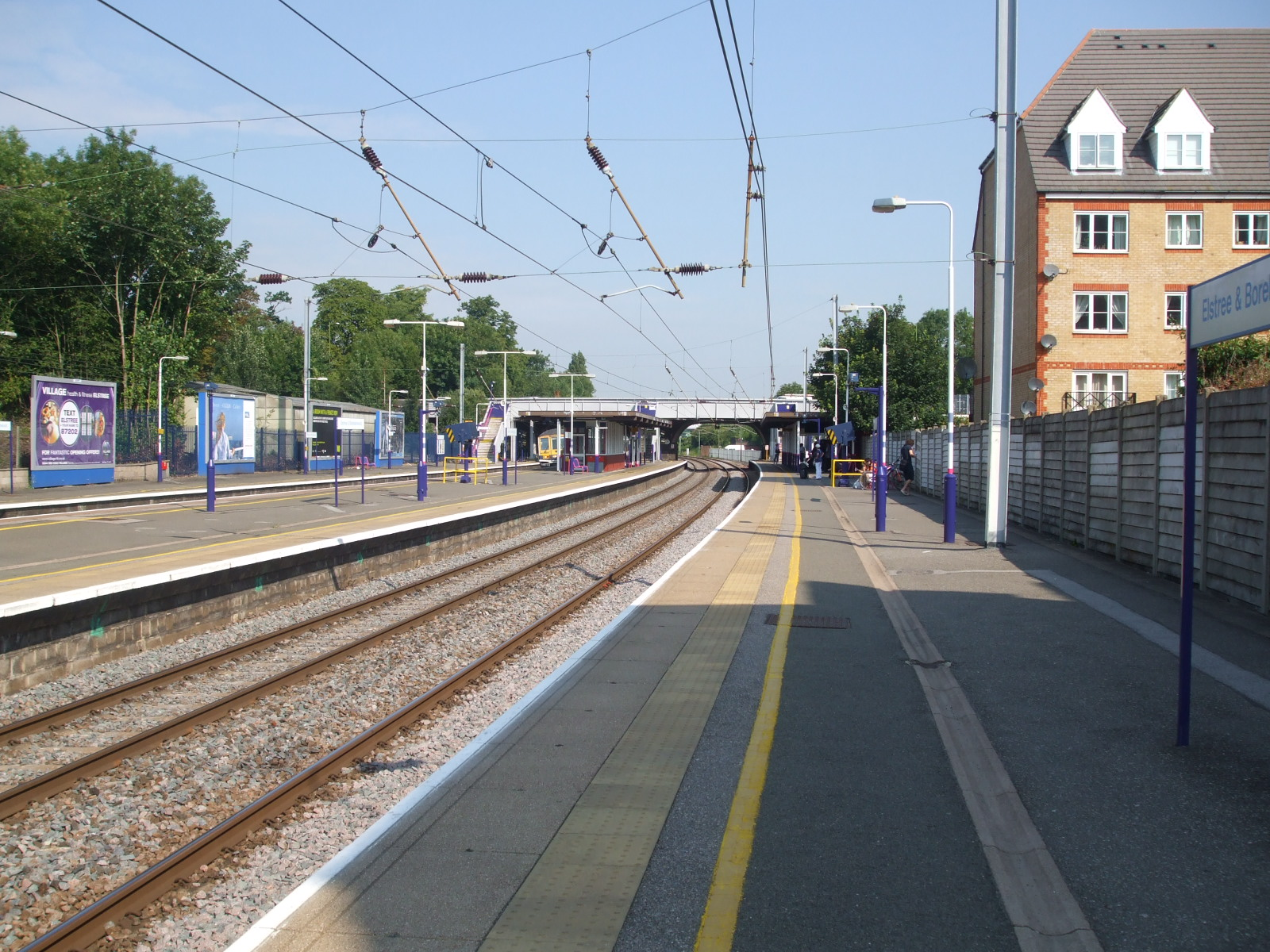
Slow platform 1 looking north

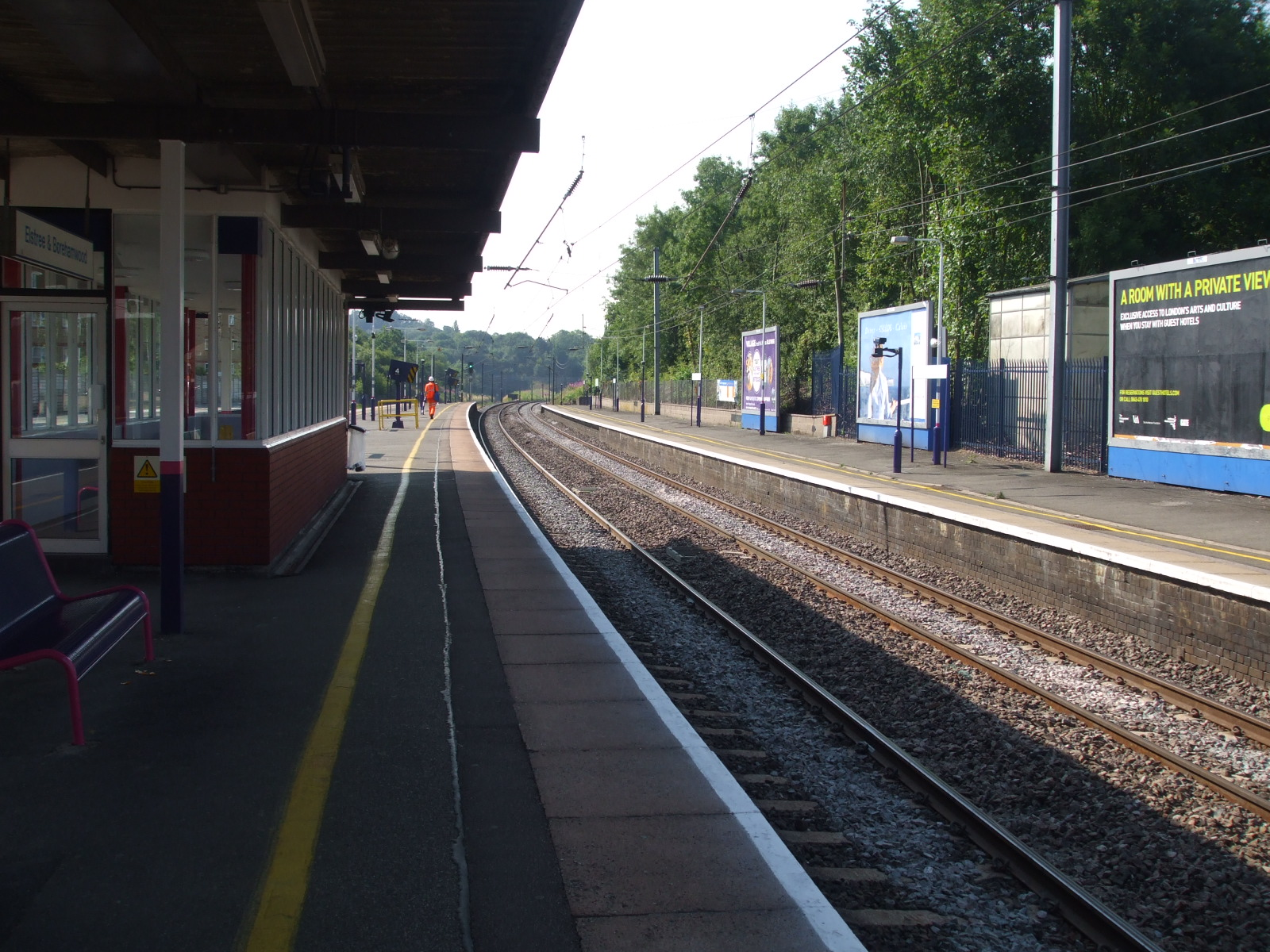
Fast platform 3 looking south

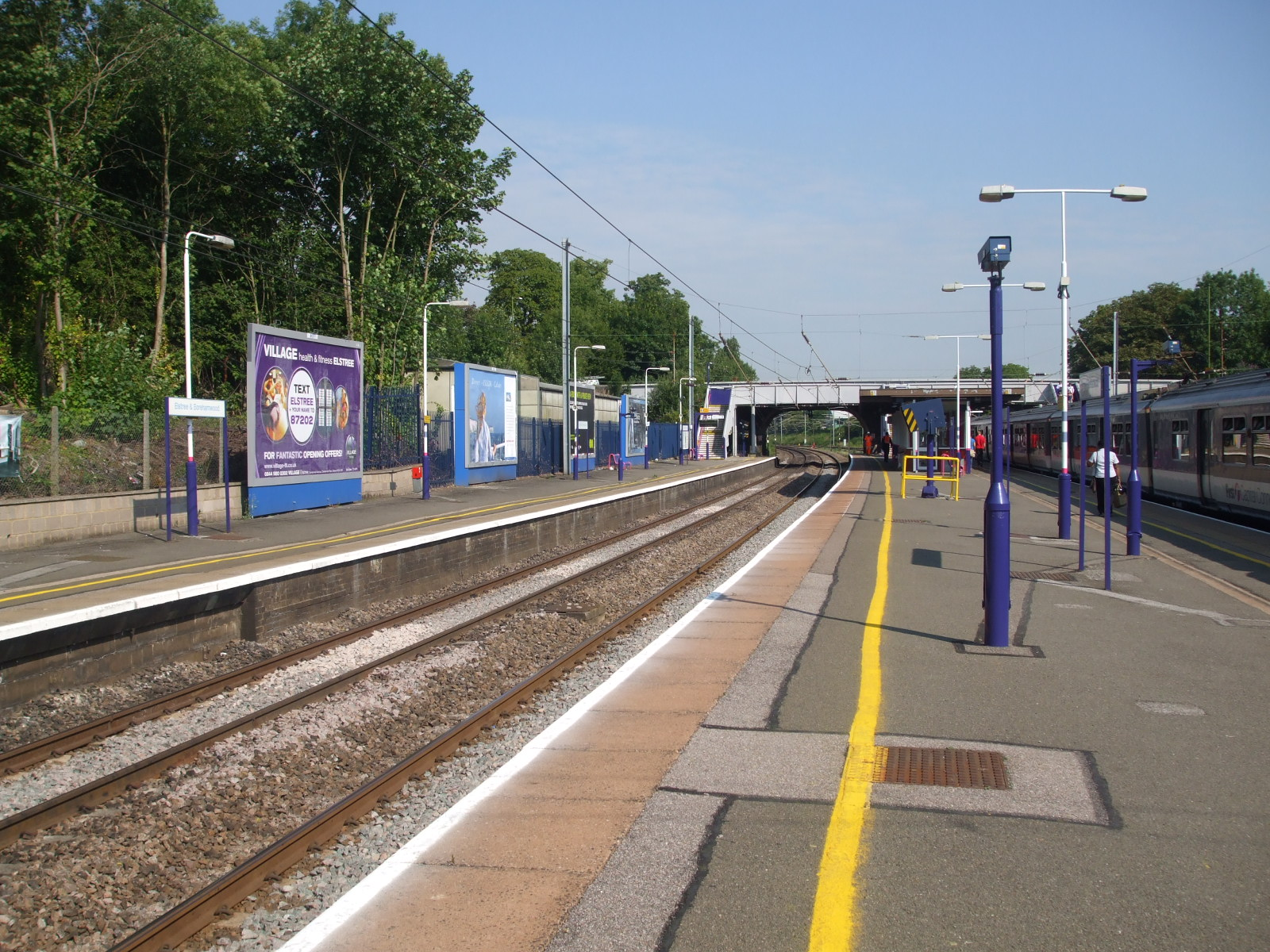
Fast platform 3 looking north

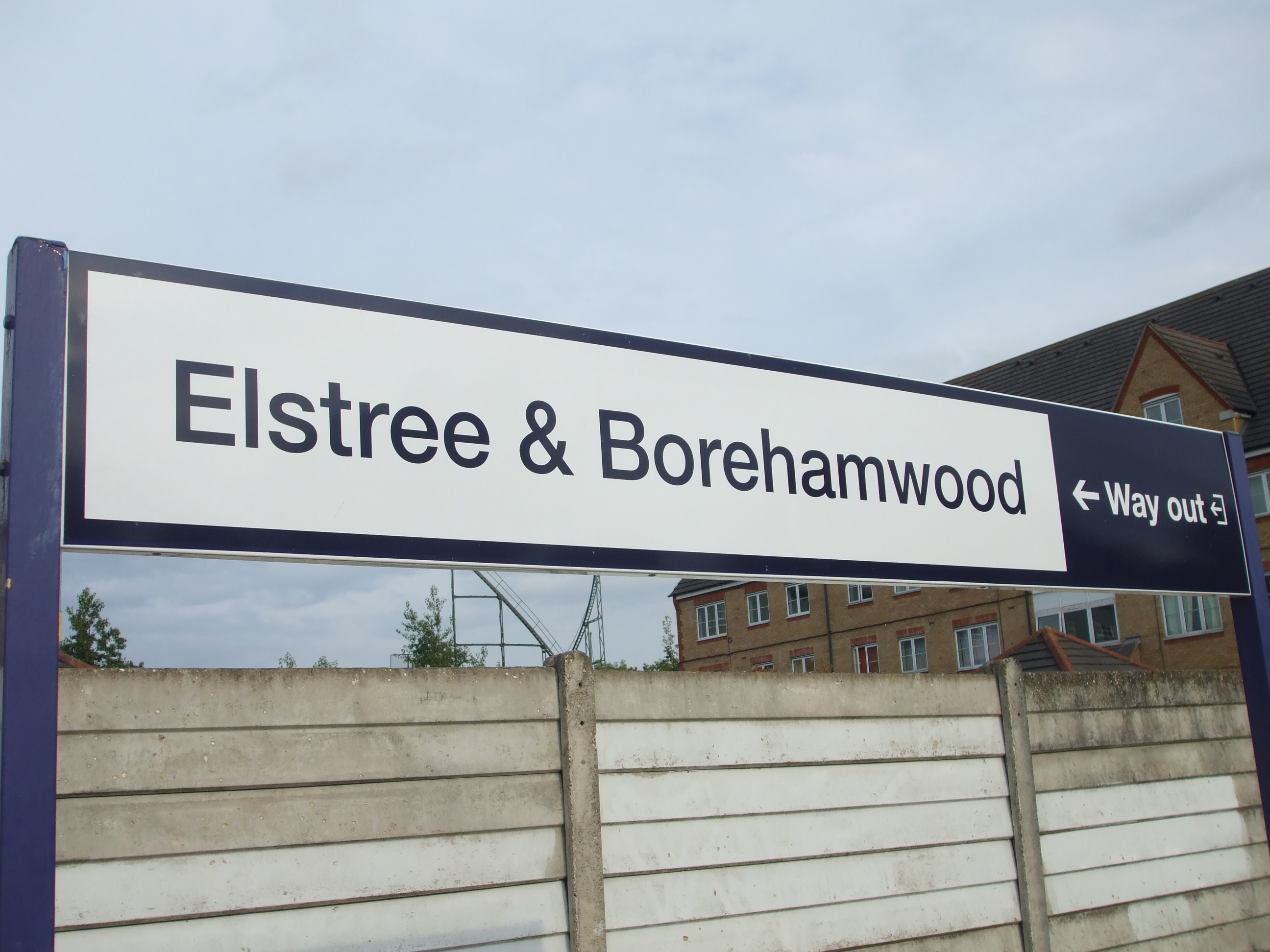
Platform signage

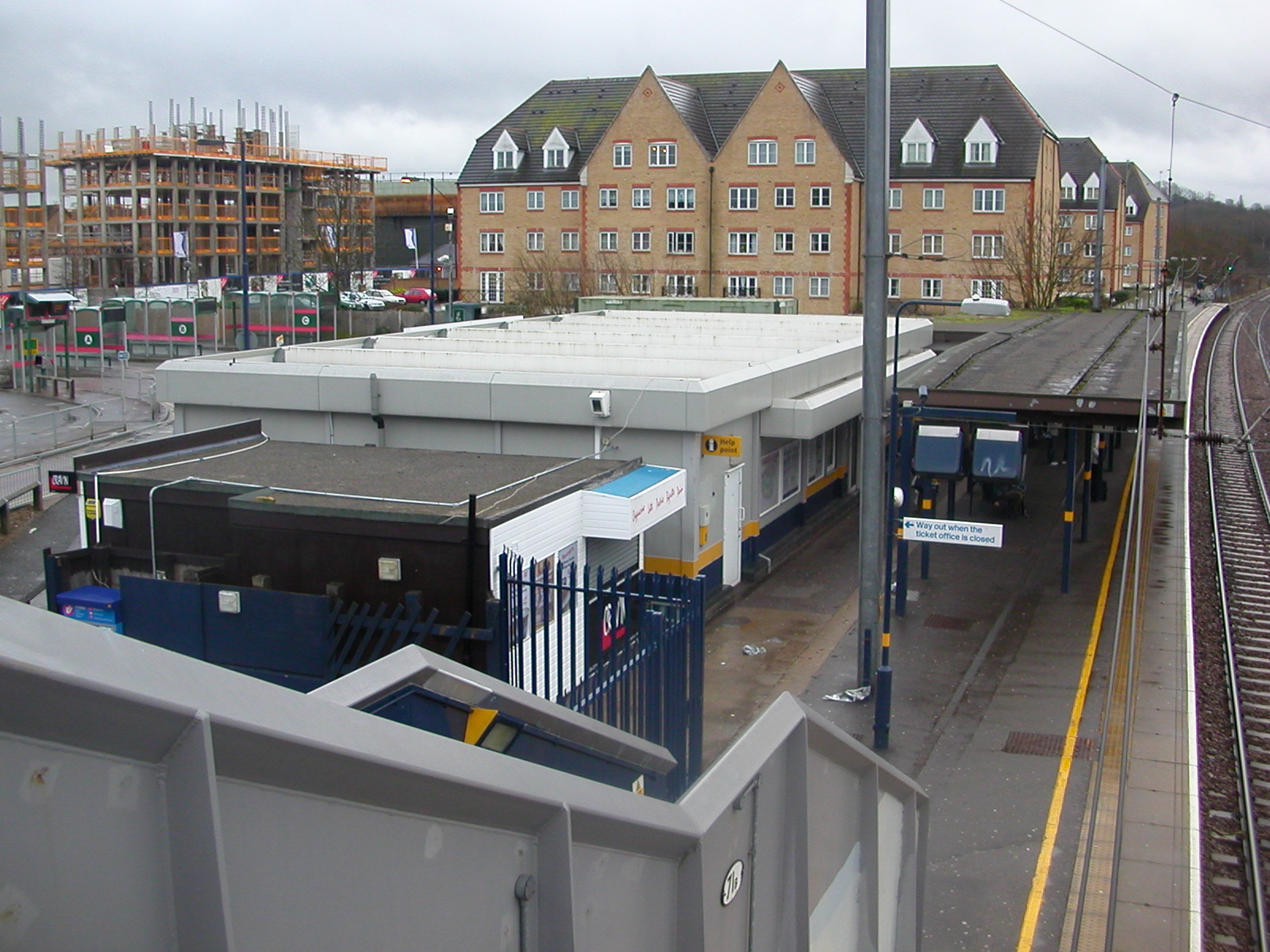
Main building on Platform 1, with a snack bar in the foreground

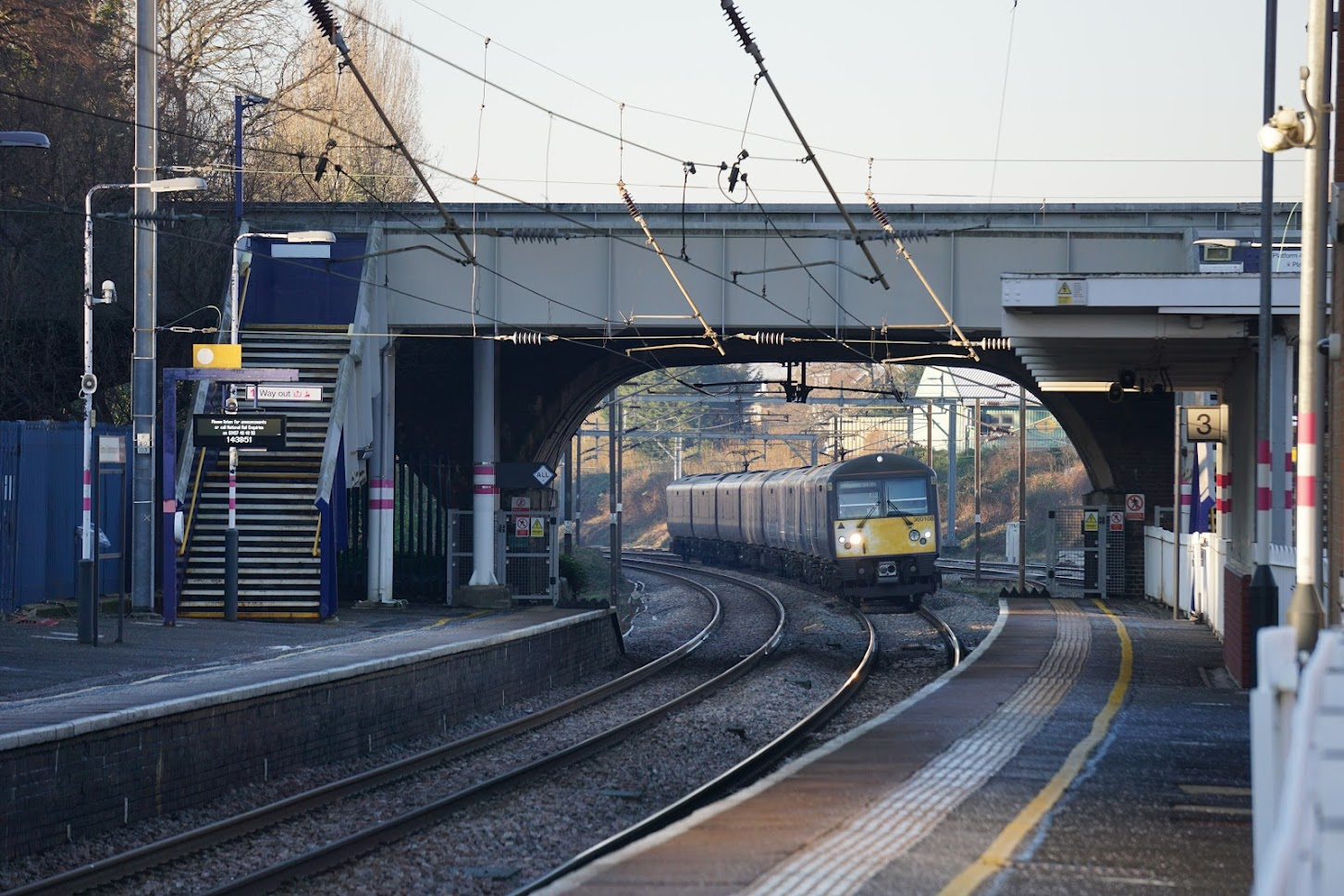
A passing service operated by East Midlands Railway approaching platform 3 from the north
