= British Indians =

British people of Indian descent

Indians in the United Kingdom (British Indians)
- Distribution by local authority in the 2011 census.

Total population
- United Kingdom: 1,927,150 – 2.9% (2021/22 Census); England: 1,843,248 – 3.3% (2021); Scotland: 52,951 – 1.0% (2022); Wales: 21,070 – 0.7% (2021); Northern Ireland: 9,881 – 0.5% (2021)

Regions with significant populations
- London; Leicester; Birmingham; Sandwell; Swindon; Leeds; Wolverhampton; Coventry; Slough; Greater Manchester

Languages
- English; Hindustani; Languages of India

Religion
- Predominantly Hinduism (42.8%) and Sikhism (20.6%); minority follows Islam (13.2%), Christianity (12.3%) and other faiths (2.3%) (Note: Including Buddhism (0.2%), Judaism (0.03%), Jainism, Ravidassia, Baháʼí Faith, Zoroastrianism and others.) or are irreligious (4.6%); 2021 census, NI, England and Wales only

British Indians are citizens of the United Kingdom (UK) whose ancestral roots are from India. Currently, the British Indian population exceeds 2 million people in the UK, making them the single largest visible ethnic minority population in the country. They make up the largest subgroup of British Asians and are one of the largest Indian communities in the Indian diaspora, mainly due to the Indian–British relations (including historical links such as India having been part of the British Empire and still being part of the Commonwealth of Nations). The British Indian community is the sixth largest in the Indian diaspora, behind the Indian communities in the United States, Saudi Arabia, the United Arab Emirates, Malaysia and Nepal. The majority of British Indians are of Punjabi and Gujarati origin with various other smaller communities from different parts of India including Kerala, West Bengal, Bihar and Uttar Pradesh.

== History ==
Among the first Indians to travel to the United Kingdom was a young boy called Peter Pope. The boy was given by a commander of a Dutch ship on its way to Myanmar to the British sailor, Thomas Best in 1612. The boy was brought to England in 1614 where he was placed under the care of Patrick Copland who was a chaplain and who subsequently taught him to read and write in English. His education in England was paid for by the East India Company.

Under Patrick Copland's recommendation, the boy was baptised on 22 December 1616 and given the name of "Peter" which was given by King James I. A few months after his baptism, he returned to India with Copland to "convert some of his own nation".

=== 18th–19th centuries ===
People from India have been travelling to Great Britain since the East India Company (EIC) recruited lascars to replace vacancies in their crews on East Indiamen whilst on voyages in India. Initially, these were men from the Indo-Portuguese or Luso-Asian communities of the subcontinent, including men from Bombay, Goa, Cochin, Madras and the Hugli River in Bengal. Later men from Ratnagiri were hired. Some of them were then unable to obtain passage back due to the price and had no alternative than to settle in London. There were also some ayahs, domestic servants and nannies of wealthy British families, who accompanied their employers back to Britain when their stay in South Asia came to an end. British soldiers would also sometimes marry Indian women and send their children back to Britain, although the wife often did not accompany them. Indian wives of British soldiers would sometimes ask for passage home after being divorced or widowed if they did accompany their children. In 1835, the husband (a British soldier serving in His Majesty's 1st Foot Regiment) of Bridget Peter, a native of Madras, died. She petitioned the Directors from Chelsea Hospital 'in a state of destitution' to pay for her return to India. They agreed to pay to return her and her three children.

The Navigation Act 1660 restricted the employment of non-English sailors to a quarter of the crew on returning East India Company ships. Baptism records in East Greenwich suggest that a small number of young Indians from the Malabar Coast were being recruited as house servants at the end of the 17th century, and records of the EIC also suggest that Indo-Portuguese cooks from Goa were retained by captains from voyage to voyage. In 1797, 13 were buried in the parish of St Nicholas at Deptford.

During the 19th century, the East India Company brought thousands of Indian lascars, scholars and workers to Britain largely to work on ships and in ports. It is estimated 8,000 Indians (a proportion being lascar sailors) lived in Britain permanently prior to the 1950s. Due to the majority of early Asian immigrants being lascar seamen, the earliest Indian communities were found in port towns. Naval cooks also accompanied them.

The first Western-educated Indian to travel to Europe and live in Britain was I'tisam-ud-Din, a Bengali Muslim cleric, munshi and diplomat to the Mughal Empire who arrived in 1765 with his servant Muhammad Muqim during the reign of King George III. He wrote of his experiences and travels in his Persian book, Shigurf-nama-i-Wilayat (or 'Wonder Book of Europe'). This is also the earliest record of literature by a British Indian. Also during the reign of George III, the hookah-bardar (hookah servant/preparer) of James Achilles Kirkpatrick was said to have robbed and cheated Kirkpatrick, making his way to England and stylising himself as the Prince of Sylhet. The man was waited upon by the prime minister of Great Britain William Pitt the Younger, and then dined with the Duke of York before presenting himself in front of the King.

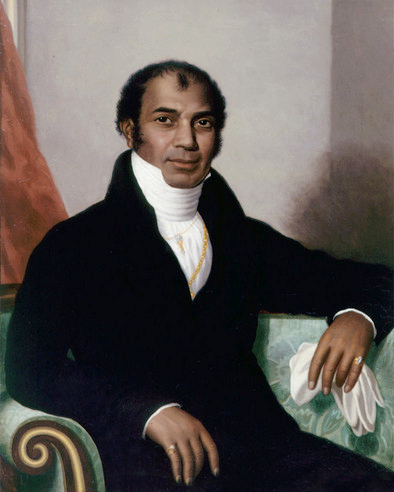
Sake Dean Mahomed, one of the early Indians to settle in the United Kingdom

One of the most famous early Indian immigrants to Britain was Sake Dean Mahomet, a captain of the British East India Company and a native of Patna in the Indian state of Bihar. In 1810, he founded London's first Indian restaurant, the Hindoostanee Coffee House. He is also valued for introducing shampoo and therapeutic massage to the United Kingdom. Another early Indian to settle in the United Kingdom was the Mughal noblewoman of Purnea in Bihar, Elizabeth Sharaf un-Nisa, who married into the aristocratic Ducarel family and moved to the United Kingdom in 1784 where she lived until 1822 when she died in Newland, Gloucestershire.

In July 1841, David Ochterlony Dyce Sombre, an Anglo-Indian born in India, became the first person of Indian descent to be elected to British Parliament. He was the member of Parliament for Sudbury but was later removed in April 1842 due to allegations of bribery.

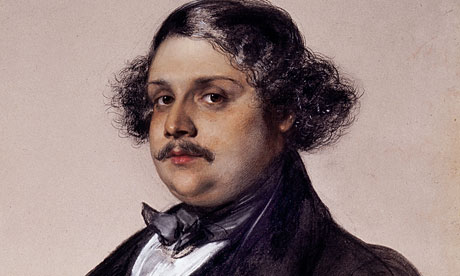
David Ochterlony Dyce Sombre, the first member of British Parliament of Indian descent

Between 1600 and 1857, some 20-40,000 Indian men and women of all social classes had travelled to Britain, the majority of them being seamen working on ships. Lascars lodged in British ports in between voyages. Most Indians during this period would visit or reside in Britain temporarily, returning to India after months or several years, bringing back knowledge about Britain in the process.

=== 20th century ===
In the early twentieth century, some Indian nationalists, such as Sukhsagar Datta came to Britain because they feared arrest in India itself and hoped to propagate the cause of Indian Independence. This group went on to found the India League in England in 1928, under the leadership of V. K. Krishna Menon.

The 1931 Census of India estimated that there were at least 2,000 Indian students in English and Scottish Universities at the time, from an estimated, and overwhelmingly male population of 9,243 South Asians on the British mainland, of which 7,128 resided in England and Wales, two thousand in Scotland, with a thousand in Northern Ireland, and 1 on the Isle of Man. Their origins were recorded as:

Indian population of Great Britain by region of birth, 1931
| | England and Wales | | | Northern Ireland | | | Scotland | | |
| Region of birth | Total | Male | Female | Total | Male | Female | Total | Male | Female |
|---|---|---|---|---|---|---|---|---|---|
| Bengal | 2,229 | 2,189 | 40 | - | - | - | 615 | 614 | 1 |
| Bombay | 929 | 851 | 78 | - | - | - | 261 | 257 | 4 |
| Madras | 382 | 342 | 40 | - | - | - | 84 | 79 | 5 |
| Punjab | 1,088 | 1,062 | 26 | - | - | - | 374 | 374 | - |
| Other provinces | 1,867 | 1,779 | 88 | - | - | - | 357 | 353 | 4 |
| Unspecified | 634 | 621 | 13 | 1,003 | 485 | 518 | 312 | 309 | 3 |
| India | 7,179 | 6,844 | 285 | 1,003 | 485 | 518 | 2,003 | 1986 | 17 |

| Year | British Indian Population |
|---|---|
| 1931 (estimate) | 10,186 |
| 1932 (estimate) | 7,128 |
| 1951 (estimate) | 31,000 |
| 1961 (estimate) | 81,000 |
| 1971 (estimate) | 375,000 |
| 1981 (estimate) | 676,000 |
| 1991 (census) | 840,000 |
| 2001 (census) | 1,053,411 (1.79%) |
| 2011 (census) | 1,451,862 (2.30%) |
| 2021 (census) | 1,843,248 |

In 1932, the Indian National Congress survey of "all Indians outside India" (which included modern Pakistani and Bangladeshi territories) estimated that there were 7,128 Indians living in the United Kingdom, which included students, lascars, and professionals such as doctors. The resident Indian population of Birmingham was recorded at 100 by 1939. By 1945 it was 1,000.

Following the Second World War and the breakup of the British Empire, Indian migration to the UK increased through the 1950s and 1960s. This was partly due to the British Nationality Act 1948, which enabled migration from the Commonwealth with very few limits. In 1950 there were probably fewer than 20,000 non-white residents in Britain, almost all born overseas. The Commonwealth Immigrants Act 1962 and Immigration Act 1971 largely restricted any further primary immigration, although family members of already-settled migrants were still allowed. In addition, much of the subsequent growth in the British Indian community has come from the births of second- and third-generation Indian Britons.

Although post-war immigration was continuous, several distinct phases can be identified:

- Workers were recruited to fulfill the labour shortage that resulted from World War II. These included Anglo-Indians who were recruited to work on the railways as they had done in India.
- Workers mainly from the Bengal, Punjab and Gujarat regions arrived from India in the late 1950s and 1960s. Many worked in the foundries of the English Midlands. Large numbers of Gujaratis worked in the textile manufacturing sector in the northwest industrial towns of Blackburn, Dewsbury, Bolton, Lancaster, Manchester and Preston. Sikhs coming to London either migrated to the East to set up businesses where the wholesale, retail and manufacturing elements of the textile industry were located. Many Sikhs also moved to West London and took up employment at Heathrow airport and the associated industries and in the plants and factories of major brands such as Nestle around it.
- During the same period, medical staff from India were recruited for the newly formed National Health Service. These people were targeted as the British had established medical schools in the Indian subcontinent which conformed to the British standards of medical training.
- During the 1960s and 1970s, large numbers of East African Indians, predominantly Gujaratis but also sizeable numbers of Punjabis who already held British passports, entered the UK after they were expelled from Kenya, Uganda and Zanzibar. Many of these people had been store-keepers and wholesale retailers in Africa and opened shops when they arrived in the UK. In 2001 East African Indians made up 16% of the total British Indian population.
- After Brexit, EU nationals working in the health and social care sector were replaced by migrants from non-EU countries such as India. About 250,000 people came from India in 2023.

== Demographics ==
British Indians by region and country
| Region / Country | 2021 (Note: 2021/22: England and Wales, Scotland, and Northern Ireland) | | 2011 (Note: 2011: England and Wales, Scotland, and Northern Ireland) | | 2001 (Note: 2001: England and Wales, Scotland, and Northern Ireland) | | 1991 (Note: 1991: Great Britain. Northern Ireland did not record ethnic group data in the 1991 census.) | |
| Region / Country | Number | % | Number | % | Number | % | Number | % |
|---|---|---|---|---|---|---|---|---|
| England | 1,843,248 | 3.26% | 1,395,702 | 2.63% | 1,028,546 | 2.09% | 823,821 | 1.75% |
| —Greater London | 656,272 | 7.46% | 542,857 | 6.64% | 436,993 | 6.09% | 347,091 | 5.20% |
| —West Midlands | 276,030 | 4.64% | 218,439 | 3.90% | 178,691 | 3.39% | 158,731 | 3.08% |
| —South East | 241,537 | 2.60% | 152,132 | 1.76% | 89,219 | 1.12% | 64,888 | 0.87% |
| —East Midlands | 229,831 | 4.71% | 168,928 | 3.73% | 122,346 | 2.93% | 98,859 | 2.50% |
| —North West | 140,413 | 1.89% | 107,353 | 1.52% | 72,219 | 1.07% | 55,823 | 0.83% |
| —East of England | 136,974 | 2.16% | 86,736 | 1.48% | 51,035 | 0.95% | 39,292 | 0.78% |
| —Yorkshire and the Humber | 81,322 | 1.48% | 69,252 | 1.31% | 51,493 | 1.04% | 40,752 | 0.84% |
| —South West | 58,847 | 1.03% | 34,188 | 0.65% | 16,394 | 0.33% | 10,915 | 0.24% |
| —North East | 22,021 | 0.83% | 15,817 | 0.61% | 10,156 | 0.40% | 7,470 | 0.29% |
| Scotland | 52,951 (Note: Scotland held its census a year later after the rest of the United Kingdom due to the COVID-19 pandemic. As a result, data shown is for 2022 as opposed to 2021.) | 0.97% | 32,706 | 0.62% | 15,037 | 0.30% | 10,050 | 0.20% |
| Wales | 21,070 | 0.68% | 17,256 | 0.56% | 8,261 | 0.28% | 6,384 | 0.23% |
| Northern Ireland | 9,881 | 0.52% | 6,198 | 0.34% | 1,567 | 0.09% | —N/a | —N/a |
| United Kingdom | 1,927,150 | 2.88% | 1,452,156 | 2.30% | 1,053,411 | 1.79% | 840,255 (Note: Figures are for Great Britain only, i.e. excludes Northern Ireland) | 1.53% |

=== Population ===
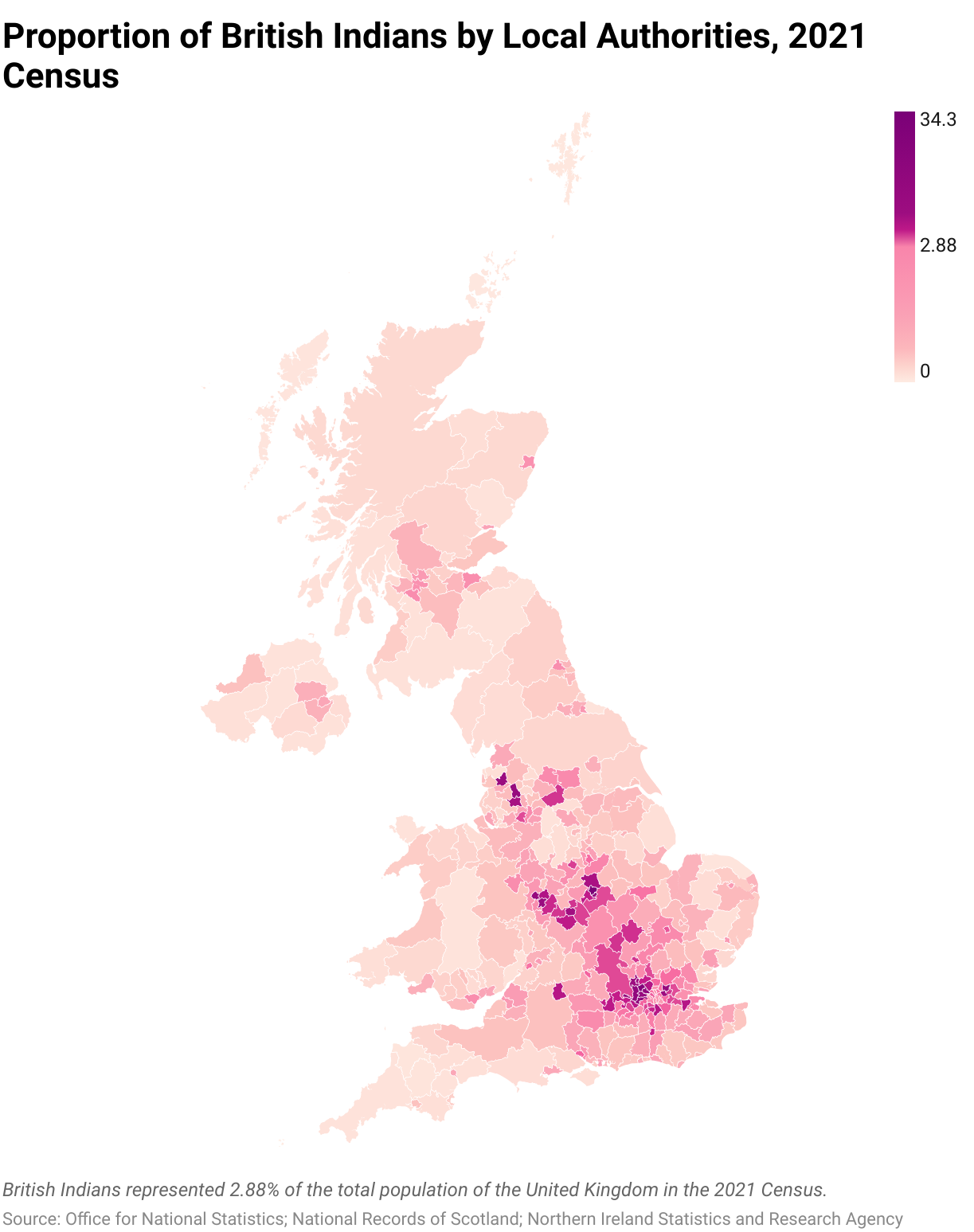
Distribution of British Indians by local authority, 2021 census

Population pyramid of Asian or Asian British Indians in 2021 (in England and Wales)

In the 2021 Census, 1,864,318 people in England and Wales were recorded as having Indian ethnicity, accounting for 3.1% of the population. In Northern Ireland, the equivalent figure was 9,881, or 0.5% of the population. The census in Scotland was delayed for a year and took place in 2022, with a population of 52,951 representing 1.0% of the population.

The city or district with the largest population by 'Indian' ethnicity outside the capital, according to the 2021 census in England and Wales, was Leicester (pop. 126,421), followed by Birmingham (66,519), Sandwell (44,378), Wolverhampton (42,052), Coventry (32,096), Slough (30,209), Bolton (26,238), Blackburn with Darwen (24,389), Buckinghamshire (24,181) and Kirklees (22,739). Many of these are however outnumbered by nine London boroughs, namely Harrow, Brent, Hounslow, Hillingdon, Ealing, Redbridge, Newham, Barnet and Croydon. On a proportion basis, the top ten local authorities were: Leicester (34.30%), Harrow (28.62%), Oadby and Wigston (21.11%), Hounslow (21.11%), Brent (19.47%), Slough (19.06%) Hillingdon (18.74%), Redbridge (16.50%), Wolverhampton (15.95%) and Blackburn with Darwen (15.76%). In Scotland, the highest proportion was in East Renfrewshire at 2.44%; in Wales, the highest concentration was in Cardiff at 2.44%; and in Northern Ireland, the highest concentration was in Belfast at 1.26%.

The 2011 United Kingdom census recorded 1,451,862 residents of Indian ethnicity, accounting for 2.3 per cent of the total UK population (not including those of mixed ethnic backgrounds). The equivalent figure from the 2001 Census was 1,053,411 (1.8 per cent of the total UK population).

People born in India are the UK's largest foreign-born population, totalling an estimated 880,000 in 2020. According to the 2011 census, the cities with the most Indian-born residents are London (262,247), Leicester (37,224), Birmingham (27,206) and Wolverhampton (14,955).

=== Ethnicity ===
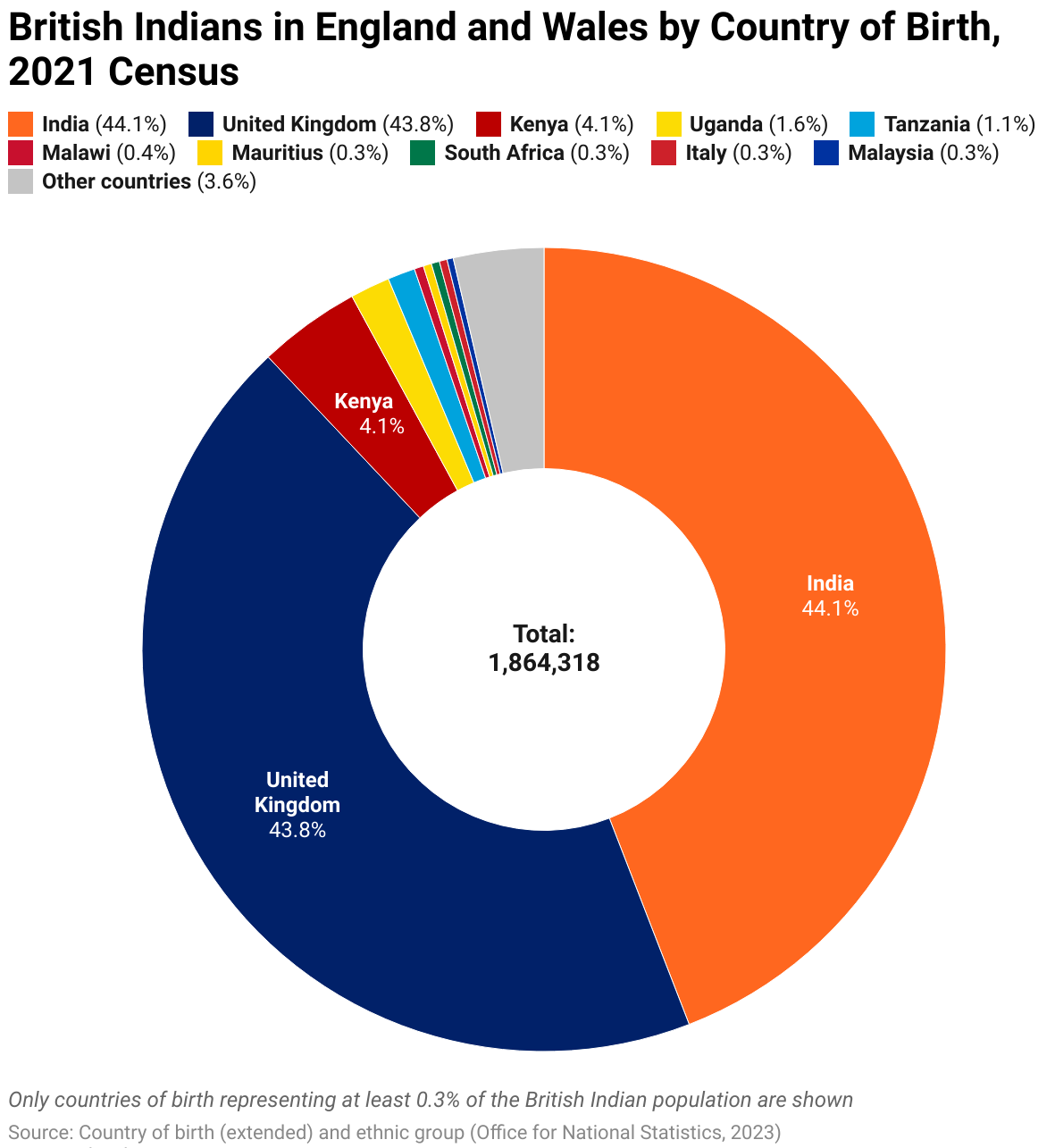
Country of birth (2021 census, England and Wales)

Year of arrival (2021 census, England and Wales)
1. Born in the UK (43.8%)
2. Before 1950 (0.20%)
3. 1951 to 1960 (0.70%)
4. 1961 to 1970 (6.00%)
5. 1971 to 1980 (7.20%)
6. 1981 to 1990 (3.30%)
7. 1991 to 2000 (4.30%)
8. 2001 to 2010 (13.5%)
9. 2011 to 2021 (21.0%)

In the 2001 UK Census, Indians in the UK were most likely to have responded to code 41 - Indian or Indian British. Indian was one of only five sub categories in the UK census which represents a nation (along with Irish, Pakistani, Bangladeshi, Chinese, Vietnamese).

India is a diverse nation composed of many ethnic groups. This is reflected in the British Indian community although there are several ethnic groups that number considerably more than others. Gujaratis account for 45 percent of Indians living in the UK while the Indian Punjabi account for another 45 per cent of Indians living in the UK, based on data for England and Wales. There is a large community of Goans in Swindon, with smaller communities in Hayes, Romford and Cranford. There are significant numbers of British Indians originating from Karnataka, Kerala, Andhra Pradesh and Odisha.

=== Population distribution ===
The table below shows the distribution of British Indians people in the United Kingdom. The figures for all countries, regions, cities and boroughs are based on the 2011 census. 42.9% of people from the Indian ethnic group were born in the UK. 41.9% were born in Southern Asia and 11.1% were born in South and Eastern Africa (for example, Uganda, Kenya and Tanzania). Indian people born in South and Eastern Africa were more clustered than those born in the UK or Southern Asia, with 11.0% living in Harrow and 10.6% living in Leicester.

Indian population in the United Kingdom countries and regions
| Region | Population of region | Indian population | Percentage of total population | Significant communities |
|---|---|---|---|---|
| London | 8,799,725 | 656,272 | 7.5% | Harrow - 28.6% Hounslow - 21.1% Brent - 19.5% Hillingdon - 18.7% Redbridge - 16.5% Ealing - 14.9% Newham - 11.0% |
| West Midlands | 5,950,757 | 276,030 | 4.6% | Wolverhampton - 15.9% Sandwell - 13.0% Coventry - 9.3% Walsall - 8.0% Birmingham - 5.8% Solihull - 5.2% Warwickshire - 4.9% |
| South East | 9,278,063 | 241,537 | 2.6% | Slough - 19.1% Wokingham - 7.0% Windsor and Maidenhead - 6.4% Reading - 6.2% Milton Keynes - 5.3% Buckinghamshire - 4.4% |
| East Midlands | 4,880,054 | 229,831 | 4.7% | Leicester - 34.3% Leicestershire - 5.9% Derby - 4.8% Nottingham - 3.6% West Northamptonshire - 2.3% North Northamptonshire - 2.0% |
| East | 6,335,068 | 136,974 | 2.2% | Bedford - 5.4% Luton - 5.4% Hertfordshire - 4.0% Peterborough - 3.3% Thurrock - 2.3% |
| North West | 7,417,398 | 140,413 | 1.9% | Blackburn with Darwen - 15.8% Bolton - 8.9% Trafford - 4.3% Manchester - 2.7% Lancashire - 2.0% |
| Yorkshire and the Humber | 5,480,774 | 81,322 | 1.5% | Kirklees - 5.2% Bradford - 2.6% Leeds - 2.6% Sheffield - 1.2% |
| South West | 5,701,186 | 58,847 | 1.0% | Swindon - 7.6% Bristol - 1.8% South Gloucestershire - 1.7% |
| North East | 2,647,014 | 22,021 | 0.8% | Newcastle Upon Tyne - 2.4% Middlesbrough - 1.9% Darlington - 1.0% |
| Scotland | 5,295,403 | 32,706 | 0.6% | Glasgow - 1.5% Aberdeen - 1.5% Edinburgh - 1.4% |
| Wales | 3,107,494 | 21,070 | 0.7% | Cardiff - 2.4% Newport - 1.3% Swansea - 0.9% |
| Northern Ireland | 1,810,863 | 6,198 | 0.1% | Belfast - 0.8% |

=== Communities ===
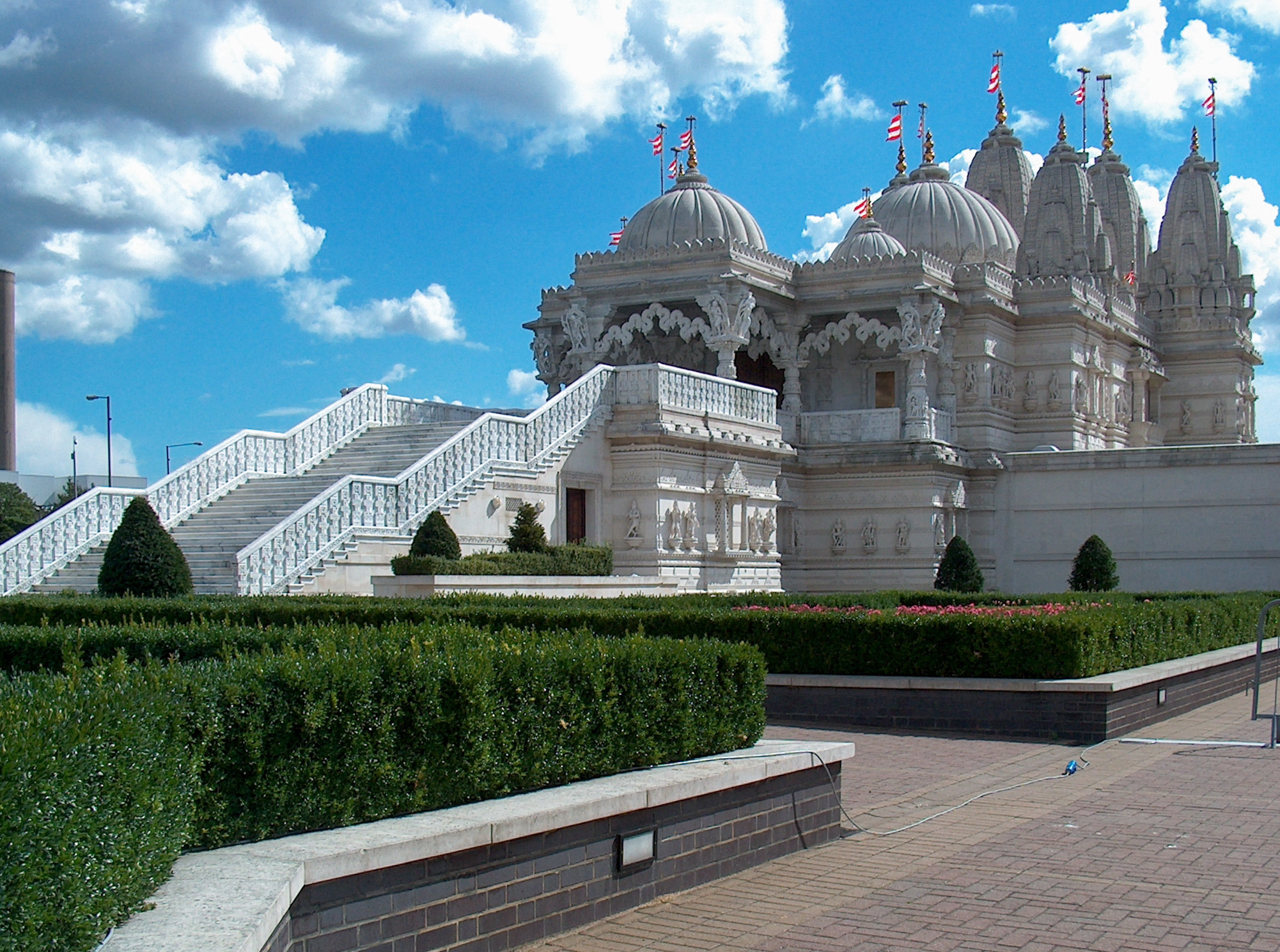
The BAPS Shri Swaminarayan Mandir London is one of the largest Hindu temples in the world outside India

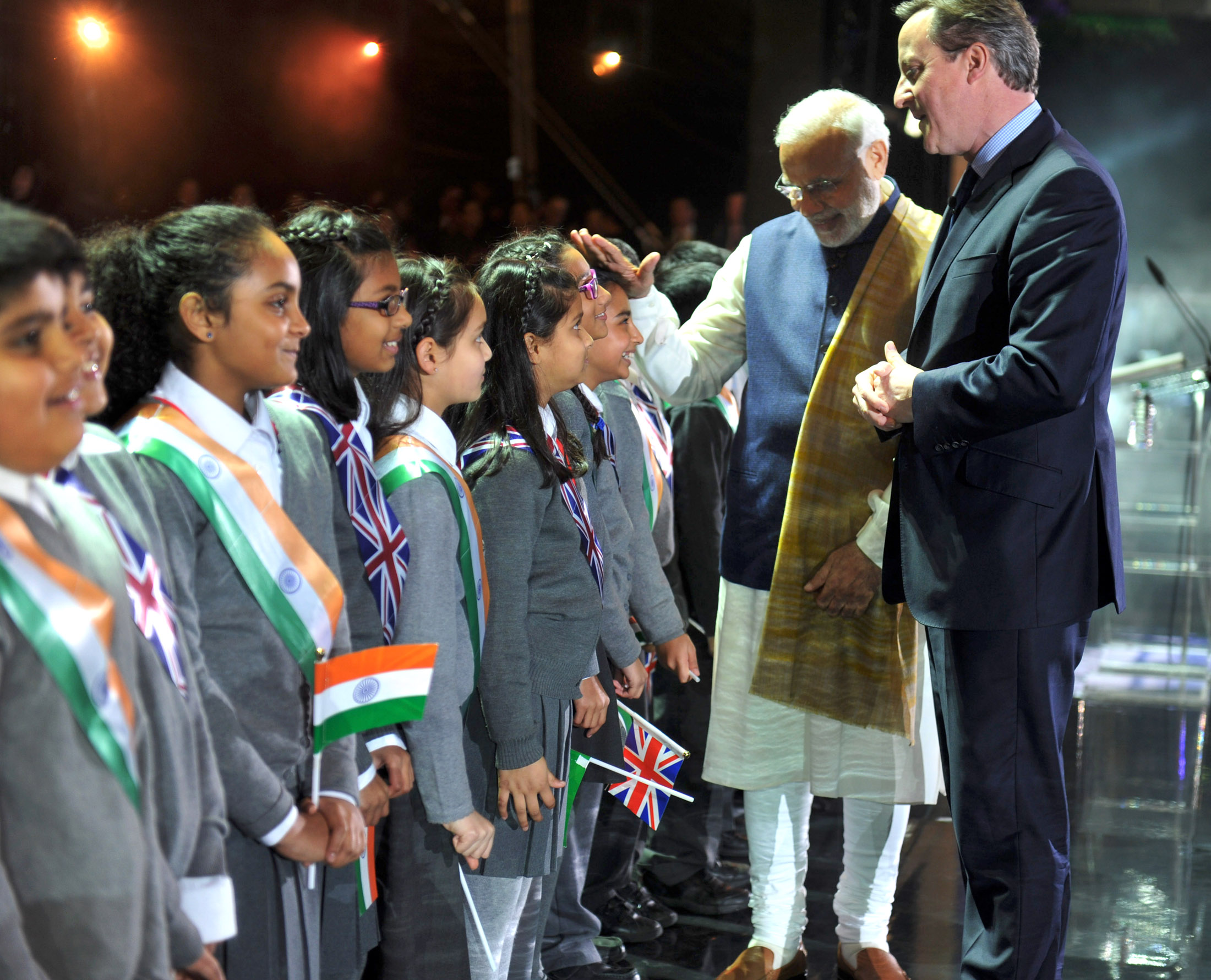
Indian prime minister Narendra Modi meets British Indian children in London in 2015

==== London ====
Indians number over half a million in Greater London, which is the county's single largest non-white ethnic group. Indians have a significant impact on the culture of the British capital. Within London, Southall, Hounslow, Brent, Croydon, Ealing, Barnet, Tooting, Harrow and Wembley, the latter of which is one of the few places outside India where Indians make up the largest ethnic group (almost 4 times larger than the White British population). There are more Indians in the British capital than in the Netherlands, Germany, France, Italy and Portugal combined. The Indian Overseas Congress UK is an organisation of the Indian diaspora in the UK, affiliated to the Indian National Congress (Congress (I)), and formed in 1969.

==== Leicester ====
As of 2021, Leicester is now one of the UK's ethnic and religious minority-majority cities and Indians make up by far the largest ethnic group besides the White British, others include Birmingham and Luton. At 18.7% of the local population in 2009, Leicester has one of the highest percentages of Indians per head of the population of any local authority in the UK. According to the 2001 UK Census, 14.74% of Leicester's population were Hindu and 4.21% Sikh. Gujarati is the primary language of 16% of the city's residents, 3% Punjabi and 2% Urdu. Other smaller but common language groups include Hindi and Bengali.

==== Birmingham ====
Most Indians live in west Birmingham in areas such as Handsworth. Punjabi is the most spoken Indian language in Birmingham with some Urdu and Bengali speakers.

==== Slough ====
Slough has the largest Sikh community in the UK as a borough, with about 11 percent of the people in Slough being Sikhs. There is also has a large Hindu population, (7 percent) and a significant Muslim population from India. The most common non-English languages in Slough are Punjabi and Polish (with both at 6 percent), followed by Urdu with a bit of Bengali, Hindi and Tamil.

==== Wolverhampton ====
Wolverhampton is home to the second largest Sikh community after Slough - 9.1 percent of the population are Sikhs. Hindu communities can be found; 3.0 percent are Hindus. The most spoken language among Indians in Wolverhampton is Punjabi, followed by Gujarati. The majority of the Indians in the city live in South Wolverhampton but are scattered almost everywhere.

==== Overseas territories ====
There are Indian communities in the UK's overseas territories, such as the communities in Gibraltar, the Cayman Islands, Virgin Islands, Anguilla and Montserrat. The majority of the community in Gibraltar originated in Hyderabad in Sindh, and came as merchants after the opening of the Suez Canal in 1870; many others migrated as workers after the closure of the frontier with Spain in 1969 to replace Spanish ones.

=== Religion ===
Although the plurality of British Indians are Hindu, the UK is home to the second largest Sikh community outside India. Notable Hindu temples include London Sri Murugan Temple, London Sri Mahalakshmi Temple East Ham, BAPS Shri Swaminarayan Mandir London, Bhaktivedanta Manor, Shree Jalaram Prarthana Mandal, Skanda Vale, Sree Ganapathy Temple, Wimbledon and Tirupathy Balaji Temple (Birmingham). Notable Gurdwaras in the country include: Gurdwara Sri Guru Singh Sabha, Guru Nanak Gurdwara Smethwick and Guru Nanak Nishkam Sevak Jatha. There are also significant numbers of Muslim and Christian British Indians as well as Ravidassia community with their main temple (Bhawan) in Handsworth, Birmingham. One of the largest Christian British Indian community is that of Catholic Goans, mainly from East Africa, but also directly from Goa, and from Aden, Pakistan and the countries of the Persian Gulf. The UK is also home to one of the largest Ravidassia communities outside India; this was first recognised by 2011 Census. According to the 2021 census of England and Wales, there were close to 800,000 Indians who identified as Hindus and just over 385,000 who identified as Sikh.

| Religion | England and Wales | | | |
| Religion | 2011 | | 2021 | |
| Religion | Number | % | Number | % |
|---|---|---|---|---|
| Hinduism | 621,983 | 44.02% | 797,684 | 42.79% |
| Sikhism | 312,965 | 22.15% | 386,825 | 20.75% |
| Islam | 197,161 | 13.95% | 246,968 | 13.25% |
| Christianity | 135,988 | 9.62% | 225,935 | 12.12% |
| No religion | 44,281 | 3.13% | 84,574 | 4.54% |
| Buddhism | 3,637 | 0.26% | 3,587 | 0.19% |
| Judaism | 819 | 0.06% | 557 | 0.03% |
| Other religions | 33,003 | 2.34% | 38,274 | 2.05% |
| Not Stated | 63,121 | 4.47% | 79,913 | 4.29% |
| Total | 1,412,958 | 100% | 1,864,317 | 100% |

== Culture ==
The British Council, Indian High Commission and UK government named 2017 the ‘UK India Year of Culture’, which was launched by the Queen. The year it was held was significant as it marked 70 years of Indian Independence from the British Raj. Its aim was to celebrate the relationship between the two nations through cultural events, exhibitions and activities organised in both countries throughout the year. The Nehru Centre is the cultural wing of the High Commission of India in the UK which was established in 1992.

=== Cuisine ===
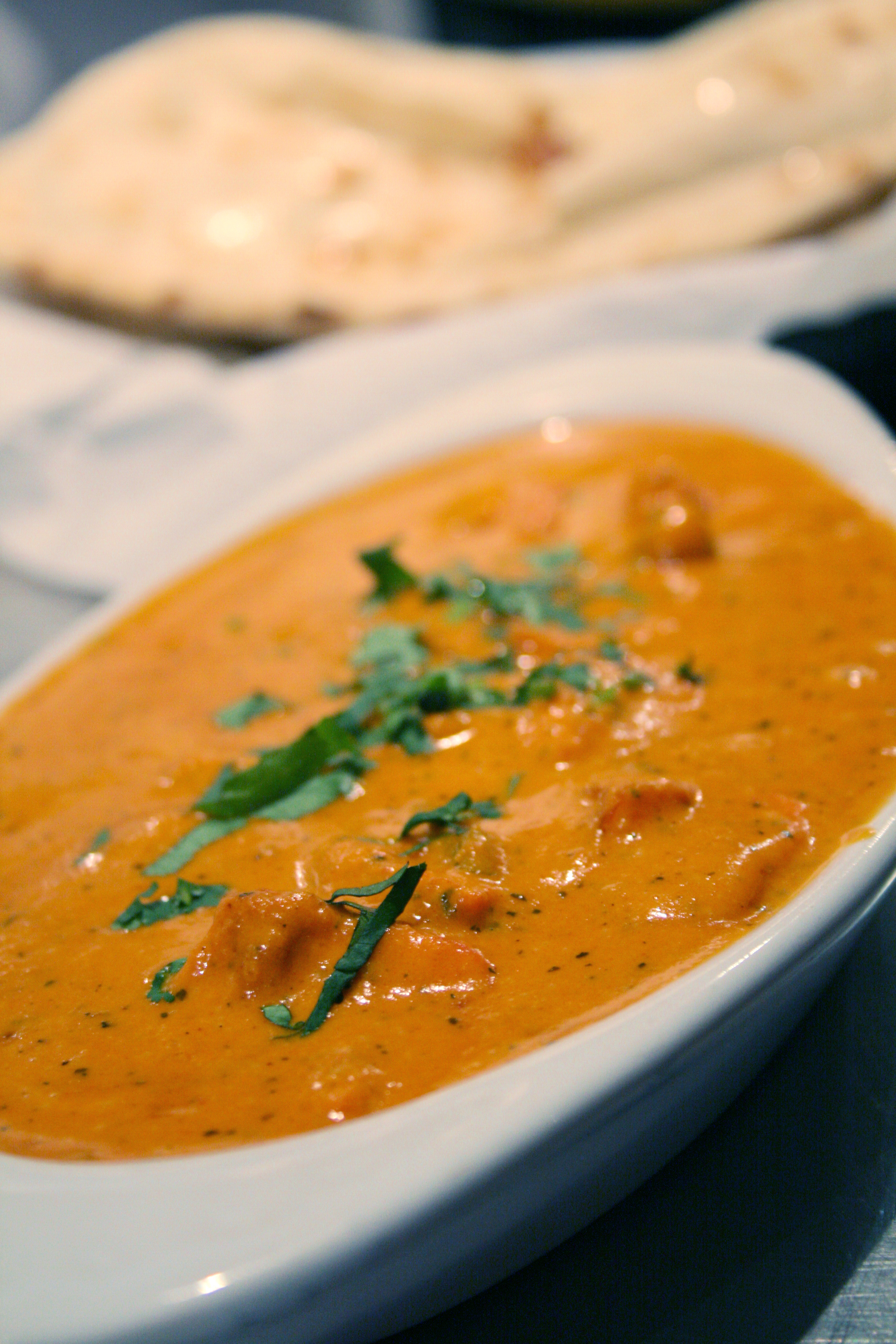
Chicken tikka masala is regarded as a British national dish.

Indian cuisine is extremely popular in the United Kingdom. The first exclusively Indian restaurant was the Hindoostanee Coffee House which opened in 1810. Curry gained popularity in the UK in the 1940s and 1950s.

There are around 9,000 Indian restaurants located across the UK, which equates to approximately one per 7,000 people.

Over 2 million Britons eat at Indian restaurants in the UK every week, with a further 3 million cooking at least one Indian based meal at home during the week. Veeraswamy, located on Regent Street in London, is the oldest surviving Indian restaurant in the UK, having opened in 1926. Veeraswamy is believed to be the origin of combining a curry and a pint of beer.

Seven Indian restaurants have a Michelin Star - six of which are located in London including Veeraswamey, with the only Michelin rated restaurant outside of London based in Birmingham - Opheem.

=== Film ===
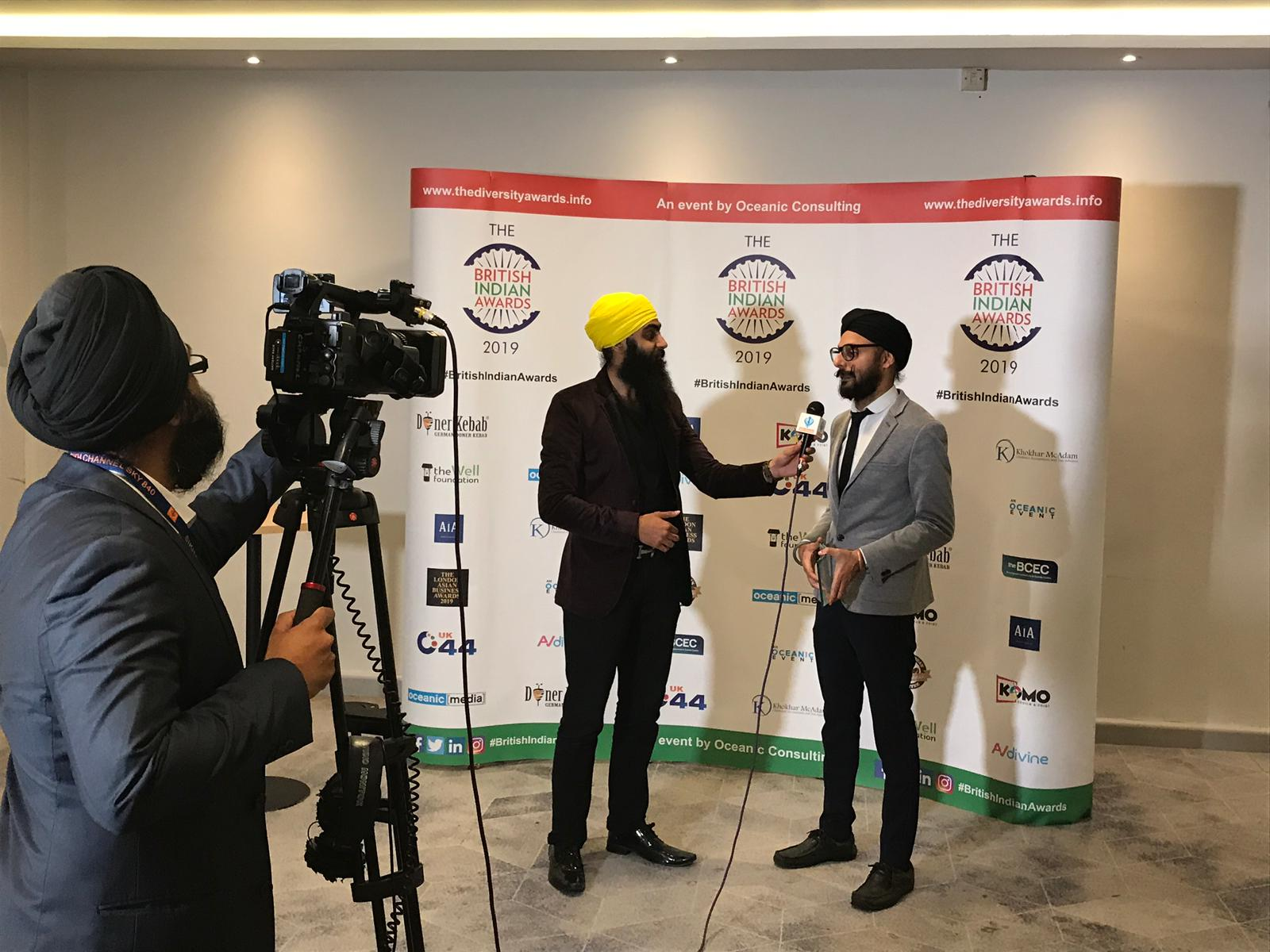
Param Singh at the British Indian Awards in 2019

Notable British Indian films include Bend It Like Beckham, whose story revolves around British Indian life, and Slumdog Millionaire, a British drama film set in Mumbai starring British Indian actor Dev Patel in the lead role. The latter has won four Golden Globes, seven BAFTA Awards and eight Academy Awards. The Best Exotic Marigold Hotel, a British film set in India, was nominated for two Golden Globes and one BAFTA, grossing US$31 million at the end of the UK run. Besides British-produced Indian-based films, there are many Bollywood productions which have been filmed in the UK, including Dilwale Dulhania Le Jayenge, Yaadein, Kabhi Khushi Kabhi Gham and Jab Tak Hai Jaan. The following is a partial list of films based on British Indian life, British films shot in India or with an Indian theme or has British Indian actors:

- Autobiography of a Princess (1975)
- Hullabaloo Over Georgie and Bonnie's Pictures (1978)
- Gandhi (1982) - With British Indian actor Ben Kingsley as Gandhi
- A Passage to India (1984) - Film set during the early 20th century India
- The Jewel in the Crown (1984) - TV series set during the 1940s British Raj era
- Sammy and Rosie Get Laid (1987)
- Bhaji on the Beach (1993) - A film by Gurinder Chadha depicts life of a group of West London Asian women.
- The Buddha of Suburbia (1993)
- Kama Sutra: A Tale of Love (1996)
- My Son the Fanatic (1997)
- Such a Long Journey (1998)
- Bend It Like Beckham (2002) - A film by Gurinder Chadha depicts life of a London Sikh family.
- The Guru (2002)
- Bride and Prejudice (2004) - A Gurinder Chadha take on Jane Austen's Pride and prejudice with an International setting of locations and cast.
- Namastey London (2007)
- Before the Rains (2008)
- Slumdog Millionaire (2008) - Film set in Mumbai with Londoner Dev Patel in the title role.
- The Best Exotic Marigold Hotel (2012) - Film set in Rajasthan with Londoner Dev Patel in an important role.
- The Second Best Exotic Marigold Hotel (2015) - Film set in Jaipur with Londoner Dev Patel in an important role.
- The Man Who Knew Infinity (2015) - depicting the life of the Indian mathematical prodigy Ramanujan, with Londoner Dev Patel in the lead role.

=== Music ===
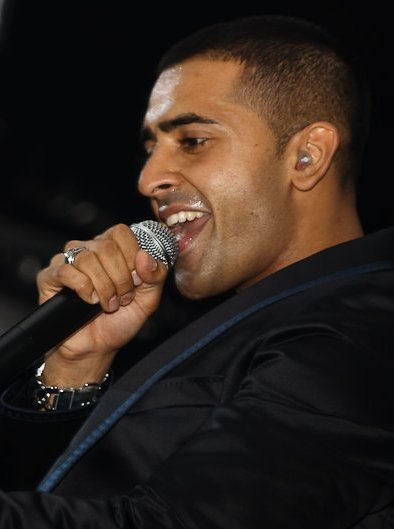
Singer Jay Sean

Indian influence on British popular music dates back to the development of raga rock by British rock bands such as The Beatles and The Rolling Stones; several Beatles songs (such as "Within You Without You") also featured London-based Indian musicians. Today, British Indian musicians exist in almost every field and genre. Notable British Indian Bhangra acts include Panjabi MC, Rishi Rich, Juggy D, Jay Sean, DCS, Bally Sagoo and Sukshinder Shinda. World-famous award-winning singer-songwriter Freddie Mercury (a former member of the rock band Queen) was born on the island of Zanzibar to Parsi parents, originally from the Gujarat area of India. Mercury (born Farrokh Bulsara) and his family fled when he was 17 years old due to the Zanzibar Revolution; he remains not only one of the most famous British Indian musicians of all time, but one of the most famous British musicians. Other world-famous British Indian musicians include Biddu, who produced a number of worldwide disco hits such as "Kung Fu Fighting", one of the best-selling singles of all time having sold eleven million records worldwide, and Apache Indian, who also had worldwide hits such as "Boom Shack-A-Lak". Jay Sean, whose parents immigrated to the United Kingdom from the Punjab region, is the first solo British Asian artist to reach the #1 spot on the Billboard Hot 100 with his single "Down" selling more than four million copies in the United States, making him "the most successful male UK urban artist in US chart history." Other contemporary British Indian singers include S-Endz and BRIT Award-nominated Nerina Pallot.

=== Literature ===
British Indians have also contributed to British literature. Well known examples include author Salman Rushdie who won the Booker Prize in 1981. More contemporary contributions come from authors including Nikesh Shukla who is the editor of the 2016 collection of essays The Good Immigrant, which explores the experience of immigrant and ethnic minority life in the United Kingdom from their perspective, including contributions from other British Indians Nish Kumar and Himesh Patel. The Harry Potter series, by British author JK Rowling, also features two notable characters who are presumed to be of Indian Marathi descent - Padma and Parvati Patil.

=== Art ===
British Artist F. N. Souza was one of the first Indian artists to work in Britain after the war. Together with Avinash Chandra they were the first British Indian artists to be included in the national collection at the Tate. In 1962, the ''Festival of India'' - a six-month celebration of Indian culture and art - was held across a number of prestigious galleries and museums in London and was called "most comprehensive collection of Indian painting and sculpture ever assembled anywhere" by the New York Times. The Indian Painters Collective (IPC) was formed in London in 1963. They created the first artistic body of its kind outside of India and achieve the first group showing of Indian artists in the UK. In 1978 IPC was renamed Indian Artists UK (IAUK) with the desire to establish an Indian Academy of Visual Arts in Britain. Sir Anish Kapoor is a British sculptor who came to prominence in the 1980s and later went onto win the Turner Prize in 2002.

=== Fashion ===
Neelam Gill is the first British Indian model to feature as a high fashion model. Supriya Lele is a British Indian fashion designer who blends her heritage into her work. Priya Ahluwalia is a British designer of Nigerian and Indian descent and the founder of menswear brand Ahluwalia and was given the Queen Elizabeth II Award for British Design. In March 2020, Ahluwalia was featured in the Forbes 30 under 30 European Arts and Culture list. Mandeep and Hardeep Chohan, twin sisters of Indian origin jointly own fashion label, Nom de Mode, which draws inspiration from their roots.

=== Sports ===
Cricket is one of the main sports played by British Indians, due to its prominent heritage in both the UK and India. Over twice as many British South Asians play football rather than cricket, however. There is also a minor presence of traditional Indian games in the community.

=== Television ===
Long-running British soap operas such as Coronation Street, EastEnders, Emmerdale and Hollyoaks have all had significant numbers of Indian characters, while shorter British series such as The Jewel in the Crown and Skins also feature British Indian characters. By far the most notable British Indian television shows are Goodness Gracious Me and The Kumars at No. 42, a talk show that stars many famous British Indian actors including Sanjeev Bhaskar, Meera Syal, Indira Joshi and Vincent Ebrahim which originally aired on the BBC. British Indian actors not only have a strong presence in the UK, but also in the United States, where Parminder Nagra, Naveen Andrews and Kunal Nayyar (who are all Britons of Indian origin) have found fame in ER, Lost, The Big Bang Theory and Desperate Housewives respectively, though Nagra is the only one to portray an actual British citizen of Indian descent. Dr Ranj is a British Indian TV host best known as a celebrity dancer on Strictly Come Dancing, and co-creating and presenting the CBeebies show Get Well Soon.

There are dozens of TV channels aimed at the British Indian community available on Satellite and Cable, which include:

| Indian owned | Sky channel | Virgin Media channel | Other |
|---|---|---|---|
| Sony TV Asia | 782 | 806 | N/A |
| STAR One | 783 | N/A | N/A |
| STAR Plus | 784 | 803 | N/A |
| Zee TV | 788 | 809 | Channel 555 (TalkTalk TV) |
| Zee Music | 789 | N/A | N/A |
| Zee Cinema | 617 | 810 | N/A |
| Alpha ETC Punjabi | 798 | 812 | N/A |
| SET Max | 800 | 806 | N/A |
| Aastha TV | 807 | N/A | N/A |
| STAR News | 808 | 802 | N/A |
| STAR Gold | 809 | N/A | N/A |
| Zee Gujarati | 811 | N/A | N/A |
| SAB TV | 816 | N/A | N/A |
| Sahara One | 817 | N/A | N/A |
| Aaj Tak | 818 | N/A | N/A |
| Peace TV | 820 | N/A | N/A |
| Zee Jaagran | 838 | N/A | N/A |

| Joint owned | Sky channel | Virgin Media channel | Other |
|---|---|---|---|
| B4U Movies | 780 | 815 | N/A |
| B4U Music | 781 | 816 | Channel 504 (Freesat) |
| 9X | 828 | N/A | Channel 662 (Freesat) |
| 9XM | 829 | N/A | N/A |
| NDTV Imagine | 831 | N/A | N/A |

| British owned | Sky channel | Virgin Media channel | Other |
|---|---|---|---|
| MATV | 793 | 823 | N/A |

=== Radio ===
The BBC Asian Network is a radio station available across the United Kingdom which is aimed predominantly at Britons of South Asian origin under 35 years of age. Besides this popular station there are only a few other national radio stations for or run by the British Indian community — including Sunrise and Yarr Radios. Regional British Indian stations include Asian Sound of Manchester, Hindu Sanskar and Sabras Radios of Leicester, Kismat Radio of London, Radio XL of Birmingham and Sunrise Radio Yorkshire based in Bradford (which itself has a much larger Pakistani than Indian community).

== Achievements ==
=== Politics ===
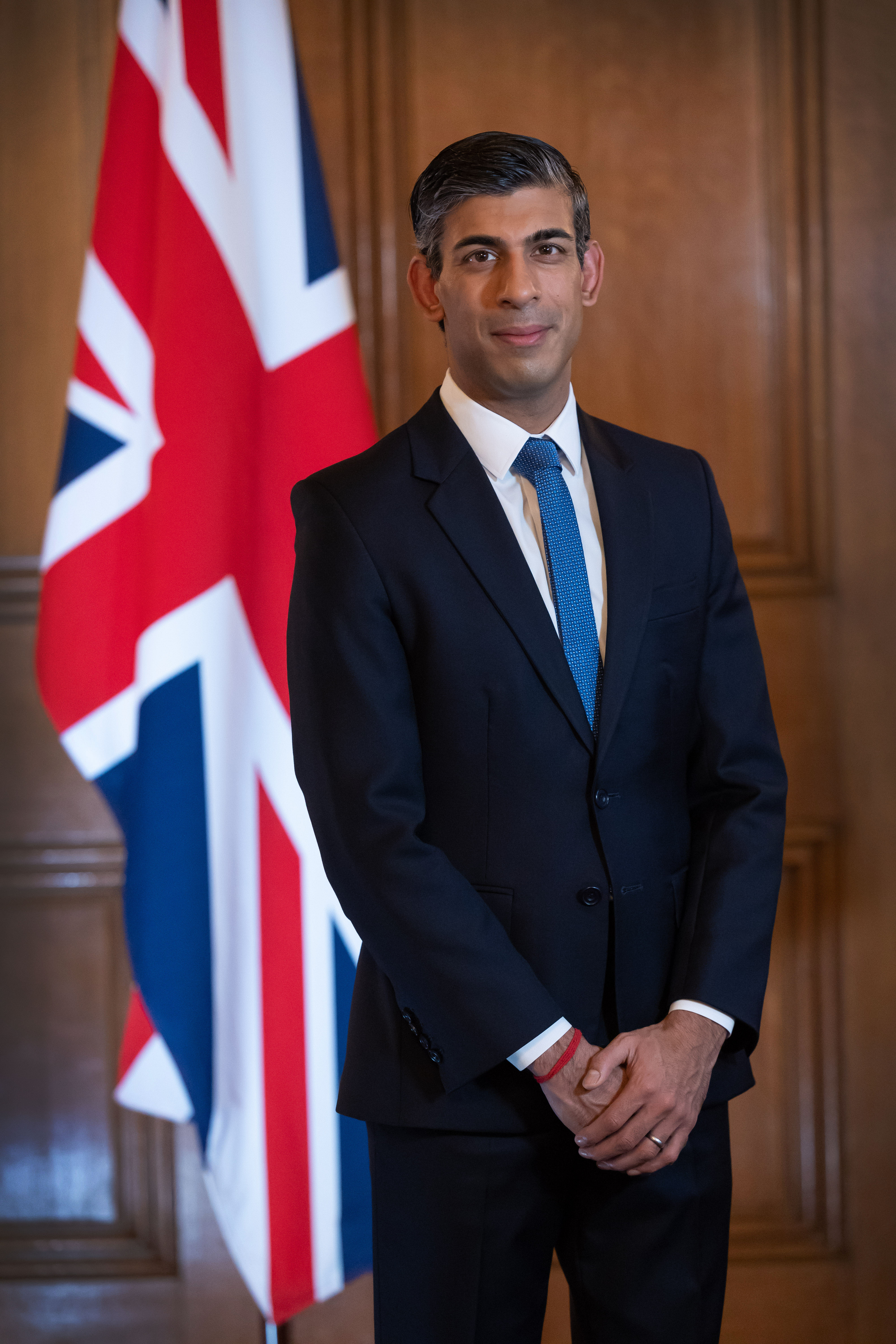
Rishi Sunak, the first British Indian leader of the Conservative Party and prime minister (October 2022 to July 2024)

David Ochterlony Dyce Sombre was the first British politician of Indian descent to win a seat in parliament; he was elected to represent the Sudbury constituency in July 1841, but was removed in April 1842 due to bribery in the election. Dadabhai Naoroji was the second British Indian politician to win a seat in parliament; he was elected as a Liberal MP for Finsbury in 1892.

British Indians have historically tended to vote for the Labour Party, due to strong links with local party branches and a degree of community voting, but it has been argued that the assimilation of younger British Indians and the consequent weakening of community bonds and parental political ties, this relationship has started to break down. The Conservative Party's modernisation and efforts to attract British Indian voters have also contributed to changing political affiliations.

The Ethnic Minority British Election Study estimated that 61 per cent of British Indians voted Labour in the 2010 general election, 24 per cent Conservative and 13 per cent Liberal Democrat. A 2019 analysis by the Runnymede Trust estimated that, in the 2010 general election, 57 per cent of British Indians voted for the Labour Party and 30 per cent voted for the Conservative Party. Academic research in the build-up to the 2015 general election indicated that 69 per cent of British Indians supported Labour and 24 per cent the Conservatives.

First elected as a Conservative Party MP in 2015, Rishi Sunak became the first UK Prime Minister from a British Indian background in October 2022, holding the position until the Conservatives' July 2024 general election loss. Shami Chakrabarti, who was born to Indian immigrant parents, is one of a few British Indian life peers. Others include Lord Desai who is of Gujarati descent.

In the 2015 general election, approximately 57.5 per cent of British Indians voted for Labour and 31 per cent voted for the Conservatives. In the 2017 general election, approximately 58 per cent of British Indians voted for Labour, while 40 per cent of British Indians voted for the Conservatives. According to the same report, British Indians were more likely than most other ethnic minorities to vote for Brexit, although 65 per cent to 67 per cent of British Indians voted to remain in the European Union.

During the 2019 United Kingdom general election, The Times of India reported that supporters of Narendra Modi's ruling Bharatiya Janata Party (BJP) were actively campaigning for the Tories in 48 marginal seats, and the Today programme reported that it had seen WhatsApp messages sent to Hindus across the country urging them to vote Conservative. Some British Indians spoke out against what they saw as the BJP's meddling in the UK election.

The Hindu Council UK was strongly critical of Labour under the leadership of Jeremy Corbyn, going as far as to say that Labour was "anti-Hindu" and objected to the party's condemnation of the Indian government's actions in the disputed territory of Kashmir.

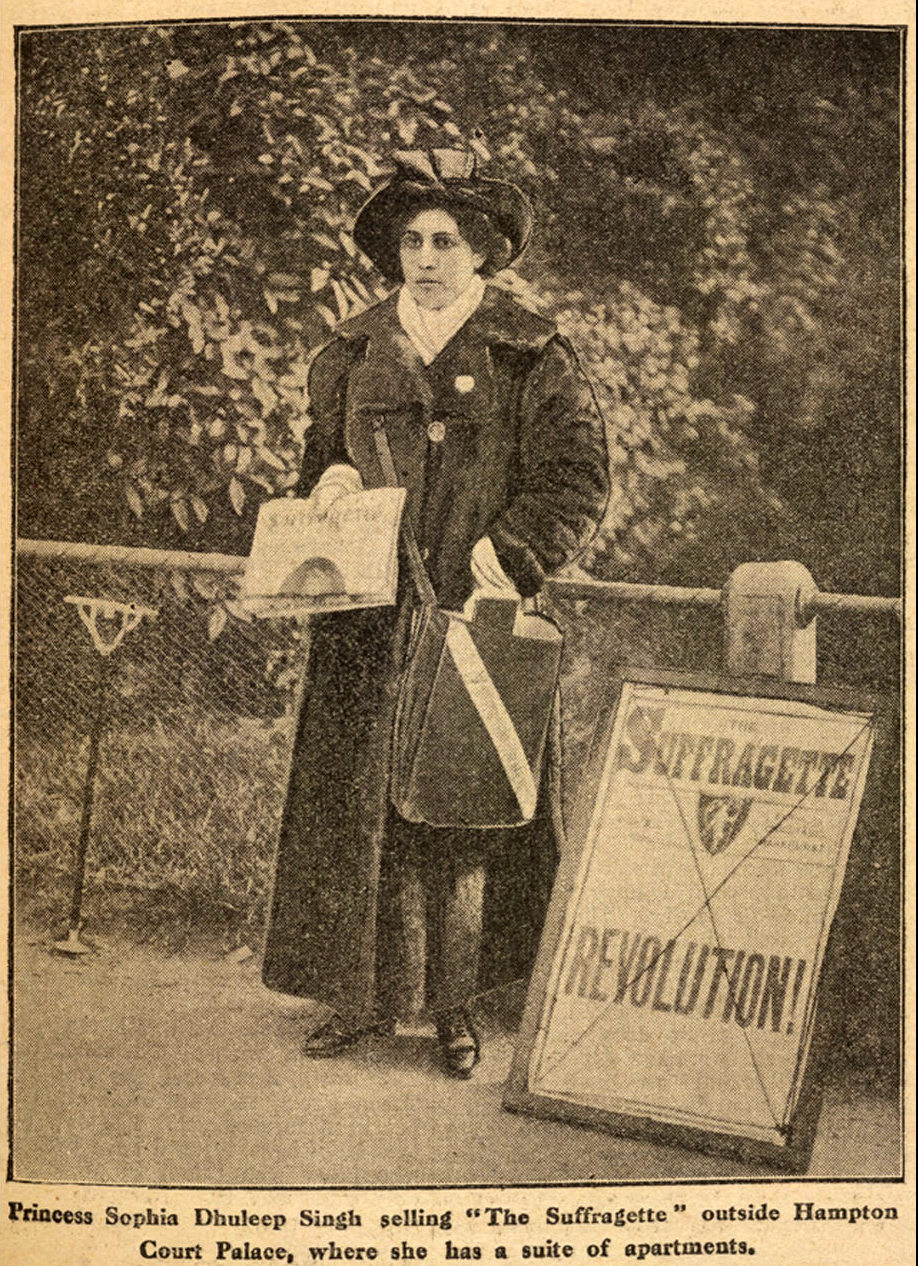
Sophia Duleep Singh - British Indian suffragette sells newspapers

Research conducted by UK in a Changing Europe in 2023 has suggested that British Indian and British Chinese voters held more economically right-wing views, but held the most socially liberal attitudes, in particular towards the LGBT community, compared to other ethnic minorities in the UK. Survey data indicated Conservatives (45 per cent) led Labour (35 per cent) by 10 points amongst Hindus in 2019.

==== Early political activism ====
Sophia Duleep Singh was a suffragette of Indian origin, being the daughter of Duleep Singh, the last maharaja of the Sikh Empire. A number of organisations exist that have been established by British Indians to promote and advocate for issues important to Indian Britons. These include the India League (formally established in 1928), which was a Britain-based organisation whose aim was to campaign for the full independence and self-governance of India. The Indian Workers' Association (IWA) is a political organisation in Great Britain consisting of Indian immigrants to Britain and their descendants. IWA branches are organised in some major cities such as Birmingham and London. It fought for better working and living standards, it also lobbied for Indian independence and campaigned on issues such as racism and on civil liberties.

=== Economic status ===
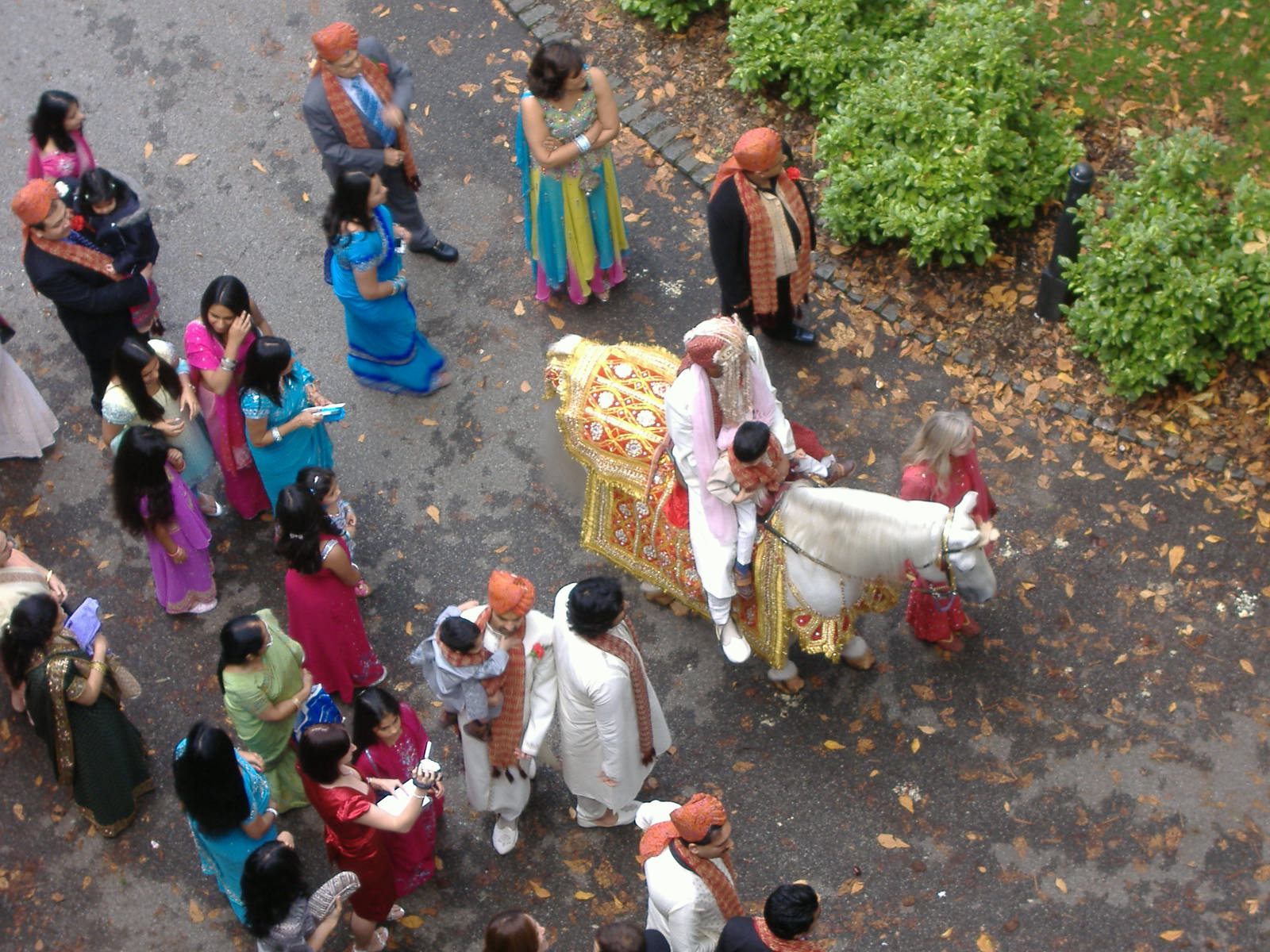
A traditional Indian wedding in Nottingham, 2006

A study by the Joseph Rowntree Foundation in 2007 found that British Indians had lowest poverty rates among different ethnic groups in Britain, second only to white British. Of the different ethnic groups, Bangladeshis (65%), Pakistanis (55%) and black Africans (45%) had the highest poverty rates; black Caribbeans (30%), Indians (25%), white Other (25%) and white British (20%) had the lowest rates.

According to official UK Government figures from 2018, British Indians had the highest employment rate of all ethnic minorities at 76%; the overall employment rate in the UK is 75%, with the employment rate for White British people also standing at 76%. The unemployment rate of British Indians was 4% in 2018, the lowest of all ethnic minorities.

Research from the Resolution Foundation published in 2020 has found that British Indians hold the highest median total household net wealth among major British ethnic groups at £347,400.

| Ethnic group | Median total household net wealth (2016–18) |
|---|---|
| Indian | £347,400 |
| White British | £324,100 |
| Pakistani | £232,200 |
| Black Caribbean | £125,400 |
| Bangladeshi | £124,700 |
| Other White | £122,800 |
| Chinese | £73,500 |
| Black African | £28,400 |

Among the working-age population, with pensions thus excluded, British Indians have the highest median total wealth at £178,980:

| Ethnic group | Median total household wealth (excluding pensions) (2006/8) |
|---|---|
| Indian | £178,980 |
| White British | £174,007 |
| Black Caribbean | £62,702 |
| Other minority ethnic groups | £41,500 |

According to official figures, British Indians have the third highest average pay levels in the UK among all ethnic groups:

| Ethnic group | Median hourly pay (2022) |
|---|---|
| White Irish | £20.20 |
| Chinese | £17.73 |
| Indian | £17.29 |
| Mixed White and Asian | £16.93 |
| White British | £14.42 |

UK Government figures also demonstrate that British Indians have the highest proportion of workers in professional and managerial occupations, out of all ethnic groups in the UK:

| Ethnic group | Percentage of workers in professional and managerial occupations |
|---|---|
| Indian | 43% |
| Other | 34% |
| White | 31% |
| Mixed | 30% |
| Pakistani/Bangladeshi | 27% |
| Black | 25% |

The 2021 census for England and Wales found that British Indians were least likely to live in social housing and had some of the highest rates of home ownership and amongst all ethnic groups:

Tenure by ethnicity in England and Wales
| Ethnic group | Social rented | Privately rented | Own with mortgage | Own outright |
|---|---|---|---|---|
| Indian | 6% | 25% | 43% | 26% |
| Chinese | 8% | 31% | 32% | 29% |
| Pakistani | 14% | 26% | 37% | 23% |
| White British | 16% | 16% | 30% | 37% |
| White Irish | 18% | 19% | 27% | 37% |
| Arab | 27% | 48% | 15% | 10% |
| Mixed | 27% | 33% | 28% | 12% |
| Bangladeshi | 34% | 27% | 30% | 9% |
| Black | 43% | 27% | 21% | 9% |
| Irish Traveller/White Gypsy | 44% | 28% | 9% | 19% |

=== Academic performance ===
According to official UK Government statistics, British Indian pupils have a high average level of academic performance. 77% of British Indian pupils attained A* to C grades in English and Maths in the 2015–16 academic year, second only to Chinese pupils, of whom 83% attained A* to C grades in English and Maths. At A-Level, in the 2016–17 academic year, 15.3% of British Indian pupils achieved at least 3 'A' grades at A-Level, with only the British Chinese ethnic group (24.8%) achieving the same benchmark at a higher rate.

According to Department for Education statistics for the 2021–22 academic year, British Indian pupils in England attained the second highest level of academic performance at both A-Level and GCSE, behind only Chinese pupils. 28.4% of British Indian pupils achieved at least 3 As at A Level and an average score of 61.3 was achieved in Attainment 8 scoring at GCSE level. According to the National Equality Panel, Indian Hindu and Sikh pupils were found to achieve better academic results than Indian Muslim pupils. Trevor Phillips, former chairman of the Equality and Human Rights Commission, has argued that Chinese and Indian-heritage pupils achieve high standards of academic attainment regardless of the school attended or poverty levels.

Percentage of students getting at least 3 A grades at A level (2021/22)
| Ethnic Group | % |
|---|---|
| Chinese | 36.8 |
| Indian | 28.4 |
| All ethnic groups (average) | 23.1 |
| Mixed | 21.1 |
| White | 20.7 |
| Bangladeshi | 16.5 |
| Pakistani | 15.8 |
| Black | 12.3 |
| Gypsy/Roma | 2.2 |

Average GCSE Attainment 8 score (out of 90.0) (2021/22)
| Ethnic group | Score |
|---|---|
| Chinese | 66.1 |
| Indian | 61.3 |
| Bangladeshi | 54.4 |
| Mixed | 49.4 |
| Pakistani | 49.1 |
| All ethnic groups (average) | 48.8 |
| Black | 48.6 |
| White | 47.8 |
| Gypsy/Roma | 21.0 |

Percentage of pupils getting a grade 5 or above in English and maths GCSE (2021/22)
| Ethnic group | % |
|---|---|
| Chinese | 80.0 |
| Indian | 73.0 |
| Bangladeshi | 62.1 |
| Pakistani | 51.2 |
| Mixed | 49.9 |
| All ethnic groups (average) | 49.8 |
| Black | 49.4 |
| White | 47.9 |
| Gypsy/Roma | 8.5 |

== Social issues ==
=== Caste system ===
A number of British Hindus still adhere to the caste system and still seek marriage with individuals who are of similar caste categories. There have been several incidents involving abuse of low caste British Hindus, known as Dalits, by higher caste individuals in schools and workplaces though no documented case has occurred in recent time.

==== Inter-ethnic relationships ====
Despite the permanence of the caste system, studies of inter-ethnic partnerships in the United Kingdom indicate that British Indians have the highest exogamy rates among South Asian groups. According to analyses of the 2011 Census by the Office for National Statistics, approximately 12% of British Indians were in inter-ethnic relationships (married or cohabiting), higher than Bangladeshis (7%), Pakistanis (9%) as well White British (4%). The "Indian and White British" pairing was the most common among the British Indians in an inter-ethnic relationship, amounting to some 40,000 individuals or 2% of all inter-ethnic relationships in 2011.

According to data reproduced in the Marriage Foundation’s 2016 report on religion and family stability, approximately 90% of Indian women in couple relationships have partners who are also Indian. Among those married outside their ethnicity, White men account for around 7% of partners of Indian women, while unions with Pakistani or Bangladeshi men stand both at roughly 2% and those with Black men at around 1%.

=== Female foeticide ===
According to a study published by Oxford University 1500 girls are missing from birth records in England and Wales over a 15-year period from 1990 to 2005. The vast majority of the abortions are carried out in India reports suggest that abortions rejected on the NHS would force some British Indians to travel to India for the procedure. There have also been cases where British Indian doctors who would pass on details to their patients about clinics abroad which offer sex selective screening and abortion for women who have passed the 24-week abortion limit in the United Kingdom.

In 2025, official statistics for England and Wales identified sex ratio imbalances at birth among children born to mothers of Indian ethnicity. Analysis of Office for National Statistics data indicates that during 2017–2021, children of Indian ethnicity born at third or higher birth order recorded a ratio of approximately 113 boys per 100 girls, compared with a national average of about 105 males per 100 females. More recent registration data for 2021–2025 show ratios of around 118 boys per 100 girls, indicating an increase over time and a further divergence from both the national average and the upper range typically expected from biological variation. A government report published in 2023 estimated that approximately 400 female births of Indian ethnicity may have been absent from the 2017–2021 data, based on standard demographic methods. The report noted that no other ethnic group showed a comparable statistically significant pattern.

=== Discrimination ===
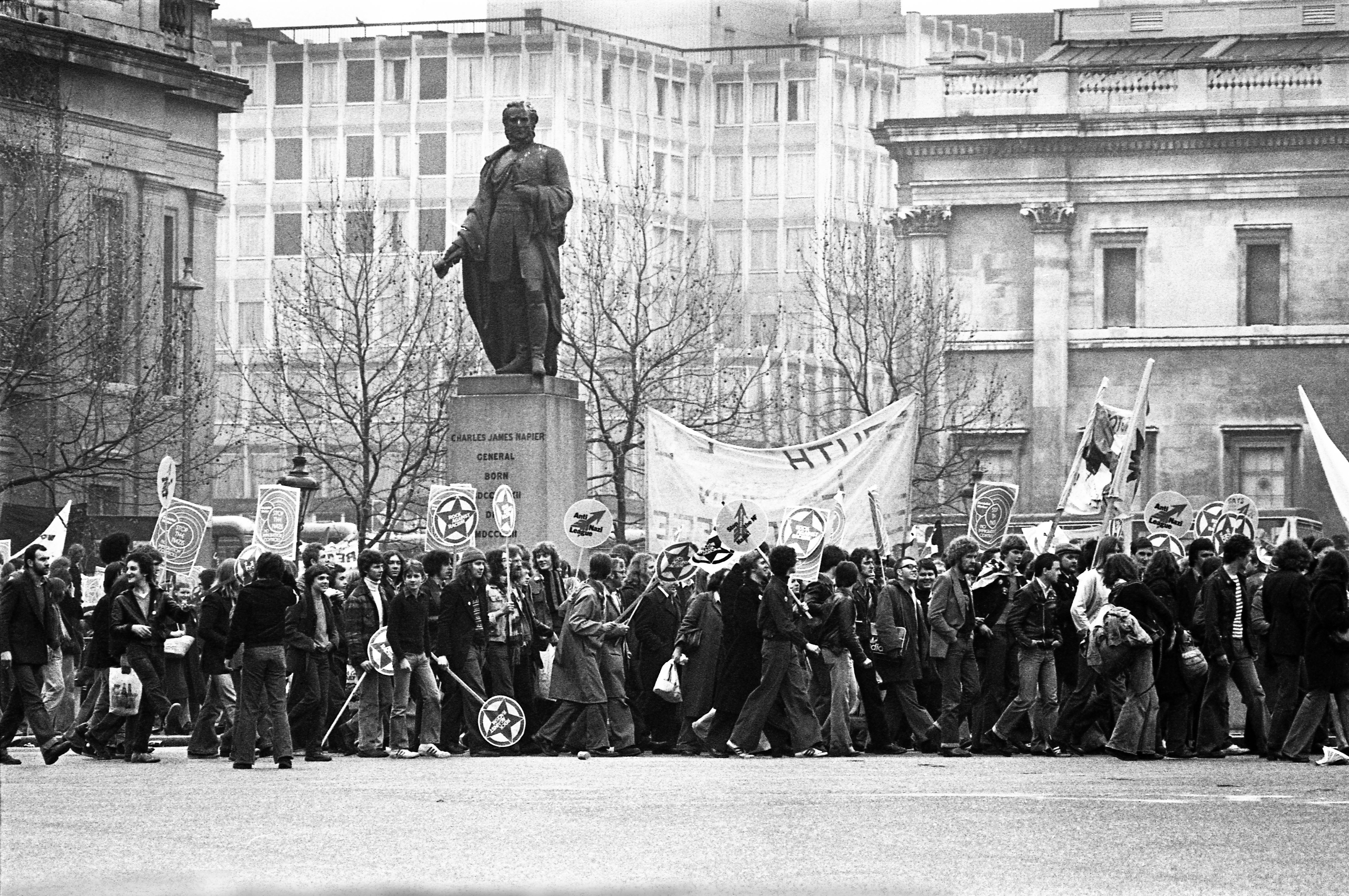
Rock Against Racism marches were commonplace in the United Kingdom in response to racist attacks on racial minorities

Discrimination against people of Indian origin in the United Kingdom has a long history.

Starting in the late 1960s and peaked during the 1970s and 1980s, Indians and other racial minority groups living in the United Kingdom were the victims of racist violence and they were often subjected to physical violence by supporters of far-right, anti-immigration and racist political parties such as the National Front (NF) and the British National Party (BNP). The political organisation Indian Workers' Association was one of many organisations which helped to oppose racist attacks. In 1976 the Rock Against Racism political and cultural movement was formed as a reaction to racist attacks that were happening on the streets of the United Kingdom.

Verbal discrimination has become somewhat more common after the 9/11 and 7/7 attacks, even though extremists who committed these atrocities have little to nothing to do with the British Indian community. A notable example of anti-Indian sentiment in the UK is the 2007 Celebrity Big Brother racism controversy which received significant media coverage. Contestants Jade Goody (who was mixed race), Danielle Lloyd and Jo O'Meara were all seen to have been mocking Bollywood actress Shilpa Shetty because of her accent. They also persisted in making fun of general parts of Indian culture. Channel 4 screened the arguments between the contestants, which received over 50,000 complaints. The controversy generated over 300 newspaper articles in Britain, 1,200 in English language newspapers around the globe, 3,900 foreign language news articles, and 22,000 blog postings on the internet.

Another example of discrimination is the Expulsion of Asians in Uganda in 1972 (a decision made by the President of Uganda to ethnically cleanse the country) which led to tens of thousands of East African Indians coming to the UK to start a new life, the majority of them already had British passports, due to Uganda at that time being part of the British Empire.

Other examples of discrimination towards British Indians in the mainstream population include the case of 27-year-old Chetankumar Meshram, a call centre trainer from Northampton who was compensated £5,000 after his boss told him he was to be replaced by a better English speaker. Also Meena Sagoo, 42 is demanding over £100,000 after she and a fellow employee of the ING Bank of Sri Lankan heritage were called The Kumars at No. 42 (after the popular TV comedy show of the same name). The same bank has been noted to have paid out £20,000 to a worker of Chinese origin who also claimed racial harassment.

Another form of discrimination towards British Indians is stereotyping, one example is British Asians stereotyped as being the majority of newsagent and convenience store shopkeepers, the stereotype "Paki shop". This stereotype was made fun of in the television and radio sketches of Goodness Gracious Me by four British Indian comedy actors. In the comedy sketch Little Britain, a British Indian character called Meera continuously receives racist comments from weight loss advisor Marjorie Dawes who always makes it known that she does not understand a word of what Meera says, although it is completely obvious to the surrounding people and the viewer.

== See also ==
- Indian community of London
- Immigration to the United Kingdom since 1922
- British India
- British Pakistani
- British Bangladeshi
- Romani people in the United Kingdom
- India–United Kingdom relations
