= List of Hindu temples in the United Kingdom =

Hinduism is the third-largest religion in the United Kingdom after Christianity and Islam. The 2021 census recorded 1,020,533 Hindus in England and Wales, comprising 1.7% of the population. The development of Hindu temples in Britain is closely linked to postwar migration from India and the later arrival of Hindu communities from East Africa. Hindu places of worship in the United Kingdom vary widely in form, smaller temples often are converted buildings such as houses, community halls or former industrial premises. Others are large purpose-built temple complexes. Notable examples include Bhaktivedanta Manor (donated to ISKCON by George Harrison in 1973), BAPS Shri Swaminarayan Mandir in Neasden (opened in 1995 as Europe's first traditional Hindu temple and the Shri Venkateswara (Balaji) Temple (opened in 2006). Historic England survey identified 187 Hindu temples in England in 2020.

== England ==
=== Greater London ===
Temple	Area	Notes	Image
BAPS Shri Swaminarayan Mandir	Neasden, Brent	Inaugurated 1995; Europe's first traditional stone mandir	
Shree Sanatan Hindu Mandir	Wembley, Brent	Vallabh Nidhi	
Shree Swaminarayan Mandir	Kingsbury, Brent		
London Sri Mahalakshmi Temple	East Ham, Newham		
London Sri Murugan Temple	Manor Park, Newham	Murugan temple	
Shri Sanatan Hindu Mandir (Durga Mandir)	Ilford, Redbridge		
Sri Selva Vinayagar Temple	Ilford, Redbridge		
Shree Ghanapathy Temple	Wimbledon, Merton	Dedicated to Ganesha; est. 1980s	
New Malden Murugan Temple	New Malden, Kingston	Murugan temple	
Highgate Hill Murugan Temple	Highgate Hill, Islington	Murugan temple	
Shri Kanaga Thurkkai Amman Temple	West Ealing, Ealing		
Vishwa Hindu Mandir	Southall, Ealing		
Shree Ram Mandir	Southall, Ealing		
Laxmi Narayan Mandir	Hounslow		
Radha Krishna Temple (ISKCON)	Soho, Westminster	ISKCON	
ISKCON South London Temple	South Norwood, Croydon	ISKCON	
Caribbean Hindu Cultural Society Temple	Brixton Hill, Lambeth		
Muththumari Amman Temple	Tooting, Wandsworth		
Muththumari Amman Temple	Tooting, Wandsworth		

=== Southern England ===
Temple	Area	Notes	Image
Bedford Hindu Community Centre & Temple	Bedford, Bedfordshire		
Geeta Ashram	Bedford, Bedfordshire		
Shree Sanatan Seva Samaj	Bedford, Bedfordshire		
BAPS Shri Swaminarayan Mandir	Luton, Bedforshire	BAPS	
Bhaktivedanta Manor	Watford, Hertfordshire	ISKCON	
U.K. Nagara Shiva Temple	Watford, Hertfordshire		
Slough Hindu Temple	Slough, Berkshire		
Reading Hindu Temple	Reading, Berkshire		
Shirdi Sai Baba Temple & Community Centre	Reading, Berkshire		
Gloucester Hindu Temple	Gloucester, Gloucestershire		
Krishna Mandir	Cheltenham, Gloucestershire		

=== Northern England ===
Temple	Area	Notes	Image
Shree Kutch Satsang Swaminarayan Temple	Bolton, Greater Manchester		
Veda Mandir	Bolton, Greater Manchester		
Geeta Bhavan Mandir	Manchester, Greater Manchester		
Hare Krishna Centre (ISKCON)	Manchester, Greater Manchester	ISKCON	
Radha Krishna Mandir	Manchester, Greater Manchester		
Liverpool Sri Muthumariamman Temple	Liverpool, Merseyide		
Liverpool Ganesh Temple	Kirby, Merseyside		
BAPS Shri Swaminarayan Hindu Mandir	Preston, Lancashire	BAPS	
Shree Lakshmi Narayan Hindu Temple	Bradford, West Yorkshire		
Shree Swaminarayan Mandir, Oldham	Oldham		

=== The Midlands ===
Temple	Area	Notes	Image
ISKCON Temple, Leicester	Leicester, Leicestershire	ISKCON	
Shree Jalaram Prarthana Mandal	Leicester, Leicestershire	Temple dedicated to Jalaram Bapa	
BAPS Shri Swaminarayan Mandir, Leicester	Leicester, Leicestershire	BAPS	
Leicester Sri Murugan Temple	Leicester, Leicestershire		
Sanatan Mandir	Leicester, Leicestershire		
Shree Ram Mandir	Leicester, Leicestershire		
ISKCON Birmingham	Birmingham	ISKCON	
Shree Geeta Bhawan	Birmingham		
BAPS Shri Swaminarayan Mandir, Birmingham	Birmingham		
Shree Laxmi Narayan Mandir	Birmingham		
Shri Venkateswara (Balaji) Temple	Tividale, West Midlands		

=== Eastern England ===
Temple	Area	Notes	Image
Bharat Hindu Samaj (Shri Ram Mandir)	Peterborough, Cambridgeshire		

== Northern Ireland ==
Temple	Area	Notes	Image
Govindadwipa (Krishna Island)	Derrylin, Fermanagh	ISKCON island temple on Lough Erne	
Laxmi Narayana Mandir	Belfast		
Radha–Madhava Mandir	Belfast		

== Scotland ==
Temple	Area	Notes	Image
Aberdeen Hindu Temple	Aberdeen		
Edinburgh Hindu Mandir & Cultural Centre	Edinburgh		

== Wales ==
Temples	Area	Notes	Image
Skanda Vale	Llanpumsaint, Carmarthenshire	Multi-faith ashram community	
Bhaktidham Wales	Cardiff		
Shree Swaminarayan Temple	Cardiff		

== Legal battles ==
In December 2025, the Peterborough City Council was voted to sell freehold of the New England Complex that houses the Bharat Hindu Samaj, to reduce its debt. The City Council rejected the temple's £1.3 million offer in favour of a higher bid from the United Kingdom Islamic Mission, which planned to convert the building into a mosque. The temple brought a judicial review, arguing that the sale was procedurally unlawful and breached the council's Equality Act 2010 duties. In February 2026, Mr Justice Fordham granted an interim injunction blocking the sale. In July 2026, a full hearing before Mr Justice Morris concluded with judgment reserved.

== Overseas Territories ==
- Gibraltar Hindu Temple

== See also ==
- Lists of Hindu temples
- In 2020, Historic England (HE) published A Survey of Hindu Buildings in England with the aim of providing information about buildings that Hindus use in England so that HE can work with communities to enhance and protect those buildings now and in the future. The scoping survey identified 187 Hindu temples in England.
