= British Sri Lankans =

People living in Britain who can trace their origin back to Sri Lanka

- Distribution by regional area.

Total population
- Sri Lankan-born residents 67,938 (2001 census); 129,076 (2011 census); 147,195 (2021/22 census); Other population estimates 110,000 (2002 Berghof Research Center estimate); 170,000 (2007 Tamil Information Centre estimate); Ethnic Sri Lankans: 149,239 (England and Wales only, 2021); People with Sri Lankan descent 400,000 (2023)

Regions with significant populations
- London, South East England, East of England, Midlands

Languages
- Tamil, English, Sinhala

Religion
- Theravada Buddhism, Hinduism, Islam, Roman Catholicism, Protestantism

Related ethnic groups
- Sri Lankan

British Sri Lankans are an ethnic group referring to British people who can trace their ancestry to Sri Lanka. It can refer to a variety of ethnicities and races, including Tamils (by far the most numerous), Sinhalese, Moors/Muslims and Burghers. They may identify with a various labels including Asian, South Asian, Indian, British, and British Sri Lankan.

They live primarily in Southern England. Within London, they live primarily in West London, East London and South London (notably similar to the British Indian community). They have good social mobility and socioeconomic compared other ethnic groups, notably British Pakistani and British Bangladeshi. Sri Lanka was relatively socioeconomically advanced among its peers in the late 1900s and a majority of the Sinhalese immigrants were professionals. Nearly half of Tamil immigrants were degree holders which combined with a strong education ethic led to fortunate outcomes for the British-born children. The estimated average household size is 2.3.

== History ==
=== Ancient ===
Europe has known about the island of Sri Lanka since at least two millennia ago during the times of Ancient Greece and Ancient Rome. It was a major trade hub exporting luxury goods to Europe and Asia. Greek and Roman sources wrote about large sea-going ships built in Sri Lanka. It is implied that "western" vessels did not travel beyond the southern tip of the Indian subcontinent and left further voyage to local natives, who had substantial contact with the far-east, though knowledge of the ports beyond did exist.

Objects discovered at Sutton Hoo could suggest possible contact between Anglo-Saxon England and Sri Lanka, though it is not ascertained by what means the finds arrived in England. They included garnets used in jewelry pieces. King Alfred dispatched envoys to St Thomas and St Bartholomew shrines in Southern India in 833 AD (it isn't known whether they succeeded). Genetic studies showed that at least one individual with non-European ancestry was buried from 7th Century Kent, in England.

=== Modern ===
However the first Western Europeans to make substantial contact with Sri Lanka were the Portuguese during colonialism, followed by the Dutch and then finally the British. Sri Lankans have since been migrating to Britain for several centuries, up from the time of British ruled Ceylon.

Flag of British Ceylon. Many Sri Lankans have been migrating to Britain for several centuries, up from the time of British Rule.

There have been records of immigration from Ceylon to the UK during the 19th century. There are however no definitive records of the first Ceylonese to come to the UK. There was some presence of the Ceylonese during the 1810s. One notably, Adam Sri Munni Ratna, a Buddhist monk from Ceylon travelled to England in 1818 with his cousin while accompanying Sir Alexander Johnston to join the Methodist Church. However, they did not settle permanently in England and then returned to Ceylon where they entered government service. During the mid-late 19th century, many of the migrants from South Asia were the lascars who were sailors from British Colonies that worked on British ships and some of the sailors also come from the seafaring communities of Ceylon.

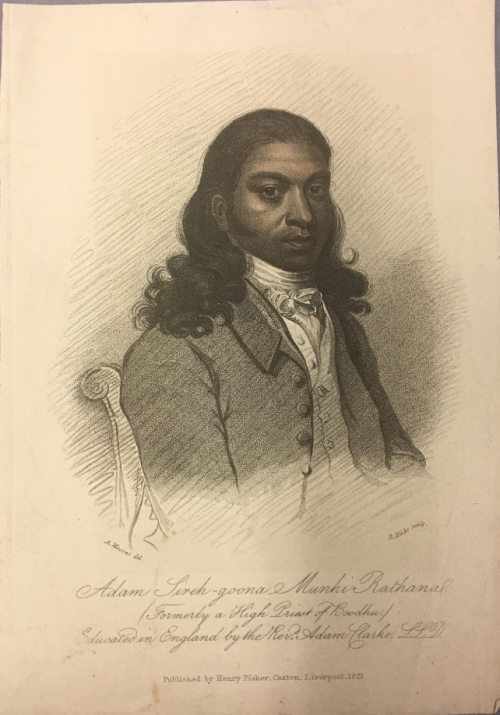
Adam Sri Munni Ratna, the Buddhist monk who came to England in 1818. By Robert Hicks, published by Henry Fisher, after Alexander Mosses hand-coloured stipple engraving, published 1821. Credit: British Library.

There were Ceylonese people from wealthy or high backgrounds who lived, studied and visited the UK during the 19th and early 20th centuries. These include people such as SWRD Bandaranaike, Sir John Kotelawala, Felix Reginald, Ananda Coomaraswamy and many others. Muthu Coomaraswamy, a Ceylon Tamil, became the first Asian knight after being knighted by Queen Victoria of the Order of St Michael and St George in 1878.

From the early 20th century, many people from Ceylon came to the UK as soldiers during WW1 when Ceylon sent 2,300 volunteers to the UK. There were also other reasons for Ceylonese migration to the UK before Independence. The Ceylonese also served as servants for wealthy British people such as Sir Thomas Lipton.

The UK censuses of 1891, 1901 and 1911 showed a number of people born in the colonies of India and Ceylon. The 1901 census showed that out of the 136,092 persons born in British Dependencies and Colonies, no fewer than 55,362 persons were born in India, Burma or Ceylon with contrasting figures of 50,929 in 1891. The 1911 census however shown 66,331 or 41 per cent of people born in parts of the Empire with 62,974 from India and 3,557 from Ceylon.

=== Post-Independence ===
Between the 1950s to the 1980s, the United Kingdom served as a major immigration destination for highly educated Sri Lankans, due to the relaxed immigration rules given to Sri Lankan citizens due to the politics surrounding post-Empire connections such as the Commonwealth of Nations.

This initial group of immigrants consisted of a settled group of people who followed a migration model of a single journey with a settled home at the end of it. Many of these people who came have become established in British society.

During the 1960s, understaffing in the UK's National Health Service opened up the opportunity for many Sri Lankans to become doctors and consultants; others managed to secure other white-collar jobs.

Before 1983, when the civil war started, social spaces for a Sri Lankan elite existed, there were hardly any ethnic boundaries and all ethnicities attended Sri Lankan High Commission receptions and the frequent intra-school sports competitions organized by Sri Lankan schools alumnae. During that time the public perceived the Sri Lankan community as one of the most successful immigrant communities in the UK. Especially during the 1970s, political organization increased among both Tamils and Sinhalese.

The onset of the Sri Lankan Civil War in the 1980s and 1990s caused a large-scale exodus of Tamils to countries in the West. The Sri Lankan Tamils who emigrated to the UK often came on student visas (or family reunion visas for the family of said people) due to the well-educated in Sri Lanka being literate in English. This resulted in the first generation diaspora falling into highly professional jobs such as medicine and law after studying at British educational facilities.

In 1991, Sri Lankans were the sixth biggest Asian community, with over 39,000 residents of Britain having been born in Sri Lanka.

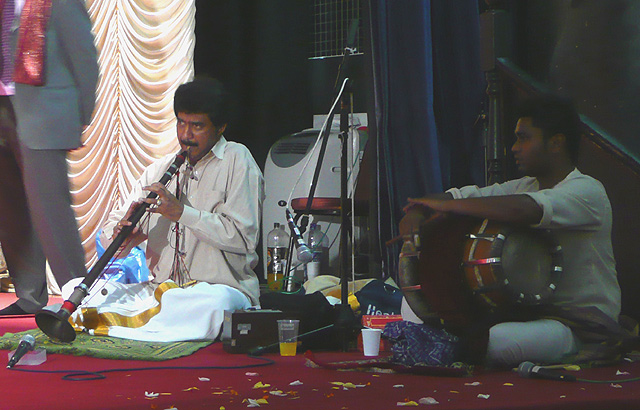
Sri Lankan musicians in London

=== 2000s ===
The children of first generation immigrants are a third grouping that have predominantly come-of-age in the late 2000s and 2010s. These children often grew up without siblings due to the low birth rates in the community, with one child for two parents being the norm, but they often faced better economic and cultural prospects than other similar refugee groups due to the strong education ethic imposed by Sri Lankan culture.

This grouping has been widely praised as hard-working, with little problems relating to criminality and anti-social behaviour, and high levels of educational achievement. A number of reports and articles has praised the community as "middle class" and "progressive".

== Culture ==
As Sri Lankans are similar to other South Asian communities in the UK it has often meant that Sri Lankans unknowingly assimilate into the local Asian cultures, particularly due to the small size of the Sri Lankan community, thanks to intermixing at shops and cultural centres such as temples.

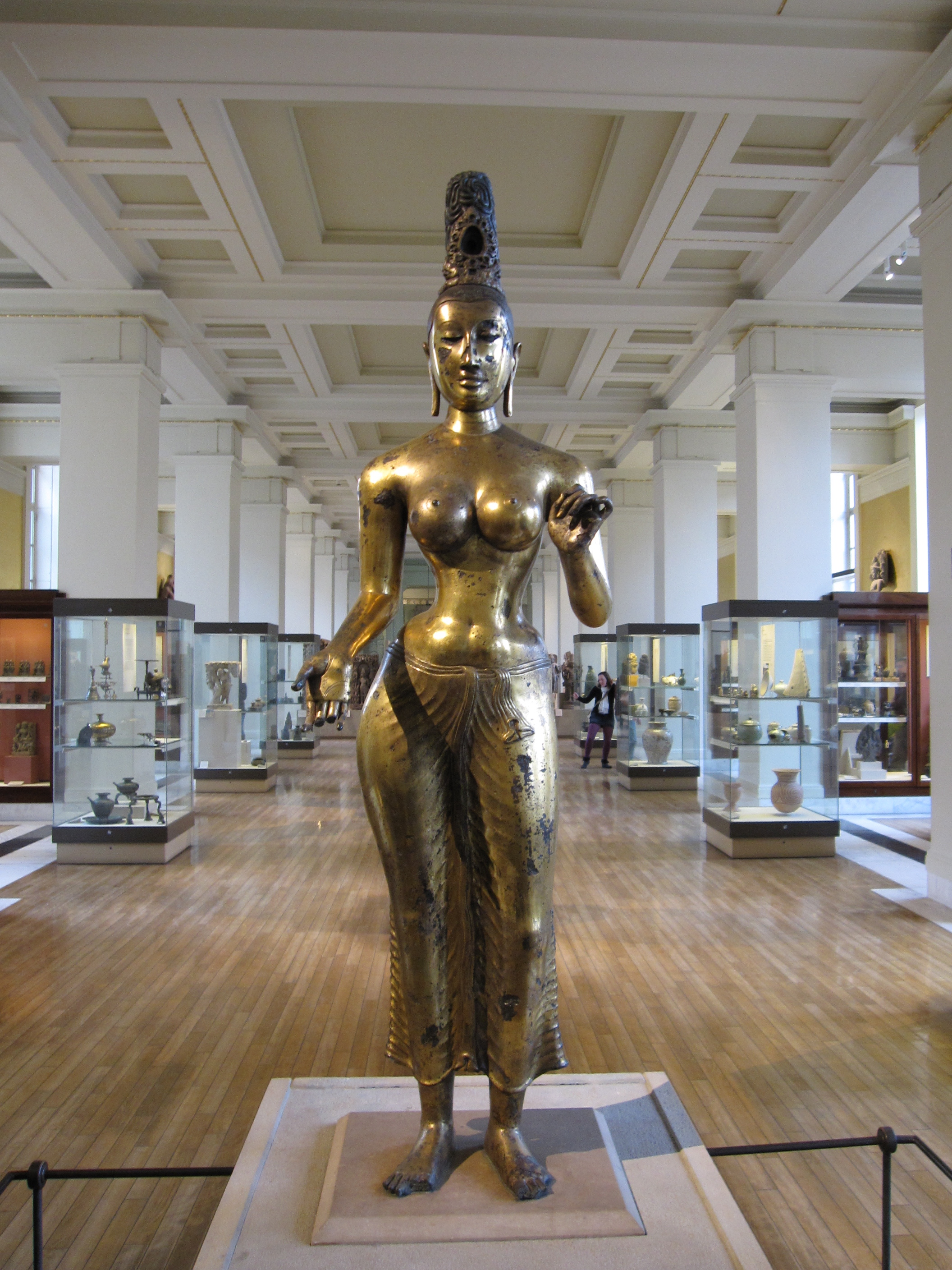
Tara, currently at the British Museum, shows evidence of the cultural interaction of Buddhism with Hinduism among Sri Lankas. She had been a Hindu mother goddess but was redesigned for a new role within Buddhism.

=== Religion ===
Sri Lankans in the United Kingdom predominantly come from Tamil heritage, so Hinduism is the most common religion among the community. However, there is a significant amount of Christians, primarily Roman Catholics.

Hinduism nevertheless continues to be a cultural rallying point for a sizeable amount of Sri Lankan Tamils. Several temples have been built throughout the UK to service the needs of Sri Lankan Tamils, including the Sivan Kovil and Murugan Kovil in West London, though these temples do not necessarily serve as community building organisations due to Hinduism's lack of requirement for temple visits. The community mainly follow the Saivite sect.

The smaller Sinhalese community has also been well served by a large network of Buddhist temples, including a major Sinhalese one at Kingsbury in London called Vihara, and six other prominent Sinhalese temples that have been ethnically linked to the community. "Though present London Buddhist Vihāra traces its birth to 1926, until the arrival of three Sri Lankan monks as residents in 1928, the premises in Ealing seems to have functioned as Headquarters of British Maha Bodhi Society."

There is a significant amount of Christians in both the Sinhalese and Tamil communities in the UK, covering at least 22.2% of British Sri Lankans according to the 2011 census. It would be likely that the early Sri Lankans in Britain would have been predominantly Christian, belonging to the Protestant denominations such as Anglicanism and Methodism. Examples include Sri Adam Munni Ratna, who traveled to England to enter Methodism in 1818, and Kamal Chunchie, who was a prominent Methodist minister in the East End of London in the 1920s, and who was of Sri Lankan Malay descent. Furthermore, people such as S.W.R.D. Bandaranaike and Felix Reginald came from Anglican families in Ceylon at the time, who would often stay in or visit the UK in the early 20th century. Some of the early Sri Lankans (or Ceylonese) would have come as lascars and like any other of those settled would have likely converted to Christianity if they were to integrate well. In 1951, there was a record of 6,447 individuals born in Ceylon living in Britain, many which are of European descent (likely Burgher people), likely following forms of Christianity. With the civil war and of the recent immigration of skilled workers, most of the Sri Lankan Christian population would have been made in correlation with the demographics in the current state of Sri Lanka, concluding that Roman Catholicism would nowadays be the majority of the Christian population. Overall, Christians form the largest religious minority in the community.

The religious breakdown of British Sri Lankans overall:

Religion	The percentage of British Sri Lankans from the 2011 England and Wales Census.
Hinduism	50.0%
Christianity	22.2%
Buddhism	15.4%
Islam	6.7%
Other religion	5.7%

=== Attitudes ===
==== Civil war ====
The political attitudes of the diaspora may vary. Some researchers have cited concern that organisations claiming to represent the communities may in-fact be unrepresentative.

Traditionally earlier emigrants from Sri Lanka distanced themselves from the activism of latter emigrants.

It has also been the case that more recent emigrants from Sri Lanka have taken more moderate or alternative positions on the civil war.

The Civil War has played a notable role in the political activists from the community. A variety of activist organisations have been established by first generation immigrants in order to claim to represent the voice of the Tamil community on the island, and several major protests have been held in order to forward various viewpoints surrounding the war.

The second generation have been described as being more emotionally detached from the politics of the civil war.

In 2008, it was reported in the BBC that there was at least a vocal minority of Sri Lankan Tamils fiercely opposed the separatist cause in the Civil War.

==== Islamophobia ====
Nationalist movements that align along the linguistic lines and religious lines of Sri Lanka are described as being exclusionary or hateful towards Muslims, though the Muslim community was largely "forgotten" during the civil war conflict and subjected to discrimination.

==== Political parties ====
The Sinhalese have been historically considered right-leaning, whereas the Tamils have been considered left-leaning, derived from the politics of Sri Lanka, though this distinction has not been so evident in recent decades, and the generations who grew up in the UK may follow domestic political concerns.

A research paper in The South Asianist noted that Sri Lankan Tamil Hindus and Sri Lankan Sinhalese Buddhists were very active in the respective Hindu and Buddhist communities of their host countries, underlying synergies with the diaspora Indian community.

== Demographics ==
Historical population
Year	Pop.	±%
1911	3,557	—
1921	3,880	+9.1%
1931	*	—
1941	*	—
1951	6,447	—
1961	*	—
1971	17,045	—
1981	26,172	+53.5%
1991	39,387	+50.5%
2001	67,938	+72.5%
2011	125,917	+85.3%
2021/22	147,195	+16.9%

A map showing the distribution of Sri Lankans in Greater London. Two-thirds of British Sri Lankans live in London. 0.0%-1.49% 1.5%-2.99% 3%-4.99% 5%-6.99% 7%-9.99% 10% and greater

The population of England, Scotland and Wales born in what was then Ceylon recorded by the first post-war census of 1951 was 6,447 individuals. While the 1971 census grew to 17,045, this figure grew to 26,172 in 1981 and 39,387 in 1991. The 2001 Census recorded 67,938 Sri Lankan-born UK residents. The 2011 census recorded 125,917 Sri Lankan-born residents in England, 1,325 in Wales, 1,711 in Scotland and 123 in Northern Ireland. The Tamil Information Centre had estimated that, as of 2007, 170,000 Sri Lankans were resident in the UK.

In the 2021 UK census, 141,861 people in England were recorded as having been born in Sri Lanka, as well as 2,435 in Wales, and 192 in Northern Ireland. The census in Scotland was delayed by a year until 2022 and recorded 2,707 residents born in Sri Lanka.

The largest community of Sri Lanka born immigrants live in London, with an estimated population of around 50,000 in 2001 and 84,500 in 2011, with smaller populations in South East England, the East of England, West and East Midlands.

The Sri Lankan diaspora has good social mobility and socioeconomics. The following table shows the average GCSE results in 2011:

Ethnicity	Difference from average (%) in 2011	Difference from average (%) in 2003
Chinese	+38%	+11%
Sri Lankan Tamil	+32.5%	+8%
Indian	+29.9%	+7%
Bangladeshi	+1.8%	-9.3
Average	0	0
White British	-2.3%	+1%
Pakistani	-8.6%	-11.3%
Somali	-23.7%	-22.3%

=== Tamils ===
The UK has always had a strong, albeit small, population of Sri Lankan Tamils deriving from colonial era immigration between Sri Lanka and the UK, but a surge in emigration from Sri Lanka took place after 1983, as the civil war caused living conditions to deteriorate and Tamils were genocided by the Sri Lankan army. It is now estimated that the current population of British Sri Lankan Tamils numbers around 100,000 to 200,000.

The largest population of British Sri Lankan Tamils can be found in London, chiefly in Harrow (West London), and East Ham (East London), and Tooting (South London). The community generally has far lower birth rates in comparison to other South Asian ethnic groups, with one child for two parents being the norm.

Unlike immigrants to countries in Continental Europe, the majority of Sri Lankan Tamils that went to live in Anglo-Saxon countries achieved entry through non-refugee methods such as educational visas and family reunion visas, owing to the highly educated in Sri Lanka being literate in English as well as Tamil. This resulted in the first generation diaspora falling into highly professional jobs such as medicine and law after studying at British educational facilities.

The result was that the community was perceived as being similar to the rest of the Indian community (see:Ugandan Indian Refugees) with a more middle class image.

=== Sinhalese ===
The main and oldest organisation representing the Sinhalese community in the UK are the UK Sinhala association. The newspaper Lanka Viththi was created in 1997 to provide a Sinhala newspaper for the Sinhalese community. The largest population of British Sri Lankan Sinhalese can be found in the north of London, mainly in Harrow, Neasden, and Willesden (North West London), and Hanwell (West London). In 2006, a Sinhala TV channel called Kesara TV was set up in London to provide the Sinhala-speaking people of the UK a TV channel in Sinhala.

The current Sinhalese community in the UK has arrived over the past 70 years since the end of the colonial era in Ceylon. They represent at least 3 generations with each of them being the immigrants, their children, and grandchildren.

=== Muslims ===
There are about 25,000+ Sri Lankan Muslims living in the United Kingdom.

== Notable British Sri Lankans ==
- Ranil Jayawardena, Secretary of State for Environment, Food and Rural Affairs (2022), a member of the Conservative Party, Member of Parliament for North East Hampshire (2015–2024)
- Ashan Pillai, violist and professor of viola
- Romesh Ranganathan, stand-up comedian, actor and presenter

== See also ==
- Sri Lankan diaspora
- Sri Lanka–United Kingdom relations
