= Sanskar Radio =

Hindu radio station in Leicester, United Kingdom

- Country: United Kingdom
- Availability: Leicester
- Owner: Sabras Sound Ltd
- Official website: sanskarradio.com

Hindu Sanskar Radio is a Hindu teachings based radio station broadcast from Leicester. It is run by volunteers and the local Hindu temples. It transmits on DAB Digital Radio and from its website. During Hindu religious festivals, it also transmits on analogue radio.
