= Sukhsagar Datta =

Indian doctor and political activist

- Born: 1890; Bengal, India
- Died: 3 November 1967 (aged 76–77); Bristol, England
- Education: Merchant Venturers' Technical College; University of Bristol, Medical School
- Occupations: Medical doctor and political activist
- Spouse: Ruby nee Young
- Children: Albion and David

Sukhsagar Datta, alias Sukha Sagar Datta (1890 – 3 November 1967), was a medical doctor and political activist, who was born in Bengal, India. In 1908, his brother, Ullasakar Datta, was arrested by the British Raj for revolutionary activities and sentenced to a long prison sentence. Fearing arrest himself, Sukhsagar fled to London, where he enrolled at the London Tutorial College and came into contact with members of the Bloomsbury Group. Around 1910-11 he met and fell in love with Ruby Young of Bristol, whom he then married. Following a failed attempt to become an actor, they moved to St Paul's in Bristol, where they had two sons: Albion and David.

In 1913 or 1914 Datta joined the Merchant Venturers' Technical College, where he passed exams that allowed him to join the University of Bristol Medical School in 1915. He qualified as a doctor on 22 October 1920. He joined Bristol General Hospital as a House Physician at a time when Indian doctors were very unusual in Britain. He went on to work for a variety of medical institutions in Bristol and also offered his services on a voluntary basis to the St John's Ambulance Brigade, who went on to award him for his lifelong services to the Brigade in 1959.

Datta remained committed to the cause of Indian Independence throughout his life, joining the Labour Party in 1926 in part because they were more sympathetic to this goal. He was also heavily involved with local politics, becoming Chairman of the Bristol Labour Party (1946) and President of the Bristol Trades Council (1946-7).

During the 1930s Datta joined the London-based India League, which became an official branch of the Indian National Congress that was campaigning for Indian Independence. In 1944 Datta was instrumental to the Labour Party passing a resolution to support Indian Independence. This became a reality in 1947, following Labour's victory in the 1945 general election.

Datta retired in 1956 and went on a six-month tour of India with his wife, Ruby. He died in Bristol on 3 November 1967, following a heart attack. His wife and two sons survived him.
