= Bharat Hindu Samaj Mandir =

Spiritual and cultural Mandir dedicated to harmony

Bharat Hindu Samaj

Religion
- Affiliation: Hinduism
- Status: Active

Location
- Location: Peterborough Cambridgeshire, England United Kingdom

Bharat Hindu Samaj (BHS) is a Hindu temple and community centre in Peterborough, Cambridgeshire, England. The temple was built by families expelled from Uganda under dictator Idi Amin. The temple is registered as a charity in England and Wales, it has operated from the New England Complex on Rock Road since 1986, serving worshippers from Peterborough and the surrounding counties of Cambridgeshire, Norfolk, Lincolnshire and Leicestershire.

Since 2025 the organisation has been claimant in a judicial review against Peterborough City Council over the council's decision to sell the freehold of the building to the United Kingdom Islamic Mission (UKIM) which plans to redevelop it as a mosque and Islamic community centre.

== History ==
The temple was established at the New England Complex, a former school building on Rock Road, in 1986. The temple was established by families who were ousted by Ugandan dictator Idi Amin. It is registered with the Charity Commission for England and Wales. The charity's governing constitution was adopted on 15 November 1974, and the charity itself was formally registered on 24 October 1977.

=== Community and activities ===
The temple functions both as a place of worship and wider community hub, running social and educational activities during the week, including a lunch club for elderly member and charity outreach work. It shares its site with several other tenants. In January 2024, several hundred worshippers gathered at the temple to mark the consecration of the Ram Mandir in Ayodhya, India.Press estimates the temple serves around 13,000 to 14,000 people approximately.

=== Governance ===
Bharat Hindu Samaj is classified by the Charity Commission under religious activities, the provision of building and services, and charitable purposes benefitting people of a particular ethnic or racial origin. For the financial year ending 31 March 2025, it reported total income of £159,699 and expenditure of £69,766 with 17 trustees and 17 volunteers.

== Legal dispute ==
=== Background ===
Peterborough City Council, the freehold owner of the site, decided to sell the property to help reduce its debts. Bharat Hindu Samaj, a long-standing tenant, had been in negotiations with the council over the site since 2011 and tabled a bid of £1.3 million to buy it outright. In December 2025, the council's cabinet selected an undisclosed preferred bidder instead. This decision was formally "called in" for scrutiny the following month on the grounds it had been made without enough information and referred back to cabinet. The cabinet met again on 10 February 2026 and voted to proceed with the sale, while saying it would help the temple find alternative premises. Court documents later seen by the BBC confirmed the buyer to be Khadija Mosque, part of the United Kingdom Islamic Mission.

=== Judicial review ===
On 27 February 2026, Mr Justice Fordham of the High Court's Administrative Court (King's Bench Division) granted an interim injunction preventing the council from taking or encouraging any other party to take, any "irreversible step" toward disposing of the site while litigation proceeded. The order named the council as defendant and Majid Khadijah/ the Islamic Centre of Khadijah Mosque as interested parties. The council said it would engage with the legal process; a mosque spokesperson said it would not be appropriate to comment on the detail while proceedings continued, adding that its focus remained on "acting responsibly, supporting community cohesion, and working constructively with the council and all affected parties."

The case proceeded before Mr Justice Morris in the High Court. At a hearing beginning around 10 June 2026, counsel for the temple, Toby Fisher argued the council's process contained "significant flaws" in officers' reasoning and that the cabinet's subsequent adoption of the decision amounted to an unlawful delegation of the bidding decision and that council breached the Equality Act 2010 given the "dramatic impact" losing the temple would have on the Hindu community, which had no alternative premises, compared with UKIM's roughly 40 centres and 60 branches nationally. Counsel for the council, Catherine Rowlands, argued there was no evidence councillors had been misled or that any unlawful delegation of powers occurred, and that the temple's arguments "lack merit and ought to be dismissed". A further court order dated 7 July 2026 noted that the case had "already attracted media attention and the attention of members of the public." The hearings concluded on 16 July 2026, and the judgment remains reserved.
