= Shri Venkateswara (Balaji) Temple =

Hindu temple in Birmingham, United Kingdom

Coordinates: 52°30′48″N 2°01′48″W

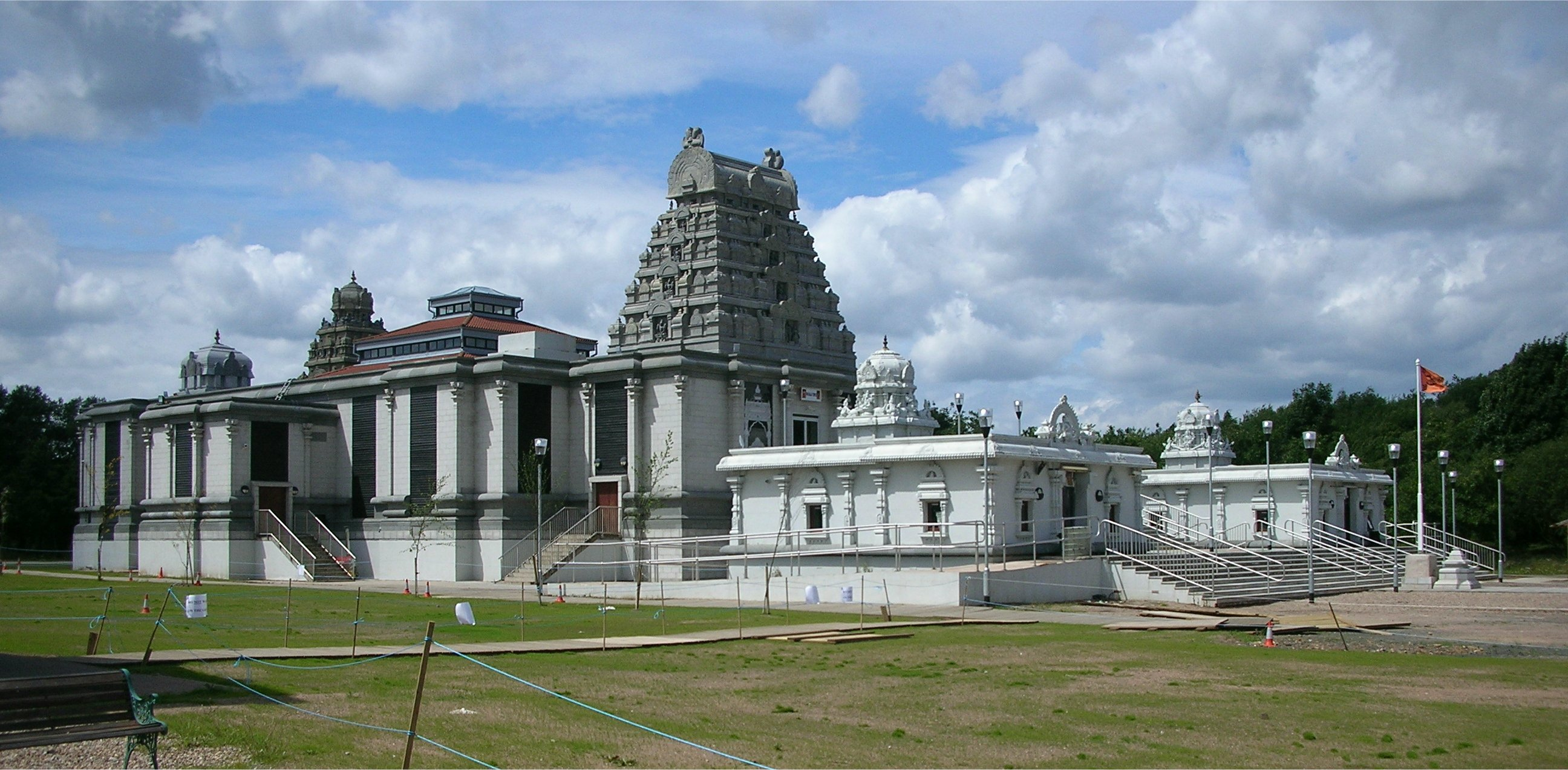
- Shri Venkateswara (Balaji) Temple, 2007

Religion
- Affiliation: Hinduism
- Deity: Venkateswara

Location
- Location: Tividale, Birmingham, West Midlands
- Country: United Kingdom
- Interactive map of Shri Venkateswara (Balaji) Temple

Architecture
- Established: 2006

Website
- www.venkateswara.org.uk

The Shri Venkateswara (Balaji) Temple is a Hindu temple located on a 30-acre (12 ha) site in Tividale, a suburb of Birmingham in the United Kingdom. It is dedicated in the Vaishnava tradition to Venkateswara, a form of the Hindu god Vishnu. The temple was inspired by the Tirupati Venkateswara Temple in Andhra Pradesh, India. It was opened in 2000 and consecrated in 2006.

== History ==
In the 1970s, Vaishnavite Telugu migrants living in the Birmingham area originally gathered to worship Venkateswara at the Gujarati-run temple Shree Geeta Bhawan Mandir in the Handsworth neighbourhood of Birmingham.

The site for the construction of the temple was donated by the Black Country Development Corporation in 1987. Construction began in 1997 following years of fundraising, with a reported £6.5 million provided by donations from worshippers and a Millennium Commission grant. The temple opened in 2000 and was consecrated in 2006.

== Temple design and deities ==
The temple was designed as a replica of the Tirupati Tirumala temple in Tirupati, Andhra Pradesh, India. According to the temple's trustees, at the time of its opening it covered the largest land area of any temple in Europe. The main deity venerated at the temple is Venkateswara. The outdoor stairway leading to the main gopuram has two smaller temples dedicated to other gods at its sides, one to Vinayaka (Ganesha) and the other to Murugan (Kartikeya). Other gods enshrined at the temple include the Navagraha and Shiva as well as Hanuman and Lakshmi.

The temple grounds also contain an educational centre, the Gandhi Peace Centre. The Centre contains materials for learning yoga and meditation, a library, and a permanent exhibition on the life and philosophy of Mahatma Gandhi.

== Operations ==
The temple commemorates the cultural festivals of the major South Indian cultural groups (the Telugu, Tamil, Malayali, and Kannada peoples) as well as more broadly Indian festivals such as Deepavali (Diwali). It employs both Vaishnavite and Shaivite priests and commemorates deities and celebrations from both traditions. It is a non-profit organisation and is a recognized charity in the UK.
