= London Sri Mahalakshmi Temple =

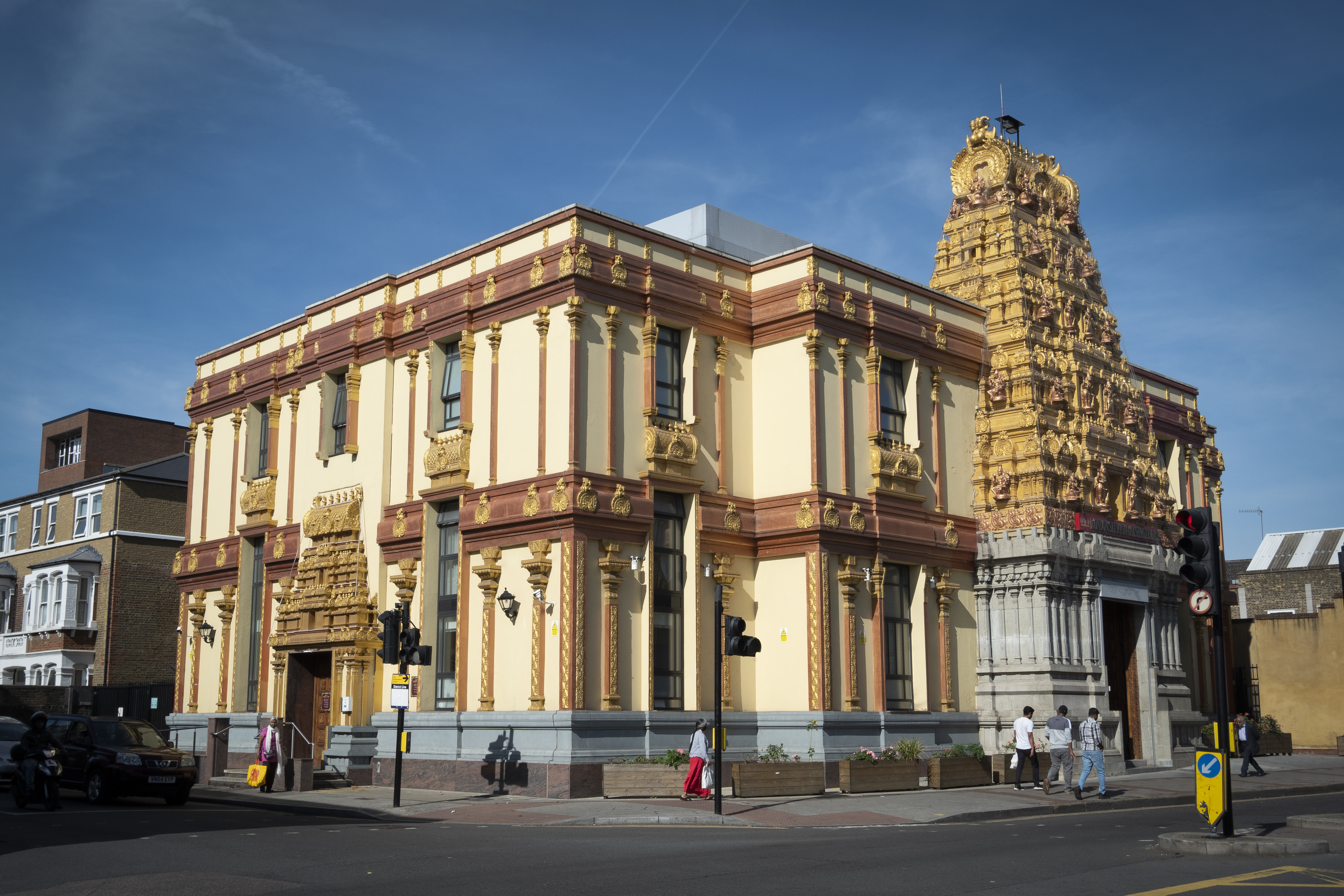
- London Sri Mahalakshmi Temple, Manor Park, London Borough of Newham, East London, Greater London, United Kingdom

- Sri Mahalakshmi Temple, Manor Park, London Borough of Newham, East London, Greater London, United Kingdom

Religion
- Affiliation: Hinduism
- Deity: Mahalakshmi

Location
- Location: High Street North, East Ham, Manor Park, London Borough of Newham, East London, Greater London
- Country: United Kingdom
- Coordinates: 51.5404°N 0.0504°E

Architecture
- Type: Dravidian architecture
- Completed: 2010

Specifications
- Temple: One
- Elevation: 6.85 m (22 ft)

London Sri Mahalakshmi Temple is an Amman temple in the Manor Park area of London Borough of Newham in East London of Greater London in United Kingdom.

== Temple details ==
This temple is dedicated to goddess Mahalakshmi. The temple was constructed in the year 1989 and the consecration was performed in the year 1990. The temple was built by the Lakshmi Narayana trust in East Ham. Under the supervision of Padmashri Silpakalamani Muthiah Sthapathi, this temple's Royal tower and the other structures were built.

== Location ==
Sri Mahalakshmi Temple is located with the coordinates of (51.5404°N 0.0504°E) at Manor Park, in East Ham, London.

London Sri Mahalakshmi Temple (Greater London)

== Other deities ==
Srinivasa with his consorts Sridevi and Bhoodevi, Sahasramahalingeswarar, Gayatri, Saneeswarar, Raja Maha Ganapathy, Arupadai Murugan with His consorts Valli and Devasena, Sudarshana, Yoganarasimha and Hanuman are the other deities in this temple.
