= Shree Ghanapathy Temple, Wimbledon =

Hindi temple in Wimbledon, England

Coordinates: 51°25′24″N 0°11′21″W

Shree Ghanapathy Temple, Wimbledon, London
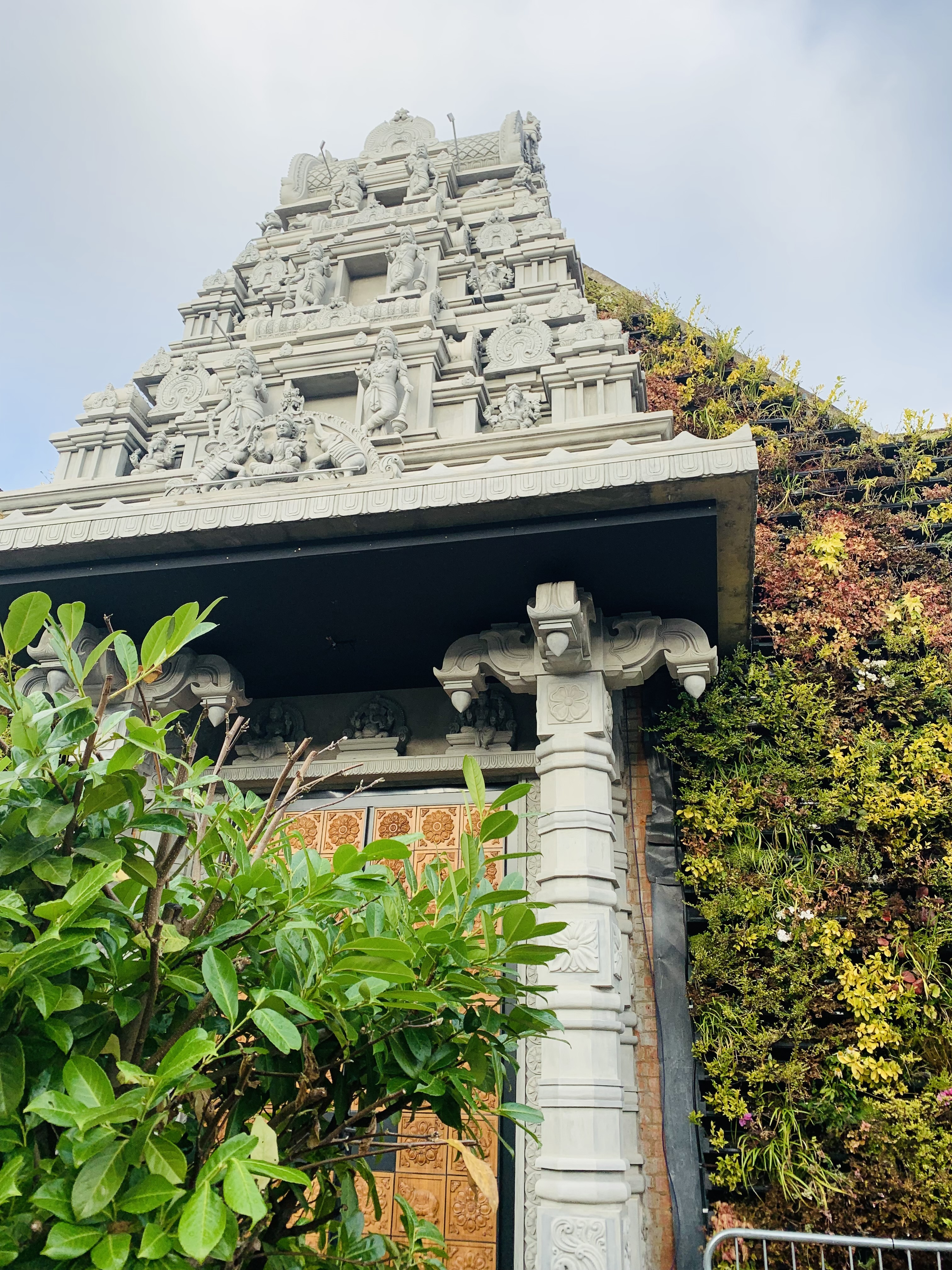

- Location in Greater London

Religion
- Affiliation: Hinduism

Location
- Location: Wimbledon
- Country: England

Website
- https://ghanapathy.co.uk/

Shree Ghanapathy Temple, Wimbledon, is a Hindu temple in south-west London, England, that was established in the 1980s. The main deity in the temple is of Lord Ganesha. There are also deities of Goddess Durga (Parvati), Lord Hanuman, Krishna etc. The Sai Mandir was opened in 1981 and is a prayer hall dedicated to Bhagavan Sri Sathya Sai Baba.

It was the first fully consecrated Hindu temple in Europe (1981).

During the temple's early years, the realisation came that there was an urgent need to educate the younger generation about Hinduism. Furthermore, the temple wanted the children to fully understand the faith at a deeper level than previously. Therefore, the Sai Mandir has been running classes for many years, teaching the children spiritual education, Sanskrit prayers, how to sing Bhajans (devotional hymns) in addition to learning about other religions too. Voluntary activities take place in affiliation with local authorities and Age Link groups.

The temple provides classes dwelling on teachings of Hinduism, music and dance classes, and yoga to name a few.

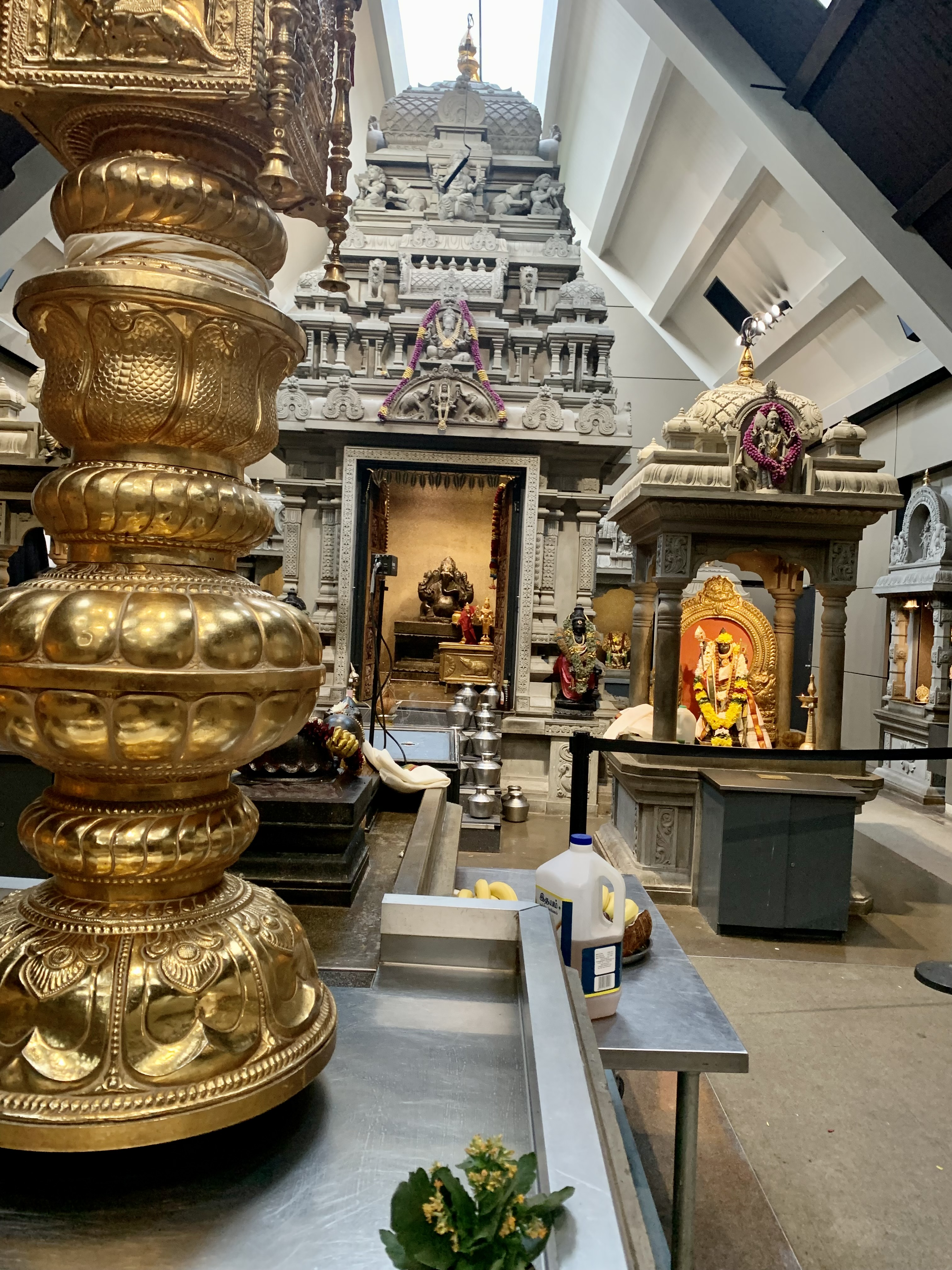
Ghanapathy Mandir at Shree Ghanapathy Temple, Wimbledon

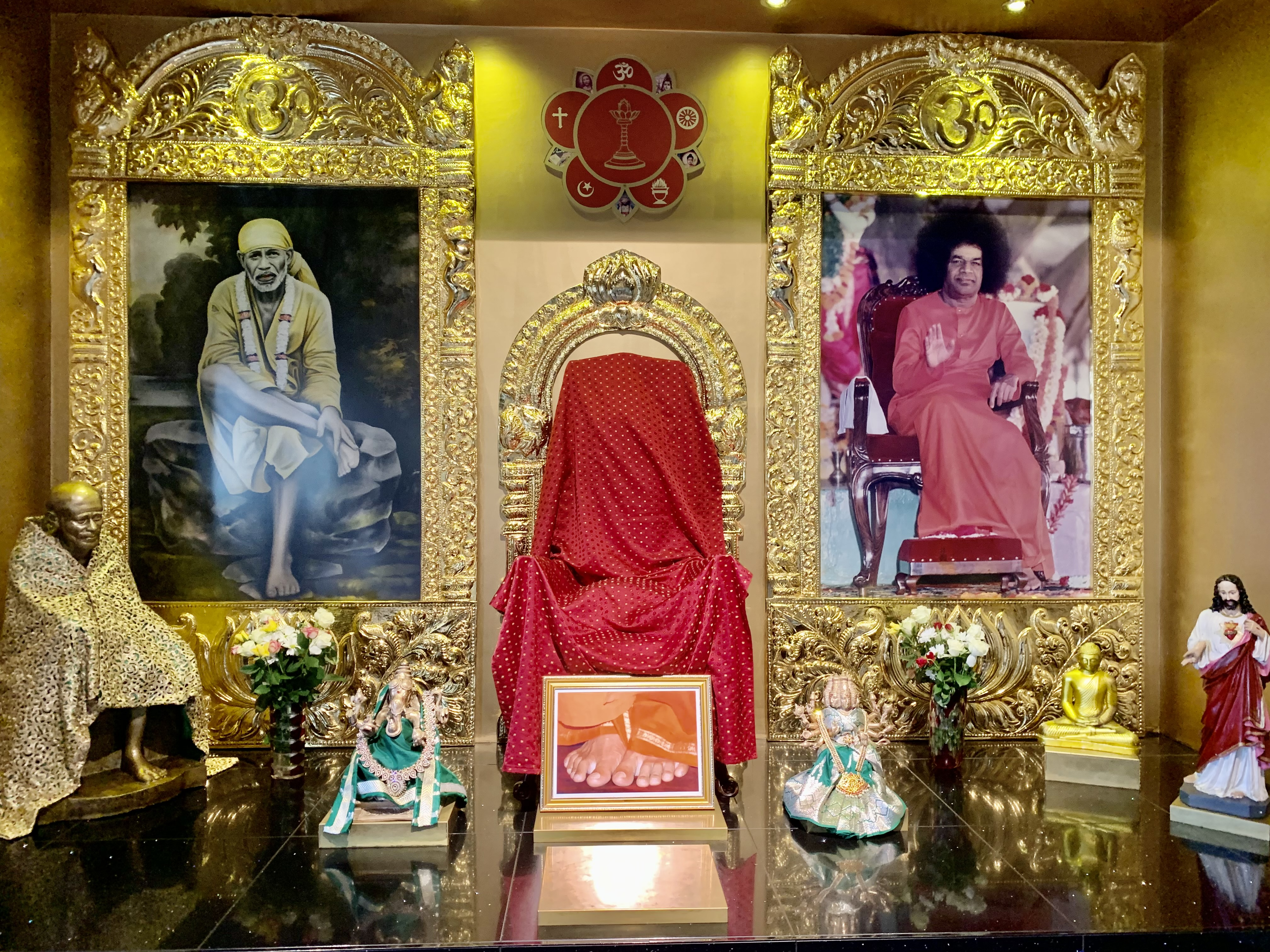
Sai Mandir at Shree Ghanapathy Temple, Wimbledon

== Community ==
Shelter for Refugees Refugees from Sri Lanka have been given temporary shelter at the Temple in 1986. The BBC recorded this info as part of their DomesDay Project in 1986.

Scouts - 23rd Wimbledon This temple became Europe's first Hindu temple in the UK to be home to a Scout Group. The 23rd Wimbledon was established by Scout Leader, Geetha Maheshwaran in Autumn 2012 .

School trips - Religious Education The school is listed in Merton Council Directory as providing Hindu religious, social and cultural services for all ages, especially for schools to visit as part of their teaching of Hinduism in their Religious Education Curriculum.

== Renovations ==
The Ganesh temple has been using a building that was formally a Church and a Community Centre. Hence the interior has been a basic square shape. Reconstruction work began in early 2014, and is nearing completion in January 2015. It will be based more on the style of the traditional South Indian temples.
