= London Sri Murugan Temple =

Murugan temple in London, United Kingdom

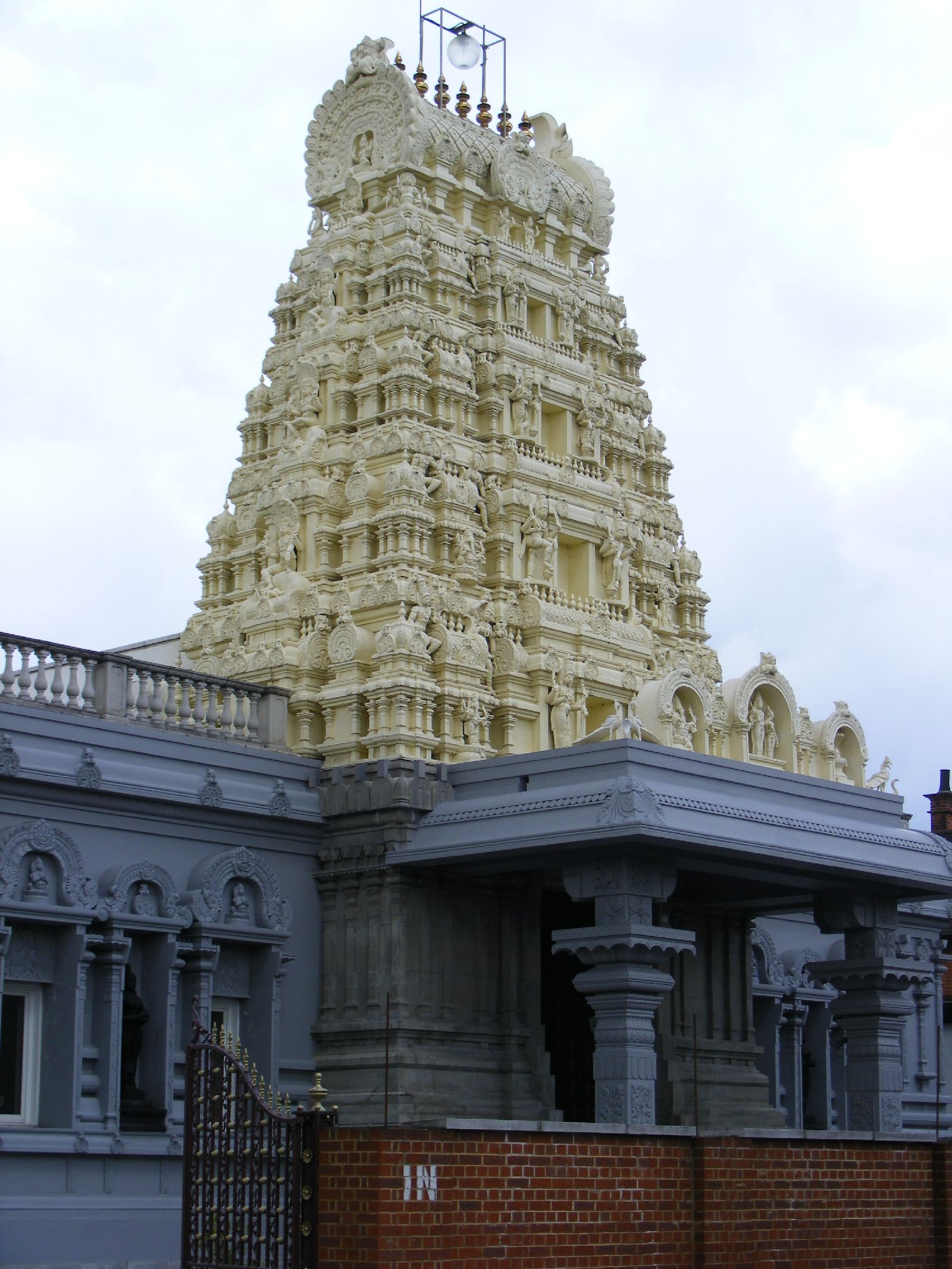
- London Sri Murugan Temple, Manor Park, London Borough of Newham, East London, Greater London, United Kingdom

- Sri Murugan Temple, Manor Park, London Borough of Newham, East London, Greater London, United Kingdom

Religion
- Affiliation: Hinduism
- Deity: Murugan
- Festival: Skanda Shashti

Location
- Location: Church/Browning Road, Manor Park, London Borough of Newham, East London, Greater London
- Country: United Kingdom
- Interactive map of London Sri Murugan Temple
- Coordinates: 51.5479°N 0.0566°E

Architecture
- Type: Dravidian architecture
- Completed: 1984

Specifications
- Temple: One
- Elevation: 7 m (23 ft)

Website
- https://www.londonsrimurugan.org.uk

London Sri Murugan Temple is a Murugan temple situated at Manor Park area of London Borough of Newham in East London of Greater London in United Kingdom. The presiding deity in this temple is Murugan. He appears here with His consorts Valli and Devasena. This temple is constructed with marbles in Dravidian structure.

Every year, the temple conducts Chariot Festival in the month of August.

== Location ==
This temple is located with the coordinates of (51.5479°N 0.0566°E) on Church/Browning Road at Manor Park area.

London Sri Murugan Temple (Greater London)

== Sub deities ==
Established as a charity in the year 1975 and constructed as a small temple and consecrated in February 1984 and renovated with a 50-feet Royal temple tower with the present building structure in May 2005, this temple has the sub deities such as Venkateswara, Mahalakshmi, Bhuvaneshwar, Nataraja, Bhuvaneshvari, Jeya Durga, Dakshinamurti, Anantha Vinayagar, Subramaniar with his consorts Valli and Devasena, Shanmugar, Ayyappan, Guruvayurappan, Anjaneyar, Agastya, Arunagirinathar, Sun, Moon, Navagraha, Idumban, Bhairava and Baba Balak Nath.
