= Shree Jalaram Prarthana Mandal =

Hindu mandir in Leicester

Coordinates: 52.6286°N 1.1497°W

Shree Jalaram Prarthana Mandal is a Hindu temple dedicated to Jalaram Bapa who was an Indian saint, located on Narborough Road in the West End of Leicester, England. According to the official website, the foundation stone was laid on a Monday.

In December 2016, over 50 people from the South Asian community were identified as being at high risk of having Diabetes after a screening held at the temple.
