= Cultureshock at the 2002 Commonwealth Games =

Cultural programme at the Commonwealth Games

Cultureshock was the Commonwealth Games cultural programme which ran alongside the Games themselves. The events ranged from images of the athlete as hero in sculpture and photography (Go! Freeze, which ran at Turton Tower in Bolton) to a Zulu performance at The Lowry. There was an exhibition at the Whitworth Art Gallery called Tales of Power: West African Textiles, and a performance of the film Monsoon Wedding at Clwyd Theatr Cymru. The geographical range was from Cheshire in the south to Blackburn and Cumbria in the north, and included that year the various Melas that take place around the region.

The full programme for Cultureshock is detailed below:

== March 2002 ==
- 1 March – 15 October – Commonwealth Gold, Rochdale Borough Festival 2002
- 3 March – International Women's Day Festival, Manchester Town Hall
- 4 March – Celebrate Commonwealth Gold Rochdale Town Hall
- 9 March – Go Freeze, Turton Tower, Bolton
- 10 March – Urban Grooves from the Commonwealth, Bridgewater Hall, Manchester
- 11 March – Common-wealth, Manchester Metropolitan University
- 11–16 March, English National Ballet – Romeo & Juliet, Manchester Opera House
- 12–13 March – 3 Shades, Bluecoat Arts Centre
- 13–18 March – Tara Arts – Journey to the West:The Trilogy, Contact Theatre
- 14 March – Trio Phoenix, Royal Northern College of Music
- 14 March – Manchester Stories New Forms Vol 3, St Annes Church
- 15 March – Rais Academy – Tales of the Past, Deeplish Community Centre
- 17 March – Phil Bateman, More than Gold, Salvation Army Rochdale
- 21 March – Trajets, Green Room, Manchester
- 23 March – Tony Allen's Afro Beat, Band on the Wall, Manchester
- 23 March – October – Tales of Power: West African Textiles, Whitworth Art Gallery
- 24 March – Opera Rara – Elisabetta regina d'Inghilterra, Banqueting House, Whitehall
- 27 March – The Mighty Zulu Nation – Africa Africa, The Lowry
- 30 March – Srijani Quartet, Liverpool Philharmonic Hall
- March onwards – Textile Identities:Littoral Textiles, Manchester Airport

== April 2002 ==
- 1 April – Easter Bank Holiday Market, Castlefield
- 1 April – Burnley Blues Festival, Pinetop Perkins, Matt Schofield Band, Burnley Mechanics.
- 3–30 April – Project by Suki Chan: Mondays was Washday, Turnpike Gallery
- 6 April – Indian Association presents Cultural Journey Through Folk Dances of Bharat, Wythenshawe Forum Manchester
- 7 April – Gear up for the Games Exhibition Salford Museum and Art Gallery
- 8 April – Poetry in Motion, Wigan Library
- 11 April – Hanif Kureishi's "My Beautiful Laundrette", Cornerhouse
- 12–14 April – Festival of Bangladeshi Art & Culture, Bangladesh House
- 13 April – "Storm", a new play by Lemn Sissay, Contact Theatre
- 13 April – 27 October – "Moving Lives" exhibition at the People's History Museum
- 15 April – Neil Ardley's "Kaleidoscope of Rainbows", Royal Northern College of Music
- 22–27 April – "The Island" by Athol Fugard, John Kani and Winston Nishona, The Lowry
- 25–27 April – Spirit of Youth in Music Festival, Rochdale
- 25 April – Imagine Asia 2002 Film Festival, Liverpool Philharmonic Hall
- 27 April – Music for the Mind and Soul, Liverpool Philharmonic Hall
- 27 April – Iqbal Poetry Evening, Pakistani Community Centre Manchester
- 27 April – Black Umfolosi, Burnley Mechanics
- 28 April – Sam Yo!, The Lowry
- 30 April – 2 May – Mira Nair's "Monsoon Wedding", Clwyd Theatr Cymru

== May 2002 ==
- 2 May – Tickle Bounce & Fun Time: Books for Babies, Tonge Moor Library, Bolton
- 4 May – 30 June – Gateway to the Commonwealth exhibition, The Promenade, The Lowry
- 9 May – Bradshaw and its Textile Industries, Harwood Library, Bolton
- 9–11 May – Angela de Castro's "Yo Yo", Manchester Royal Exchange
- 9–18 May – Kevin Gilbert's "The Cherry Pickers", performed by Sydney Theatre Company, Manchester Library Theatre
- 10 May – 12 October – See It Live in Bolton Festival
- 10–11 May – The Guide Association Lancashire Border presents "Songs and Dance of the Commonwealth"", Victoria Hall, Bolton
- 11 May – 23 June – "Spectator Sport" exhibition, Cornerhouse
- 21 May – Author Ruth Hamilton at the Lecture Theatre, Bolton
- 16 May – Moniza Alvi reads "The Other Room", Manchester Central Library
- 16–17 May – Compagnie Flak present "Perfume de Gardenias", Contact Theatre
- 16 May – 22 June – Queer up North festival
- 16 May – 28 July – "Reading the Games", programme of eventsin Manchester Libraries
- 18 May – Trilok Gurtu and Nitin Sawhney, Contact Theatre
- 19 May – 14 July – A Season of World Music at the Lowry
- 21 May – Nitin Sawhney and MJ Cole, Barbirolli Room, Bridgewater Hall
- 24–28 May – Linton Kwesi Johnson at Everyman Theatre Liverpool, Picture House Hebden Bridge and Manchester Library Theatre
- 24 May – 1 June – Amani Naphtali's "Ragamuffin", Contact Theatre
- 25 May – 17 July – "A Wealth in Common" exhibition, Bury Art Gallery and Museum
- 26 May – Bolton Hindu Forum Community Festival, Bolton Indian Sports & Recreation Club, Darcy Lever
- 26 May – Indoor League Pub Olympics, Cornerhouse Cafe Bar
- 28 May – Mica Paris, Barbiroilli Room, Bridgewater Hall
- 28 May – Central Band of the White Russian Army, Tameside Hippodrome
- 28 May – Sibongile Khumalo, at the Lowry
- 30 May – 8 June – Com.art.02 at Zion Arts Centre, Manchester
- 31 May – Bolton Youth Concert Band Concert in celebration of the Queen's Golden Jubilee, Albert Halls, Bolton

== June 2002 ==
- 1 June – Streetlife, Bolton Town Centre
- 8 June – 20 July – "Spotlight:Paintings by the Singh Twins, Mid Pennine Gallery, Burnley
- 13 June – Bob Phillips book signing, Commonwealth Games Store, The Arndale Centre
- 13 June – Creative Commonwealths: Cinema Culture & Community in the Age of Globalisation, The Cornerhouse
- 14–30 June – An exhibition of the Postal History of the Commonwealth Games, Manchester Town Hall
- 15–16 June – Aqua-Pura Commonwealth Trials, City of Manchester Stadium
- 16 June – 3 August – Bolton's Festival of Cycling 2002
- 17 June – Andrew Motion In Conversation, Manchester Central Library
- 17–23 June – Literatures of the Commonwealth Festival
- 18 June – 20 August – Visible Cities exhibition, Cube Art Gallery
- 20 June – Jamaican poet Lorna Goodison, Manchester Central Library
- 20 June – Gay Commonwealth Panel, discussion including novelist and critic Paul Bailey, New Zealand poet John Galtas, Scots poet David Kinloch, fiction writer Adam Mars-Jones, Canadian poet Norman Sacuta and Egyptian-born Ghanaian poet Gregory Woods, Manchester Central Library
- 22 June – Design a T-shirt competition, Commonwealth Games Store Arndale
- 22–27 June – Carnival Messiah, West Yorkshire Playhouse, Leeds
- 22 June – 2 October – "Swim" – an exhibition about the Culture of Moving in Water – Turton Tower, Bolton
- 23 June – Children's Workshop: Explore the Commonwealth, The Green Room
- 25–29 June – David Hermanstein's "A Caribbrean Abroad", Manchester Library Theatre
- 26 June – Prayer Network presents "Manchester: City of the Moment", The Lowry
- 27 June – A Taste of New Zealand, Museum Gallery, Bolton
- 28 June – 7 July – Commonwealth Film Festival
- 29 June – One World Festival 2002, New Mills
- 29 June – 21 July – Keyfest festival

== July 2002 ==
- 1–10 July – "Athletics Inspirations", Whitworth Park Manchester
- 2 July – Opening of Touchstones Rochdale
- 2–15 July – Mushaira Shakeup, Dynamic Poetry Showcase of South Asian Women poets (including Mansoora Ahmed, Gagan Gill, Parm Kaur and Shamshad Khan
- 3 July – Joe Pemberton reads "Forever and Ever Amen", Manchester Central Library
- 5 July – Cubanite at The Lowry
- 6 July – Barracudas Carnival Band, Ulverston Carnival, Ulverston
- 7 July – Working Woodlands Festival, Moses Gate Country Park, Farnworth
- 7 July – Westhoughton Show, Central Park, Westhoughton
- 8 July – Cauvery Madhavan, Levenshulme Library, Levenshulme
- 9 July – 14 September – "Shikor a phool (Roots and Blossom), Gallery Oldham
- 10 July – 13 September – Sri Lanka Crafty Thoughts, University of Liverpool Art Gallery
- 11 July – John Kinsella, Manchester Central Library
- 11 July – 14 September – Pakistan Threads Dreams and Desires, Harris Museum and Art Gallery, Preston
- 13 July – Rochdale Mela
- 13 July – recital by classic guitarist Neil Smith, St Katherines Church Horwich
- 13 July – East Feast Fringe Festival, Corpus Christi Social Centre, Miles Platting
- 13 July – Kakatsitsi:Master Drummers from Ghana, Chester Summer Music Festival
- 13 July – Bolton Symphony Orchestra concert, The Albert Hall Bolton
- 13 July – Youth Festival 2002, St Thomas's Park Stockport
- 13–26 July – "Pulse", Bridgewater Hall
- 13–28 July – Gloucester Summer Festival 2002
- 13 July – 1 September – New Indian Art, Manchester Art Gallery
- 13 July – 15 September – Conquer the Maize Maze, Redhouse Farm, Dunham Massey
- 14 July – Abdullah Ibrahim and the NDR Big Band, Bridgewater Hall
- 14 July – Rebecca Malope at the Lowry
- 15 July – Anoushka Shankar on the sitar, Bridgewater Hall
- 15–20 July – Commonwealth Bridge Championships, Whitworth Hall, Manchester University
- 16 July – 14 September – Bollywood greats, Blackburn Museum & Art Gallery
- 17 July – Evelyn Glennie and the Halle Orchestra, Bridgewater Hall
- 17 July – Stella Osammor presents African Fables for Children, Manchester Central Library
- 18 July – "Are You Waltzing? Matilda", Leigh Library
- 19 July – North West Steel Band Association Festival 2002, Zion Arts Centre, Hulme
- 19–22 July – 12th Commonwealth International Sport Conference, Manchester Metropolitan University
- 19 July – 3 August – Duke of Edinburgh's Award International Youth Exchange with Swaziland
- 20 July – Spirit-International Festival of Music & Arts, Cannon Hill Park, Birmingham
- 20 July – A Common Wealth of Music, Birch Community Centre, Rusholme
- 20–21 July – Aquafest Commonwealth Angling Competition, Ashton and Rochdale Canals, Sport City
- 21 July – Abasindi and the National Dance Company of Ghana, RHS Flower Show, Tatton Park
- 21 July – Variety 2002 An Overture for the Commonwealth, The Lowry (inclucing Diane Modahl, Zingari Swing and The Sixties Tiller Girls
- 21 July – Together as One, Chester Tree Festival, Alexandra Park, Chester
- 21 July – 3 August – Bolton Town Centre Heritage Tours
- 21 July – 5 August – Commonwealth Games Special Guided Tours, Manchester
- 22–26 July – Traditional Chinese Art Exhibition, Central Hall Manchester
- 22–28 July – C-C- 2002, Heywood
- 23–24 July – Loud & Visible, Youth Arts..shock!, Zion Arts Centre, Hulme
- 24 July – Michael Nyman meets Indian Masters in Sangam, The Lowry
- 24 July – 10 August – Noël Coward's "Design for Living", Royal Exchange Theatre
- 25 July – Euforia 2002, Pierhead Liverpool
- 25–28 July – Catch the Spirit of the Games at Bupa's Mind Body and Soul zone at Cathedral Gardens
- 25 July – 4 August – Festival Live, various venues around Manchester City Centre
- 26 July – Spirit of Friendship Royal Gala Concert, featuring Kiri te Kanawa, Bridgewater Hall
- 26 July – 23 August – Chinwe – An Exhibition for the Commonwealth Games, Manchester Central Library
- 27 July – Oldham Mela
- 27 July – Kevin Davy's Commonwealth Jam, Band on the Wall
- 27–28 July – Littleborough Rushbearing
- 28 July – Bolton Mela Festival
- 28 July – Asian Literature & Arts Festival, Longsight Library, Manchester
- 28 July – Songs of Praise for the Commonwealth Games, St Ann's Church, Manchester
- 28 July – Songs from the Commonwealth by Renaissance, Bramall Hall, Stockport
- 28 July – Nelson Mela
- 28 July – Local & International Bands at Manchester Hard Rock Cafe
- 29 July – Catch the Spirit of the Games at Bupa's Mind Body and Soul zone at Asda Eastlands
- 29 July – "Going for Gold: A Spiritual Approach to Achieving Goals" with Lesley Gort, Christian Science Reading Room
- 29 July – Commonwealth Games show, Frog & Bucket Comedy Club
- 29 July – 2 August – Commonwealth Cafe, King's House
- 30 July – Special Sportsmans Dinner Meeting with USA Boxer Earnie Shavers, Swinton Park Golf Club
- 31 July – "Games Structures", photographs by Stephen M Smith, Simple Cafe Bar

== August 2002 and later ==
- 1 August – Tony Kofi and his Afro-Jazz family, Band on the Wall
- 2 August – Nucleus Roots, Band on the Wall
- 2 August – Special Sportsmans Dinner Meeting, with footballer Martin Clarke, Swinton Park Golf Club
- 2 August – A Classical Evening in an Urban Park, Royal Liverpool Philharmonic Orchestra, Longford Park
- 3 August – "G Percussion", Commonwealth Games Percussion, Castlefield
- 3 August – City Centre Secrets, Victorian Society guided-walk around Manchester City Centre
- 3 August – More than Gold Final Festival, Salvation Army Hall Rochdale
- 3–5 August – Flower Festival, Horwich Moor Methodist Church
- 4 August – Hyndburn Mela
- 4 August – Preston Mela
- 4 August – Mujo, the Big Band Sound for the Big Games Finale, Manchester Hard Rock Cafe
- 11 August – Rock in the Park, Queen's Park Heywood
- 11 August – East Feast Festival – Fire & Water Festival, Ashton Canal, Philips Park
- 11 August – The Comedy Store's Post Commonwealth Cabaret
- 11 August – Commonwealth Black Pudding Throwing Championships, Ramsbottom
- 12 August – 26 November – "Spirit of the Games", Manchester Museum of Science and Industry
- 16–18 August – Bolton Show, Leverhulme Park, Bolton
- 26–30 August – Commonwealth Tenpin Bowling Championships, Stirling
- 9 October – 9 November – "Swim" – an exhibition about the Culture of Moving in Water – Lancaster City Museum
