= Hinduism in Ireland =

Hinduism in Ireland may refer to:

- Hinduism in the Republic of Ireland
- Hinduism in Northern Ireland
