= Hinduism in Wales =

Hindus in Wales
Year	Pop.	±%
2001	5,439	—
2011	10,434	+91.8%
2021	12,242	+17.3%
Religious Affiliation was not asked before 2001.

Hinduism is a minority religion in Wales constituting 0.4% of its population. Under half of Welsh Hindus settled there in the second half of the 20th century.

== History ==
Most Welsh Hindus are of Indian origin, or from neighbouring countries, such as Sri Lanka, Pakistan, Nepal and Bangladesh. Many of them came after Idi Amin's expulsion of Indians and other Asians from Uganda in the 1970s, and some also came from South Africa. There are also a few of Indonesian origin.

Many of these are from the Punjab. Common languages amongst them, other than English and Welsh, include Punjabi, Hindi, Urdu, Gujarati and Nepali.

The Hindu Cultural Association of Wales (HCA Wales), established in March 1991, is a Registered Charity with the Charity Commission for England and Wales. It is run by the Indian community in Wales and aims to serve the pan-Indian community as well as helping the integration of the Indian community into the wider community.

== Demographics ==
Year	Percent	Increase
2001	0.19%	-
2011	0.3%	+0.1%
2021	0.4%	+0.1%

According to the 2021 Census, there are 12,242 Hindus living in Wales. According to the 2011 census, there were 10,434 Hindus in Wales, which was almost double the number in the 2001 census.

As of 2013, about half of the Hindus in Wales live in Cardiff (4,736), followed by Swansea (780), Newport (685) and Wrexham (504).

== Temples and sites ==
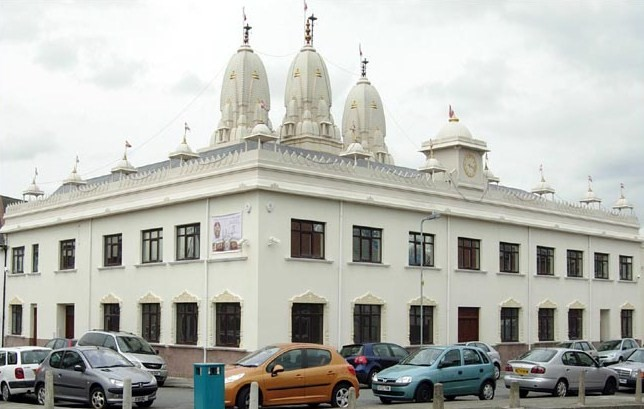
Shri Swaminarayan Mandir, Cardiff

Skanda Vale is an inter-faith ashram patronised by many Hindus, based in Llanpumsaint, Carmarthenshire. The site has three temples and attracts around 90,000 devotees annually.

The largest Hindu temple in Wales, the Shri Swaminarayan Mandir, is located in Grangetown, Cardiff. It is a Swaminarayan temple and was first opened in 1982.

The Sanatan Dharma Mandal Temple was originally established in 1985 in the Parade, Cardiff to serve Hindus in South Wales. Sanatan Dharma represents a code of conduct and a value system that has spiritual freedom as its core, serving all Hindus within Wales and aims to offer a place of no anxiety. The temple and Hindu Community Centre are today located in the Seaview, Lewis Road, Splott, Cardiff, CF24 5EB.

== Hindu Council of Wales ==
It is the major Hindu organisation in Wales. It was established in 2013, to promote Hindu culture, religion and values in Wales.

The council was made up of temples including Shri Swaminarayan Mandir in Cardiff and Sanatan Dharma Mandal temples, Hindu charities and community centres like the Bhaktidham Wales charity.

== See also ==
- Hinduism by country
- Hinduism in the United Kingdom
- Hinduism in England
- Hinduism in Scotland
- Hinduism in Ireland
  - Hinduism in Northern Ireland
  - Hinduism in the Republic of Ireland
- Encyclopedia of Hinduism
- Hindu eschatology
- Hindu Council UK
- Shambo
- Skanda Vale
