= Pledge of Allegiance (disambiguation) =

The Pledge of Allegiance of the United States is an expression of allegiance to the flag of the United States and the republic of the United States of America. The Pledge of Allegiance Building, or Youth's Companion Building, in Boston, Massachusetts, U.S. was where the pledge was written.

More broadly, a pledge of allegiance is any oral affirmation of one's dedication to a ruler, country, etc. (e.g., in the recent coronation, citizens were urged to pledge allegiance to the king).

Pledge of Allegiance may therefore also refer to other countries:

- Pledge of Allegiance (The Bahamas)
- Pledge of Allegiance (South Korea)
- Pledge of Allegiance to the Mexican Flag
- Pledge of Allegiance to the Philippine Flag

== Other ==
- "Pledge of Allegiance", an episode of NCIS (season 19)
- "Pledge of Allegiance" (song), by DJ Drama

== See also ==
- In God We Trust (disambiguation)
- One Nation Under God (disambiguation)
- Pledge of Allegiance Tour: Live Concert Recording, a live album by System of a Down, Slipknot, Mudvayne, American Head Charge and No One
- Oath of allegiance
