= South Asians in Ireland =

South Asian diaspora in Ireland

Total population
- 95,000; About 1.86% of the Irish population (2022 census).

Regions with significant populations
- Ballyhaunis, Galway, Dublin, Cork, Limerick, Athlone including respective suburban areas

Languages
- English, Irish, Hindi, Urdu, Telugu, Punjabi, Bengali, Gujarati, Other Indo-Aryan, Marathi, Malayalam, Tamil, Kannada, and Other Dravidian languages.

Religion
- Hinduism, Islam, Sikhism, Christianity, Zoroastrianism, Jainism, Buddhism others

Related ethnic groups
- British Asians

South Asians in Ireland are residents or citizens of Ireland who are of South Asian background or ancestry. There has been an important and well-established community of people of Indian descent in Ireland since the eighteenth century as a result of the British Raj.

There is great variation in how much the South Asian people are integrated into Irish society. Many people of South Asian descent are well-integrated and embrace the culture of Ireland. Many children of South Asian descent are born in Ireland or have come to Ireland at a very young age, and therefore learn the Irish language in schools (which is compulsory to children who have been living in the country before the age of 7). There are South Asian people who are up to 2nd and 3rd generation Irish-born. However, many South Asian people still maintain their ancestral customs and languages, and therefore many religious festivals (such as Diwali) are well-known and accepted within Ireland.

As the Irish government does not collect detailed data on ethnicity in Ireland, population estimates vary, and non-Chinese Asian people are generally grouped in one category rather than groups based on people from individual South Asian countries. Estimates say that people of South Asian ethnicity make up around 1 to 3% of Ireland's population. The Irish-India Council estimates that there are approximately 91,520 Indian-born people in Ireland while the Indian ministry of external affairs estimates about 61,386 non-resident Indians and people of Indian origin.

== Background ==
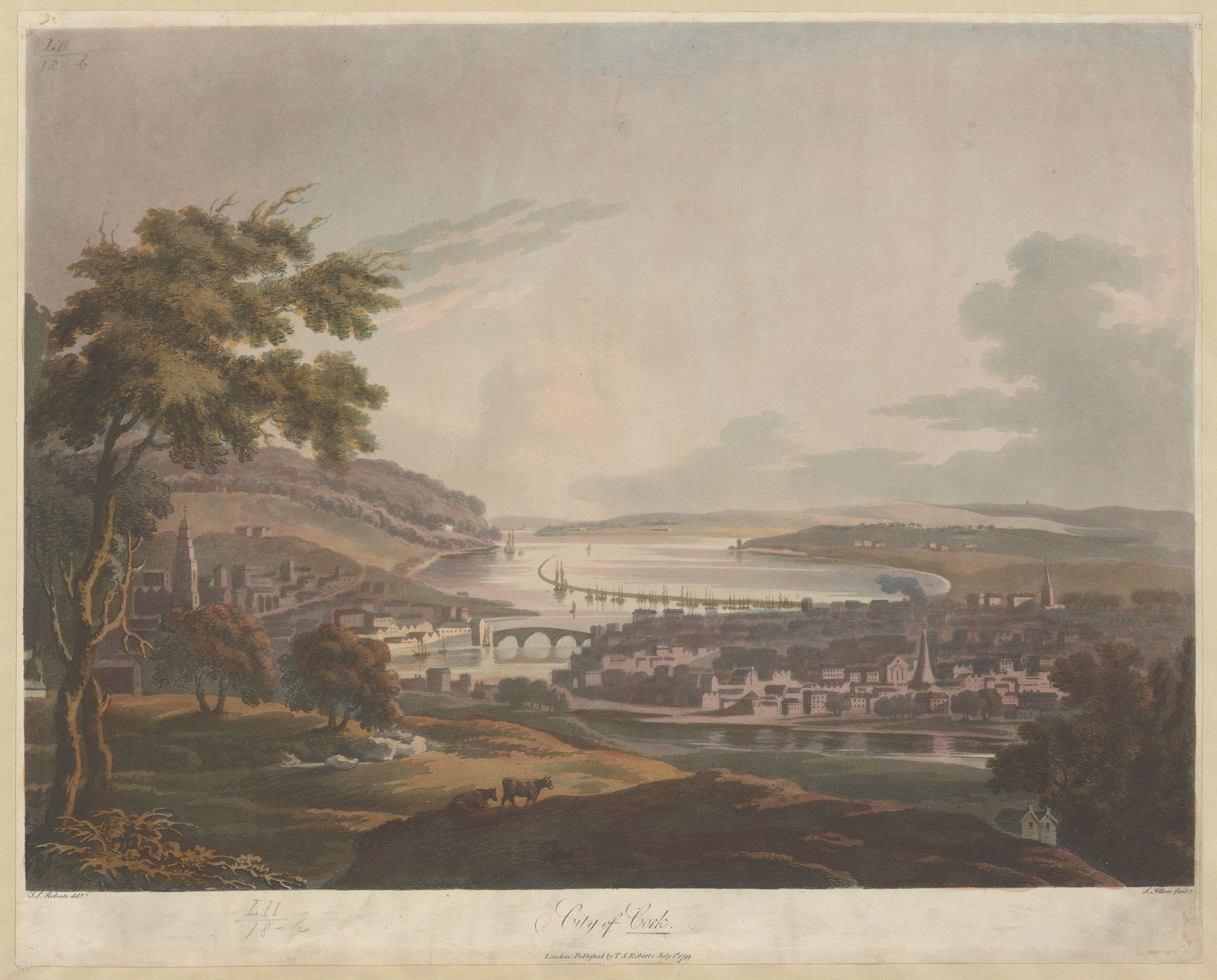
The port city of Cork where a number of South Asians settled from the eighteenth century onwards

Early South Asian presence in Ireland can be traced back to the role played by the East India Company in the eighteenth century. White Irish men working for the East India Company often returned to Ireland with domestic servants and lascars from India, many of whom found themselves in a state of vagrancy, particularly in port towns like Cork. On their return to Ireland, some Irish men working for the East India Company were also accompanied by their Indian wives, mistresses, and mixed race children. This may have been the case for Captain William Massey Baker, a Company officer and the brother of Godfrey Evans Baker who was the patron of Sake Dean Mahomed. Historian Michael H. Fisher speculates that Captain Baker may have been accompanied by his Indian mistress and their teenage Anglo-Indian daughter, Eleanor, on his return to Cork from India. Through the import of Indian domestic servants and lascars, and their relationships with their mistresses, wives, and children, Irish men working for the East India Company played an important role in creating a sizeable South Asian community in Ireland from the eighteenth century onwards.

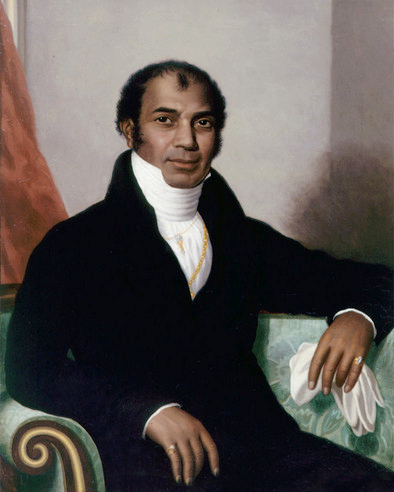
Sake Dean Mahomed, one of the most notable South Asian residents of Ireland

The late eighteenth century also saw the arrival of Dean Mahomed, an Indian entrepreneur and the most notable Indian resident of Ireland during the eighteenth century. Unlike the domestic servants and lascars imported as cheap labour from India, Mahomed was supported by Godfrey Evans Baker, an East Indian Company officer. Baker sponsored Mahomed's education in Cork where he met his wife Jane Daly, a Protestant woman from an Irish gentry family. Mahomed's connections with Baker allowed him to build his wealth in Cork, and his notable work The Travels of Dean Mahomet was published with the support of Ireland's wealthy elite. After two decades in Cork, Mahomed and his family emigrated to London in 1807.

South Asians continued to visit and settle in Ireland in the nineteenth century. One of the most prominent South Asians to arrive during this time was Mir Aulad Ali (1832–98), a Muslim Indian scholar who worked as Professor of Arabic, Hindustani, and Persian at Trinity College, Dublin. Beyond his academic engagements, Aulad Ali was an example of significant South Asian presence in Dublin's social circles, well-regarded and lauded for his charitable work in the parish of Rathmines. He frequently attended formal events in traditional Indian attire and was often one of the main local dignitaries present to greet and guide foreign parties upon their arrival to Dublin. In this respect, Aulad Ali represented a South Asian community that was not only accepted and welcomed in nineteenth century Ireland, but one that also directly contributed to the enhancement of social and political life. He also represented an increasing presence of mixed race families in Ireland during the nineteenth century, marrying an Englishwoman named Rebecca with whom he had a son, Arthur, who was baptised at the parish of Rathmines.

In the late 1980s and early 1990s, South Asian doctors began to settle in Ireland. Ireland has long had a shortage of doctors and nurses, partially due to the emigration of indigenous doctors, and therefore hires many foreign medical staff. Most of the foreign medical staff come from India and Pakistan. This is probably due to the large numbers of medical graduates in those countries who are attracted to Ireland by its use of the English language, living standards, salaries, opportunities and new lives in Europe and the Western world.

While South Asian doctors continue to come to Ireland, over the recent years (especially during the Celtic Tiger, a period of major economic boom in Ireland), a significant number of other non-medical South Asians have come to live in Ireland, seeking labour, opportunities, better standards of living and money to support their families at home. These people may be skilled, semi-skilled or unskilled and have varying knowledge of the English language. Thousands of South Asians work in construction, business, industry, pharmaceuticals, e-commerce, management and education in Ireland. There are hundreds of Indian restaurants and Kebab shops that are entirely South Asian-owned and run in nearly all of Ireland's major urban centres.

In recent years, there has been a growing interest within students from South Asian countries or South Asian background to undertake third level education in Ireland. Some of these students decide to stay on and work in Ireland after they graduate. Many of Ireland's major third level institutions, most notably Royal College of Surgeons in Ireland, Dublin City University, Dublin Institute of Technology, National University of Ireland, Galway and National College of Ireland have a substantial number of students of South Asian descent. The Irish government wants to double the number of overseas students in Irish universities by 2015, and has shortlisted India as one of the key areas for bringing in foreign students.

== Demographics ==
These figures are based on the 2011 census figures. As the Irish government does not take detailed statistics based on race and ethnicity, these figures may not be exactly accurate and should therefore only be taken as an indicator.

=== Population in major Irish cities and towns ===
City or town	County	Approximate Asian population
Dublin (and suburbs)	Dublin	33,225
Cork City and suburbs	Cork	3,240
Limerick City (and suburbs)	Limerick	1,734
Galway City (and suburbs)	Galway	1,590
Ballyhaunis	Mayo	478
Waterford City (and suburbs)	Waterford	846
Letterkenny	Donegal	600
Sligo (and suburbs)	Sligo	590
Athlone	Westmeath and Roscommon	525
Kilkenny City	Kilkenny	506

=== Religion ===
This table gives a brief indication of the religions followed by the people of South Asian descent in Ireland. These were the figures from the 2011 census. There are numerous Islamic centres and mosques and many Hindu temples in Ireland, although as with most Irish the most-confessed faith by South Asians is Catholicism.

Religion	Approximate Asian followers
Roman Catholic	24,250
Islam	19,451
Hinduism	8,279
Orthodox Christianity	1,660
Church of Ireland and Church of England	669
Other Christian religions	846
Sikhism	1,200
No religion	3,010
Atheist or Agnostic	52
Jainism	1,000

== Culture ==
South Asians are diverse in their cultures and speak different languages as well. Many South Asian people are well-integrated into Irish society and embrace the culture of Ireland. However, the presence of South Asian people in Ireland has noticeably affected many aspects of Irish life. Festivals such as Diwali and Eid al-Fitr are celebrated every year in Ireland by South Asian people and native Irish people alike. There are many different organisations in Ireland that promote South Asian events in Ireland.

Every year, there is a large Diwali celebration in Dublin, with fireworks demonstrations, performances from well-known Indian musicians, traditional dancing from different parts of India, art, children's activities and a wide range of Indian cuisine and merchandising stalls selling traditional jewellery, clothing, Henna, etc. The use of fireworks are generally restricted in Ireland, but the government makes an exception due to the importance of the festival to the Hindu people. There are also such gatherings during the festival of Holi. The Ireland India Council, a voluntary council made to serve the needs and business relations of the Indian people in Ireland, organises many events and gatherings on a regular basis.

Some South Asians have also been influenced by parts of Irish culture. For example, every year in Ireland many South Asian people participate in the annual St Patrick's Day parades throughout the country. The Sligo parade is one example that has regular participation from the local Riverstown Cricket Club, mainly represented by people of Pakistani origin. In Dublin, Indian people are known to have regular involvement. Also, there is a huge interest in Indian cuisine within Ireland. There are many Indian restaurants in Ireland, some are even being set up run by native Irish people.

South Asians have also influenced sport in Ireland. There are numerous cricket clubs throughout the country that are run by South Asians or have large South Asian involvement and participation. One example is Riverstown Cricket Club in Sligo. This club also promotes cultural events such as parties for Eid-ul-Fittr.

== Contemporary and social issues ==
After the September 11 attacks, there was an increase of attacks against Sikhs; in response many Irish Sikhs decided to remove their turbans and cut their hair as they were being mistaken for being Muslim.

The most prominent case is the death of Savita Halappanavar, a woman of Indian origin from Galway, who died aged 31 after being refused an abortion. She was reportedly refused an abortion because Ireland is "a Catholic country". This led to protests outside the Irish embassies in New Delhi, London, Berlin and Brussels, as well as protests from local communities in Ireland. The Indian Minister for External Affairs, Salman Khurshid, summoned the Indian ambassador to Ireland, Debashish Chakravarti, to India for deliberations over the issue.

== Notable Irish people of South Asian origin ==
- Leo Varadkar, former Taoiseach
- Cyrus Pallonji Mistry, businessman; former chairman of the Tata Group
- Moosajee Bhamjee, former TD for County Clare
- Shapoor Mistry, billionaire
- Zahan Mistry, billionaire
- Firoz Mistry, billionaire
- Noel Tata, chairman of Tata trust
- Trisha Kanyamarala, chess player
- Reita Faria, Miss World
- Cauvery Madhavan, writer

== See also ==
- British Indians
