= Just Before the Rain =

2002 play

Just Before the Rain was a play created in the aftermath of the 2001 Oldham race riots. Commissioned by Peshkar Productions, it was a devised piece involving local performers directed by Iain Bloomfield.

== Tour ==
The play was initially created for the Cultureshock at the 2002 Commonwealth Games, and had a sole performance at the Contact Theatre in 2002. In 2003, the play was toured to the following venues:

- Contact Theatre, 13–15 February
- Octagon Theatre, Bolton, 17–19 February
- Darwen Library Theatre, 20 February
- King George's Hall, Blackburn, 23 February
- Theatre in the Mill, Bradford, 4–5 March
- Gateway Theatre, Chester, 18–21 March
- Live Theatre Company, 3–5 April
- Sherman Cymru, 8–9 April
- Lawrence Batley Theatre, 22–23 May
- Watermans Arts Centre, 8–10 May
- Oldham Coliseum Theatre, 13 May
- Phoenix Arts Centre, 16–17 May

== Original cast ==
Jaheda Choudury, Anjub Ali, Aklakur Rahman, Mahmood Ali and Shahena Choudhury.
