= Hinduism in Northern Ireland =

Hinduism is one of the fastest growing religions in Northern Ireland with over 4,000 Hindus in the country, making up 0.22% of the population. There are currently 3 Mandirs in Belfast alone: Radha-Krishna Temple in Malone Road, Laxmi-Narayan Mandir in Clifton Street and Radha Madhava Mandir (ISKCON) in Upper Dunmurry Lane. There is also a Hare Krishna Centre on Inish Rath Island that was established in 1985.

== Demographics ==
Historical Population of Hindus
| Year | Pop. | ±% |
|---|---|---|
| 2001 | 825 | — |
| 2011 | 2,382 | +188.7% |
| 2021 | 4,190 | +75.9% |
Census data on the number of Hindus in Northern Ireland began in 2001.

Hindus in Northern Ireland
| Year | Percent | Increase |
|---|---|---|
| 2001 | 0.05% | - |
| 2011 | 0.13% | +0.08% |
| 2021 | 0.22% | +0.09% |

== Hindu temples ==
List of Hindu temples in Northern Ireland

=== Belfast ===
- Laxmi-Narayan Mandir, Clifton Street, Carlisle Circus, Belfast
- Radha-Krishna Temple, 9 Malone Road, Belfast BT9 6RY
- Sri Sri Radha – Madhava Belfast Temple (ISKCON), 140 Upper Dunmurry Lane, Brooklands Grange, Belfast BT17 OHE

=== Fermanagh ===
Temples in Fermanagh:

- Sri Sri Radha Govinda Govindadwipa Temple Inis Rath Island (ISKCON), Lake Island of Inis Rath, Lisnaskea, BT92 2GN

== See also ==
- Hinduism in the Republic of Ireland
- Hinduism in the United Kingdom
  - Hinduism in England
  - Hinduism in Scotland
  - Hinduism in Wales
- Hindu Council UK
- Sanskrit in the West
- Religion in Northern Ireland
