= Pledge =

Pledge may refer to:

== Promises ==
- a solemn promise
- Abstinence pledge, a commitment to practice abstinence, usually teetotalism or chastity
- The Pledge (New Hampshire), a promise about taxes by New Hampshire politicians
- Pledge of Allegiance (disambiguation), several uses

== Arts and entertainment ==
=== Music ===
- Pledge (album), by Killer Mike, 2011
- Pledge: A Tribute to Kerbdog, a 2010 album by Kerbdog
- "Pledge" (song), by The Gazette, 2010
- "Pledge", a prelude to Janet Jackson's 1989 song "Rhythm Nation"
- "The Pledge (Remix)", a song on the 2002 album The Last Temptation by Ja Rule
- Die Bürgschaft ('The Pledge'), a 1799 ballad by Friedrich Schiller
- Die Bürgschaft (opera), by Kurt Weill, 1932

=== Other uses in arts and entertainment ===
- The Pledge (play), an 1831 play by James Kenney
- The Pledge: Requiem for the Detective Novel, a 1958 novella by Friedrich Dürrenmatt
- The Pledge (film), a 2001 American mystery directed by Sean Penn
- The Pledge, the title of the DVD release of A Gunfighter's Pledge, a 2008 TV Western
- The Pledge (British TV programme), 2016-2020
- Pledge (film), a 2018 American horror film

== Ships ==
- USS Pledge (AM-277), a minesweeper commissioned in 1944
- USS Pledge (MSO-492), a minesweeper commissioned in 1956

== Other uses ==
- Pledge (brand), a cleaning product by S. C. Johnson & Son
- Pledge (law), a type of legal relationship
- a prospective member of a fraternity or sorority
- H.S. Pledge & Sons Ltd, a milling business
- Thomas Frederick de Pledge (1867–1954), Australian pioneer and pastoralist
- Pledge, a maze-solving algorithm
- pledge, a system call which is one of the OpenBSD security features of that computer operating system
