= Poppy Jhakra =

English actress (born 1984)

Poppy Jhakra (born 1984) is an English actress from West Yorkshire. She is best known for her roles in Waterloo Road and Coronation Street.

Jhakra has appeared in Holby City, Waking the Dead and Doctors. She graduated from Rose Bruford College with a First Class degree in American Theatre Arts in 2005, spending a year on American conventions and techniques in Texas.

Jhakra has also appeared in Peter Kosminskys two part Channel 4 docu-film Britz. Following this she landed the part of the rebellious teenager Minnie Chandra in Coronation Street, who she played for eighteen months. She initially auditioned for a different part, but impressed producers so much so in her meeting that the role of Minnie was written in for her.

Jhakra was also cast in Scallywagger and Inn Mates starring Neil Morrissey, comedy sketch shows for the BBC playing various characters.

In July 2010, Jhakra was cast as new ambitious English teacher Eleanor Chaudry in the BBC One school-based drama series, Waterloo Road.

Jhakra has also given a one-woman show called Dance Without Movement in which she took her audiences through a journey of a young Asian woman's life in England as well as performing as Princess Jasmine in Aladdin at the Theatre Royal, Windsor for Bill Kenwright during Christmas 2009.

In August 2016, Jhakra appeared as "tricky" agency nurse Amira Zafar in a feature-length special episode of Casualty, broadcast on 27 August 2016. Jhakra revealed on 5 October 2016 that Amira would appear in one further episode of the show, which she filmed between 5 October and 7 October. Jhakra later appeared in episodes of Holby City in 2017, and 2019 as agency nurse Amira Zafar.

== Filmography ==
=== Film ===
Year	Film	Role	Notes
2010	Inn Mates	Sharon	Television film
2011	Bride and Gloom	Simran	Short film
2014	Stains of Staines	Jaz	Television film
2017	Apostasy	Doctor	

=== Television ===
Year	Title	Role	Notes
2005	Holby City	Nadine Wallace	Episode: "Family Planning"
2005	Waking the Dead	Samantha Taylor	Episode: "Undertow: Part 1"
2006	Doctors	Meena Shah	Episode: "School's Out"
2008–2009	Coronation Street	Minnie Chandra	Series regular; 35 episodes
2011	Waterloo Road	Eleanor Chaudry	Series regular; 10 episodes
2013	Holby City	Zina Ahmed	Episode: "Point of Impact"
2016	Hank Zipzer	Miss Goodison	Episode: "Teacher Torture"
2016–2017	Casualty	Amira Zafar	Recurring role; 2 episodes
2017	The Dumping Ground	Diane	Episode: "The Switch"
2017–2019	Holby City	Amira Zafar	Recurring role; 5 episodes
2022	Red Rose	Mrs. Mahajan	Recurring role; 4 episodes
2023	The Bay	Fatima Amin	Recurring role; 2 episodes
