= Dance Without Movement =

Dance Without Movement is a dark and comic play by Sophia Rashid. Commissioned by Peshkar Productions, a group that aims to experiment with young British Asian theatre, it is a one-woman piece focused on Zuleikha, a British Asian woman of Pakistani descent who is in the midst of a cultural divide Directed by Jim Johnson (theatre-maker/musician), the play went through two tours: a 2007 one that was local to Oldham and saw Zuleikha played by Poppy Jhakra Poppy Jhakra, actor, Mandy Actors and a residency at the 2008 Edinburgh Festival Fringe which saw Yamina Peerzada take on the role.

== Synopsis ==
Dance without movement is a one-woman play where Zuleikha explores her identity. She has reached adulthood and has been a part of many communities up until now. Her Pakistani background and Muslim faith are at odds with her English upbringing. Amidst a sea of confusion Zuleikha must try to unravel her true identity.

== Sources ==
- Sophia on the Fringe of success - News - News and Reviews - Greater Manchester's CityLife
- Dance without Movement - Review - Edinburgh Festival guide | Fest
