= Hinduism in the United Kingdom =

Hindus in the United Kingdom

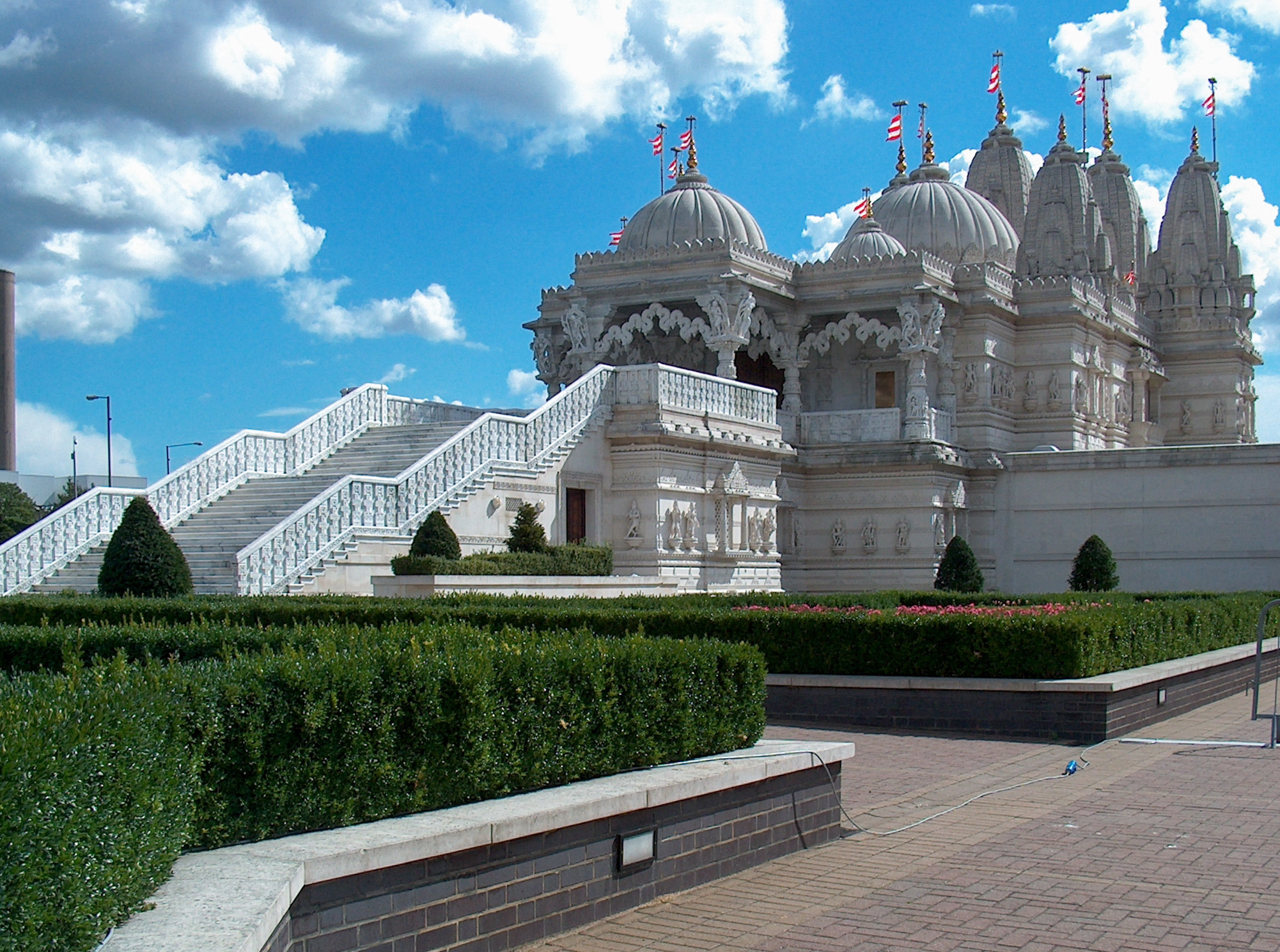
- Neasden Temple in London.

Total population
- United Kingdom: 1,066,894 – 1.6% (2021); England: 1,020,533 – 1.8% (2021); Scotland: 29,929 – 0.6% (2022); Wales: 12,242 – 0.4% (2021); Northern Ireland: 4,190 – 0.2% (2021)

Regions with significant populations
- Greater London: 453,034 – 5.1%
- South East England: 154,748 – 1.7%
- East Midlands: 120,345 – 2.5%
- West Midlands: 88,116 – 1.5%

Religions
- Majority: Vaishnavism; Minority: Shaivism

Languages
- Sacred: Sanskrit and Old Tamil; Majority: Asian languages and English; Minority: Other languages spoken by the Hindu diaspora

Related ethnic groups
- British Sikhs and British Buddhists

Hinduism is the third-largest religious group in the United Kingdom, after Christianity and Islam. It is followed by just over one million people (around 1.7% of the total population). According to the 2021 United Kingdom census Hindus are primarily concentrated in England, particularly in Greater London and the South East, with just under 50,000 Hindus residing in the three other nations of the United Kingdom. Hindus have had a presence in the United Kingdom since the early 19th century, as at the time India was part of the British Empire. Many Indians in the British Indian Army settled in the United Kingdom of Great Britain and Northern Ireland. Later, more Hindus arrived in the UK, including students who came to study at British universities. Madan Lal Dhingra was one of the nationalists who fought for Indian Human Rights in early twentieth century from the UK.

Most British Hindus were immigrants, mainly from India, and there are also significant number of Hindu immigrants from Sri Lanka and Nepal, with even smaller numbers from Afghanistan, Bangladesh, and Bhutan. In recent decades, due to the efforts of ISKCON, BAPS and other Hindu organisations and increased interest in Yoga, Meditation and other practises associated with Hindu traditions, many British citizens from other ethnic backgrounds have embraced Hinduism too, including many celebrities. The UK has the largest Hindu population in Europe.

== History ==
The British Hindu population includes those who came directly from the Indian subcontinent, descendants of those Hindus who had originally migrated to other countries but later resettled in the United Kingdom, and those born and raised in the UK. It is not unusual to find third or fourth generation Hindus.

There have been three main waves of migration of Hindus in the UK, and most of the Hindu migration has occurred after World War II. The first wave was at the time of British India's independence and partition in 1947. Also, in the early 1960s the Conservative health minister Enoch Powell recruited a large number of doctors from the Indian subcontinent. The second wave occurred in the 1970s mainly from East Africa especially due to the expulsion of Asians from Uganda. Later, communities included those from Guyana, Trinidad and Tobago, Mauritius and Fiji. The last wave of migration began in the 1990s and is a result of the United Kingdom's immigration policy, which made studying and immigration to the UK easier. This wave also included Tamil refugees from Sri Lanka and professionals including doctors and software engineers from India.

== Life and culture ==
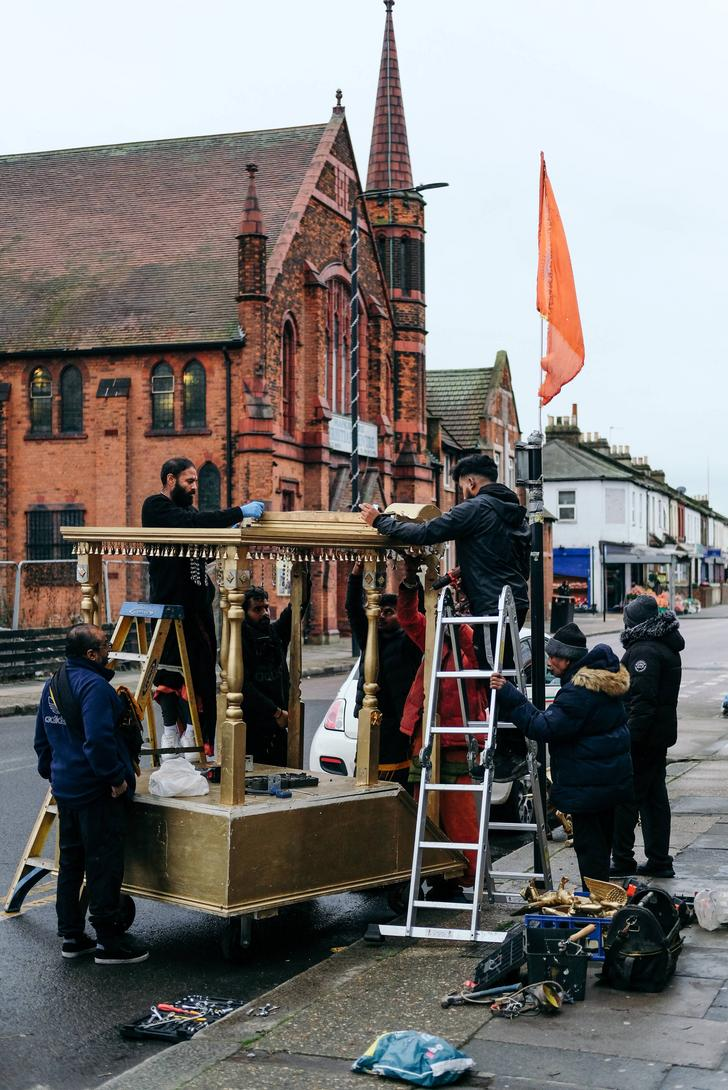
Construction of a golden Chariot in Manor Park, London, as part of a celebration at the Swami Ayyappan Temple.

=== Community and social life ===
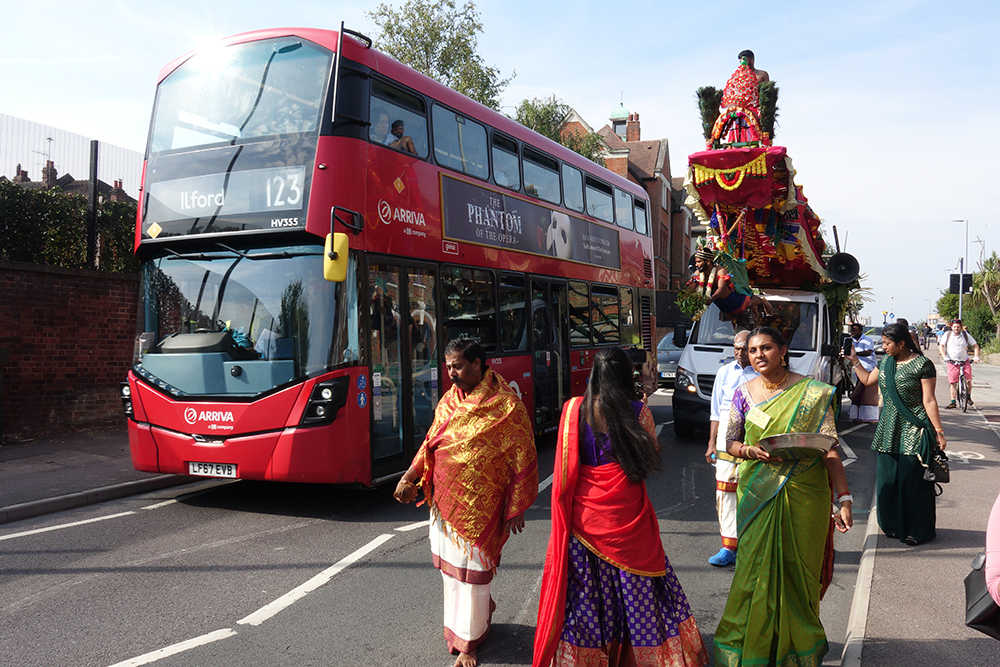
A classic red London bus passes by a Hindu Rathayatra Procession in London, UK

According to United Kingdom's Office of National Statistics, of all ethnic minorities in Britain, the British Hindus had the highest rate of economic activity in 2011 and 2018, and a median net wealth of £206,000 in 2006 (compared to median net wealth of £223,000 for British Christians). In addition to this, according to survey conducted by Trust for London in 2012, Hindus living in London have the second highest median net wealth of £277,400 following British Jews, with the highest median wealth of £312,500. Hindu men are more likely than the general population to be entrepreneurs, and both Hindu men and women are more likely than the general population to have higher education. Over a 20-year period, British Hindus also had the third-lowest poverty level (after British Christian and British Jews), and the second-lowest rates of arrest, trial or imprisonment at 0.5% (after British Jews' 0.3%) among all ethnic groups tracked by UK's Ministry of Justice. Hindus constitute less than 0.5% of the total prison population in Britain (compared to 48% for Christians and 15% for Muslims). According to Office for National Statistics, British Hindus also have the second highest employment rate of 76% amongst all religious groups in UK followed by people with no religious affiliation at 77%. Employees who identified as Hindu have consistently had the second-highest median hourly earnings; in 2018, this was £13.80. 4 in 10 of those who identified as Hindu were occupied in high-skill occupations which was second in the country following British Jews. British who identified as Hindus have the highest percentage with a degree or equivalent qualification.

=== Temples and organisations ===
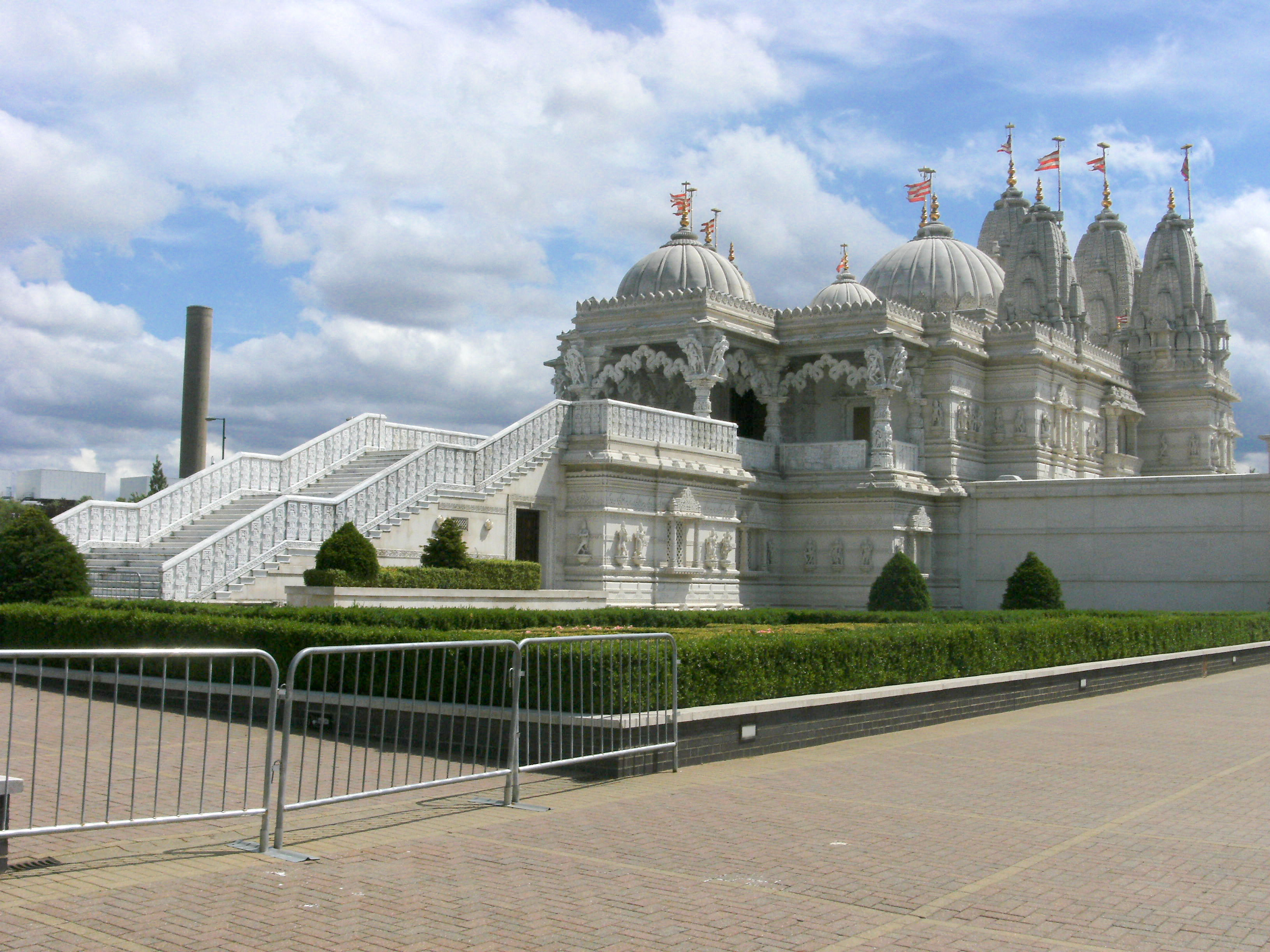
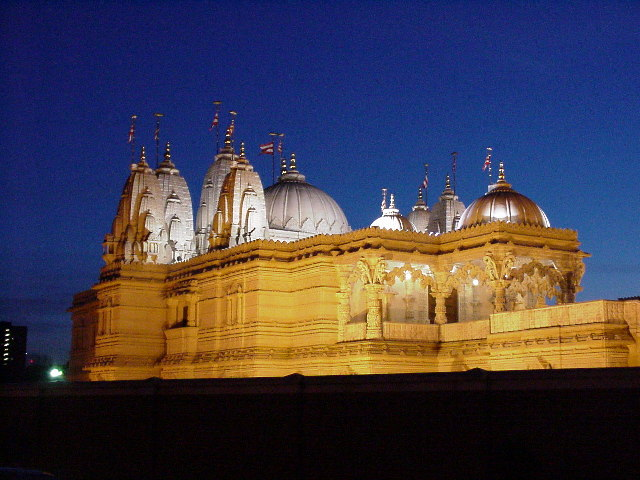
BAPS Shri Swaminarayan Mandir London is the largest Hindu temple of England, in northwest London.

A University of Derby report states that there are considerable linguistic and theosophical diversities among Hindus in the United Kingdom, yet they also share certain core beliefs, rites and festivals of Hinduism.

UK-wide Hindu organisations include the National Council of Hindu Temples, the Hindu Council UK and the Hindu Forum of Britain—national umbrella organisations for Hindus in the UK. The National Council of Hindu Temples UK which is the oldest UK-wide Hindu organisation. It comprises over 300 Hindu temples (mandirs (IAST: maṇḍira; Sanskrit: मण्डिर)) and Hindu faith organisations. The Hindu Council UK representing almost 400 affiliated cultural and religious organisations of various Hindu denominations including temples, and the Hindu Forum of Britain, with nearly 300 member organisations.

The Bharat Hindu Samaj Mandir in Peterborough which has operated from New England Complex since 1986 has served over 13,000 Hindus across Cambridgeshire, Norfolk, and Lincolnshire. In 2026, the city council approved selling the temple to the Khadijah Mosque, part of the United Kingdom Islamic Mission for redevelopment into a mosque, this decision was criticised by temple's trustees and the Hindu Council UK as unlawful and religiously insensitive.

There are regional organisations that organise community events and social affairs in the UK, such as The Hindu Council of Birmingham.

There were over 150 Hindu temples in the UK in 2012 with 30 temples in the London area alone. Slough Hindu Temple was built by the Slough Hindu Cultural Society - formally opened in 1981 - it was the first purpose-built Hindu Temple in the British Isles. However, the first Hindu Temple in the UK was opened in the late-1920s near Earls Court in London and it was functional for about four years. In 2020, Historic England (HE) published A Survey of Hindu Buildings in England with the aim of providing information about buildings that Hindus use in England so that HE can work with communities to enhance and protect those buildings now and in the future. The scoping survey identified 187 Hindu temples in England.

There is a diversity of Hindu-based organisations in the UK including the International Society for Krishna Consciousness (ISKCON), Bochasanwasi Akshar Purushottam Swaminarayan Sanstha (BAPS) in Neasden (Greater London), the Chinmaya Mission, Ramakrishna Mission and Sai Organisation, each having large followings. SHYAM, an educational Hindu organisation teaches the Bhagavad Gita, Ramayana, Shrimad Bhagavad, Vedas and Upanishads. The predominant Hindu beliefs found in the UK include its Vedanta monist, Vedanta monotheistic and various sampradayas (IAST: sampradāya-s; Sanskrit: सम्प्रदाय; lit. ‘traditions’ or ‘lineages’). Less of 1% of the Hindus in the UK identify themselves to be belonging to Divine Life Society, Hare Krishna and other organizations.

=== Festivals and community events ===
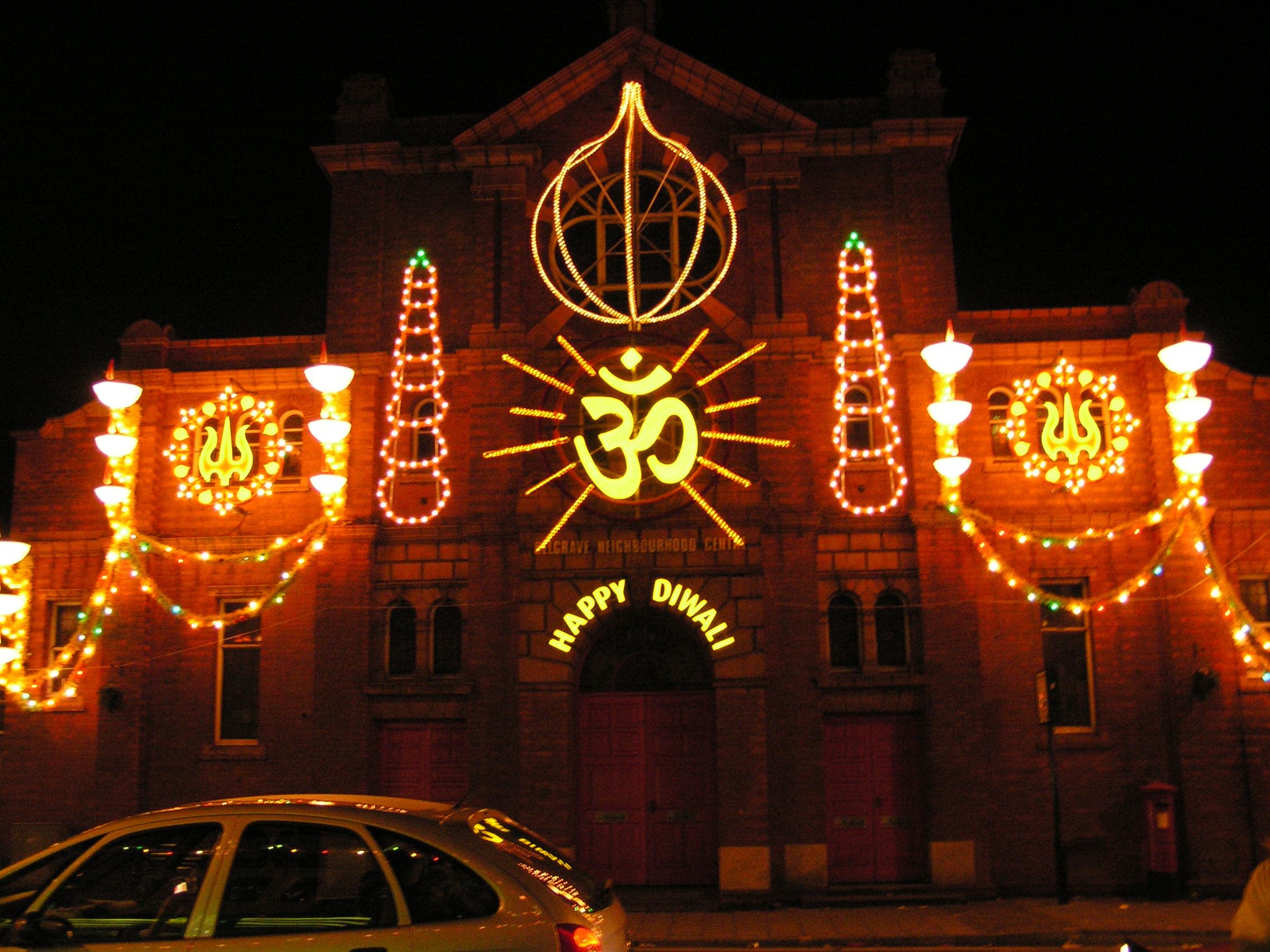
Diwali decorations in Leicester, United Kingdom.

Hindus in the United Kingdom celebrate major festivals such as Diwali. Homes and businesses are decorated with festive lights and Hindus gift sweets such as laddoo and barfi. Community events such as dances and parties bring Hindus and non-Hindus together. Leicester annually plays hosts to one of the biggest Diwali celebrations outside of India.

The Hindu festival of Diwali has begun to find acceptance into the larger British community. King Charles has attended Diwali celebrations at some of UK’s prominent Hindu temples, such as the Swaminarayan Temple in Neasden. Since 2009, Diwali has been celebrated every year at 10 Downing Street, the residence of the UK Prime Minister.

=== Hindu Council UK ===
The Hindu Council UK is an umbrella organisation for Hindus living in the United Kingdom, and is one of several groups representing Hindus that are influential at the national level. It was set up in 1994. According to the Council's then-General Secretary, it faced opposition from the Sangh Parivar when it was founded. It collaborated with the Department for Communities and Local Government to explore how caste influenced public life in the UK. A debate on religious conversion hosted on its website reflected a Hindu nationalist perspective, and included contributors from the Vishva Hindu Parishad.

== Demographics ==
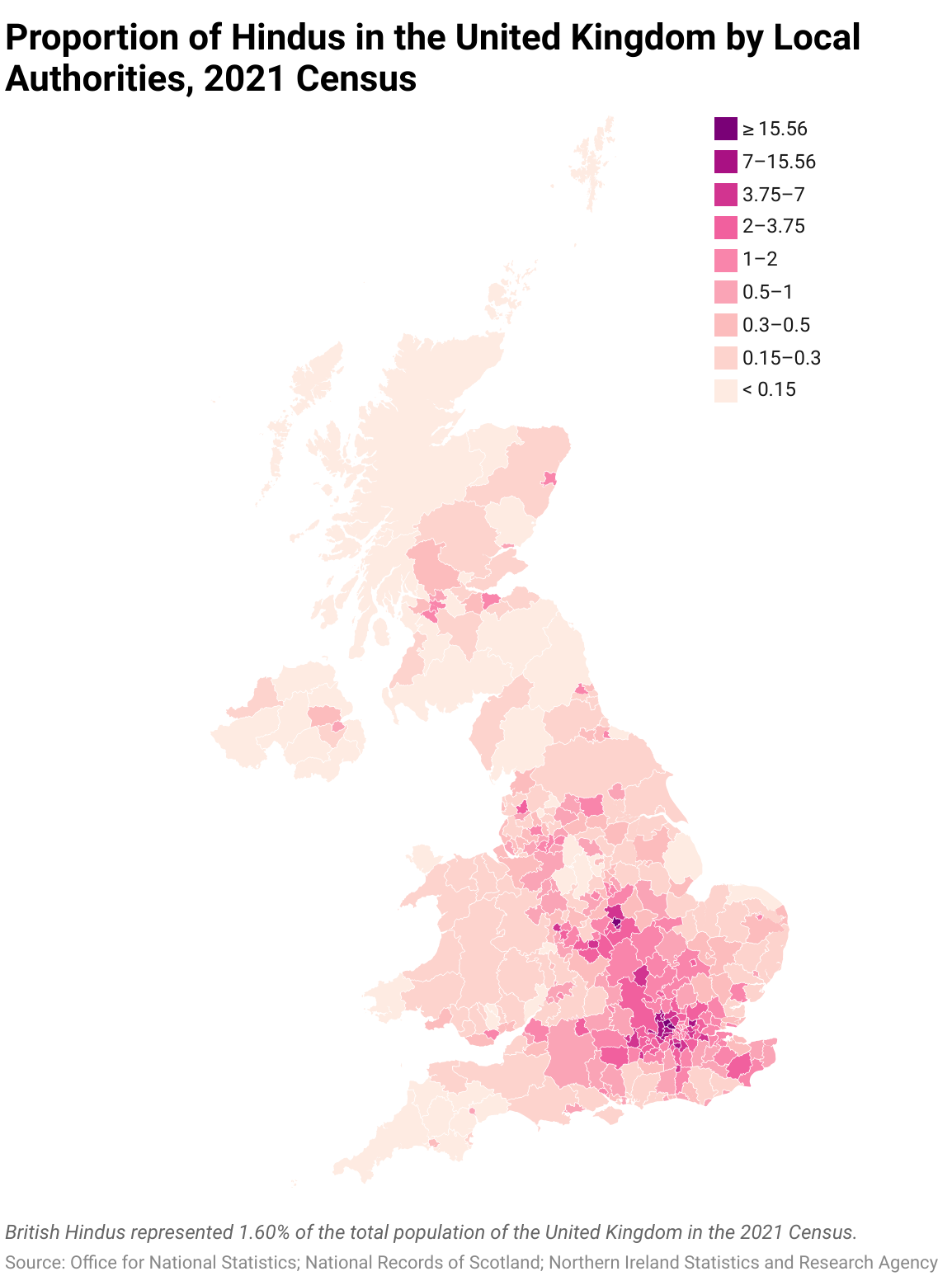
Distribution of British Hindus by local authority, 2021 census

Hindus in the United Kingdom by region and country
| Region / Country | 2021 (Note: 2021/22: England and Wales, Northern Ireland, and Scotland) | | 2011 (Note: 2011: England and Wales, Northern Ireland, and Scotland) | | 2001 (Note: 2001: England and Wales, Northern Ireland and Scotland) | |
| Region / Country | Number | % | Number | % | Number | % |
|---|---|---|---|---|---|---|
| England | 1,020,533 | 1.8% | 806,199 | 1.5% | 546,982 | 1.1% |
| —Greater London | 453,034 | 5.1% | 411,291 | 5.0% | 291,977 | 4.1% |
| —South East | 154,748 | 1.7% | 92,499 | 1.1% | 44,575 | 0.6% |
| —East Midlands | 120,345 | 2.5% | 89,723 | 2.0% | 66,710 | 1.6% |
| —West Midlands | 88,116 | 1.5% | 72,247 | 1.3% | 56,668 | 1.1% |
| —East | 86,631 | 1.4% | 54,010 | 0.9% | 31,386 | 0.6% |
| —North West | 49,749 | 0.7% | 38,259 | 0.5% | 27,211 | 0.4% |
| —Yorkshire and the Humber | 29,243 | 0.5% | 24,074 | 0.5% | 15,797 | 0.3% |
| —South West | 27,746 | 0.5% | 16,324 | 0.3% | 8,288 | 0.2% |
| —North East | 10,924 | 0.4% | 7,772 | 0.3% | 4,370 | 0.2% |
| Scotland (Note: Scotland held its census a year later after the rest of the United Kingdom due to the COVID-19 pandemic. As a result, data shown is for 2022 as opposed to 2021.) | 29,929 | 0.6% | 16,379 | 0.3% | 5,564 | 0.1% |
| Wales | 12,242 | 0.4% | 10,434 | 0.3% | 5,439 | 0.2% |
| Northern Ireland | 4,190 | 0.2% | 2,382 | 0.1% | 825 | 0.05% |
| United Kingdom | 1,066,894 | 1.6% | 835,394 | 1.3% | 558,810 | 1.0% |

=== Population ===
Historical Population
| Year | Pop. | ±% |
|---|---|---|
| 1961 | 30,000 | — |
| 1971 | 138,000 | +360.0% |
| 1981 | 278,000 | +101.4% |
| 1991 | 397,000 | +42.8% |
| 2001 | 558,810 | +40.8% |
| 2011 | 835,394 | +49.5% |
| 2021 | 1,066,894 | +27.7% |
Religious Affiliation was not recorded in the census prior to 2001.

According to the 2021 Census, Hindus in England and Wales enumerated 1,032,775, or 1.7% of the population. Northern Ireland recorded a population of 4,190, or 0.2% of the population. The equivalent census was recorded a year later in Scotland with a population of 29,929, making up 0.6% of the population. The local authorities with the highest number of Hindus were: Harrow (67,392: 25.8% of the population), Leicester (65,821: 17.9%), Brent (52,876: 15.6%), Redbridge (34,372: 11.1%) and Hillingdon (33,020: 10.8%).

In the 2011 census, Hinduism was followed by 1.5% of the population of England, 0.34% in Wales and 0.31% in Scotland. Nearly half of the 817,000 Hindus living in England and Wales were residents of the London metropolitan area. About 300,000 British Hindus of all ages were born in the UK.

The Hindu population in the UK is predominantly urban, and has relatively higher representation in the professional and managerial positions.

=== Ethnicity ===
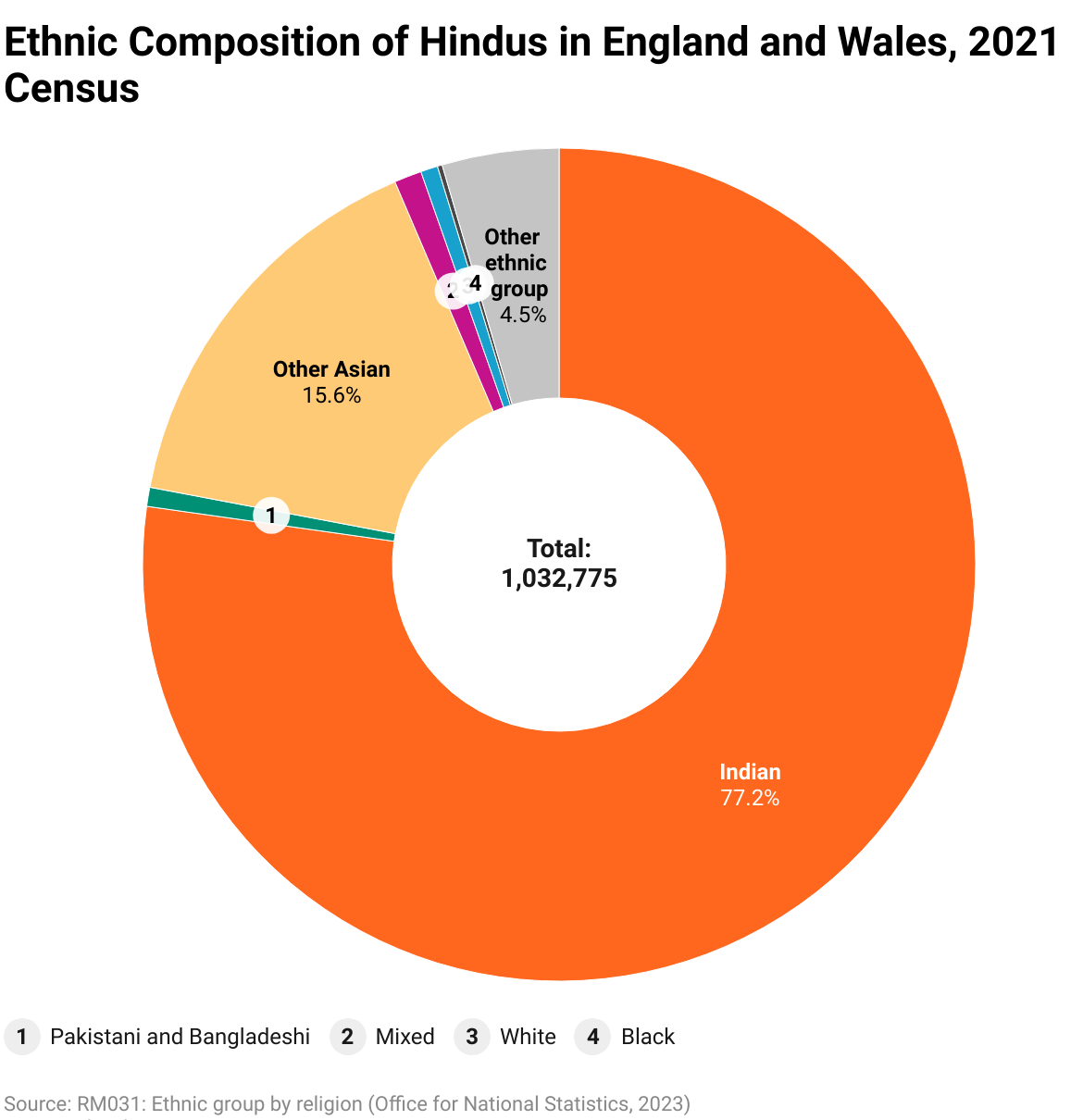
Ethnic composition of British Hindus, 2021 census

In the 2021 census for England and Wales, 77.2% of Hindus identified as Indian, 0.7% as either Pakistani or Bangladeshi, 15.6% were of other Asian heritage, 1.1% were of Mixed heritage, 0.7% as White, 0.2% identified as Black and the remaining 4.5% identified with other ethnic groups. The main places of birth were in South Asia at 528,096 (51.1% of the total Hindu population), the United Kingdom at 360,772 people (34.9%), South and Eastern Africa at 106,361 (10.3%), other parts of Europe at 14,300 (1.4%) and East and Southeast Asia at 9,767 (0.9%). Among individual countries outside of the UK, the countries of: India, Sri Lanka, Kenya, Nepal, Uganda, Mauritius and Tanzania made up the most common countries of birth for Hindus residing in England and Wales.

According to census records from 2011, 95.6% of the Hindus in England and Wales are ethnically Asian, with the 4.4% of the remainder being as follows: White 1.47%, Mixed 1.19%, Black 0.67% and other ethnicities 1% (including 0.13% Arab).

A very large proportion of Hindus in the United Kingdom are ethnically Asian, mainly Indians whose ancestors immigrated to the UK for employment

=== Converts ===
Famous converts to Hinduism include:

- Lead Guitarist of the Beatles, George Harrison converted to Hinduism in the mid 1960s. Upon his death in 2001, he was cremated per Hindu rituals and his ashes consecrated into river Ganges.
- Philosopher John Levy also converted to Hinduism.
- Novelist Christopher Isherwood, converted to Hinduism and remained a Hindu until his death.
- Hindu scholar Krishna Dharma (formerly Kenneth Anderson), converted to Hinduism in 1979.
- In September 2006, Rev. David Ananda Hart made headlines when he converted to Hinduism whilst still remaining a priest of the Church of England.

== Society ==
=== Politics ===
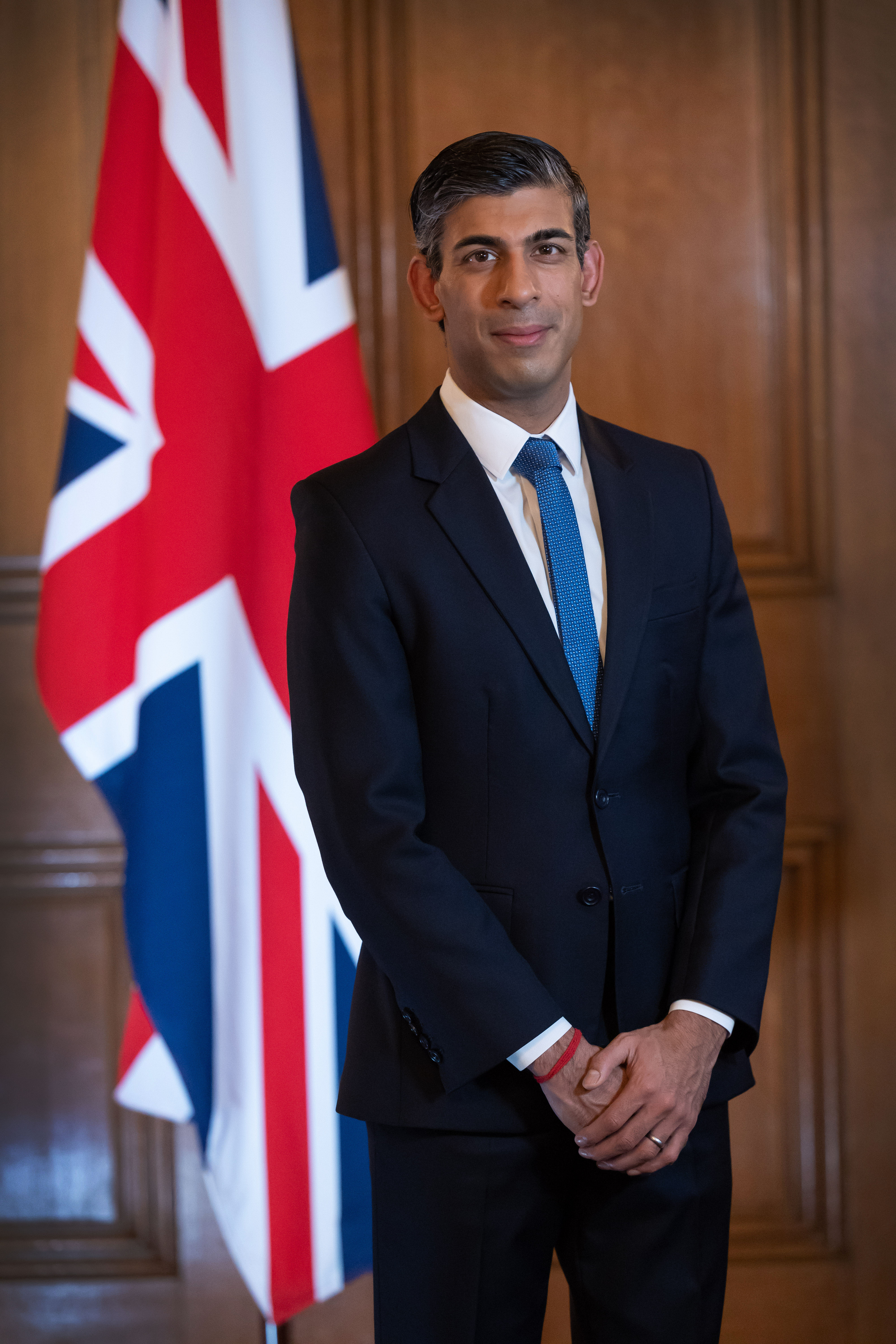
British Hindu Rishi Sunak became Prime Minister of the United Kingdom in 2022

In the 2017 general election, eight Hindu MPs (five Conservative and three Labour) were elected to Parliament.

During the 2019 general election, The Times of India reported that supporters of Narendra Modi's ruling Bharatiya Janata Party (BJP) were actively campaigning for the Tories in 48 marginal seats, and the Today programme reported that it had seen WhatsApp messages sent to Hindus across the country urging them to vote Conservative. Some British Indians spoke out against what they saw as the BJP's meddling in the UK election. The Hindu Council UK has been strongly critical of Labour, going as far as to say that Labour is "anti-Hindu" and objected to the party's condemnation of the Indian government's actions in the disputed territory of Kashmir.

In 2022, Rishi Sunak became the first practicing Hindu British Prime Minister, as well as the first non-White Prime Minister of the United Kingdom.

=== Economics ===
Hindus are more economically active than people of any other major religions. 70% of Hindus are active economically active, falling just behind people stating to have "No religion".The 2021 census for England and Wales recorded 66.9% of Hindus either owning their home with a mortgage (43.6%) or outright (23.3%). 27.6% rent privately or live rent free and the remaining 5.5% live in social housing.

Hindus are on average the second wealthiest religious group after Jewish people in the UK. Employees who identified as Hindu have consistently had the second-highest median hourly earnings; in 2018, this was £13.80.

== Discrimination and stereotyping ==
A report authored by Robert Berkeley of Runnymede Trust states that the Hindu community groups and organisations in the United Kingdom face systematic disadvantage and discrimination. They face a legacy of inequality, targeting and stereotyping in daily life and by the media, which has left the Hindu community isolated, with a limited capacity to engage with other communities, or address the problems they face.

Scholars state that the Hindu community in the United Kingdom, and Europe in general, has faced discrimination in immigration policies adopted by the local governments. In local councils, construction or expansion permits for Hindu temples and community centres have been turned down for years, while Muslim mosques and Christian churches have been approved by the same councils and built. The discrimination suffered by Hindu communities from the local council officials in Britain has been described by Paul Weller as follows,

Neighbourhood traffic and parking issues continued to be reported as a problem. For example, a leader of the Hindu community told us that his temple was not given permission or space for worshippers to park outside the temple during festivals – which occurred only a few times a year. By contrast, he drew attention to parking restrictions have been lifted every Friday for the local mosque and identified this as unfair. A Hindu woman in another field research location, described problems with securing planning permission to build an extension and car park for her local temple. She contrasted this with the experience of Muslims who, according to her, had been allowed to build a mosque on "each and every road".

Nearly 50% of Hindu children, both boys and girls, in British schools have reported to being victims of bullying for being Hindu and their religious heritage. However, Claire Monks et al. note that children of various races and religions report being victims of bullying in British schools as well.

The Hindu community in the United Kingdom is not unique in suffering discrimination and stereotyping. The similarly small Jewish community of the United Kingdom, and in recent years the much larger Muslim community of the United Kingdom, has also expressed similar concerns. New legislation and institutions to understand and respond to religious discrimination are being debated by British politicians.

Private golfing, country clubs and other social clubs in Britain have routinely discriminated against and denied entry to Hindus – in addition to Sikhs, Muslims, women, Africans and other minorities after asserting "freedom of association" principle, and parts of EU-wide law to limit this practice were adopted in the United Kingdom in 1998. In some instances of Islamist terrorism, such as after the 7 July 2005 London bombings, Hindus along with Sikhs of the United Kingdom became more targeted and vulnerable for backlash than Muslims.

In October 2018, it was reported that Conservative Party (UK) London mayoral candidate Shaun Bailey had written a pamphlet, entitled No Man’s Land, for the Centre for Policy Studies. In it, Bailey argued that accommodating Hindus "[robs] Britain of its community" and is turning the country into a "crime riddled cess pool". He also claimed that South Asians "bring their culture, their country and any problems they might have, with them" and that this was not a problem within the black community "because we’ve shared a religion and in many cases a language". In the pamphlet, Bailey had confused the Hindu religion and the Hindi language: "You don’t know what to do. You bring your children to school and they learn far more about Diwali than Christmas. I speak to the people who are from Brent and they’ve been having Hindi (sic) days off." The Conservative Party Deputy Chairman, James Cleverly, defended Bailey and insisted he was misunderstood, and that he was implying black boys were drifting into crime as a result of learning more about Hinduism rather than "their own Christian culture". However, the anti-racism Hope Not Hate campaign group called Bailey's comments "grotesque". The comments were condemned by the Hindu Council of the United Kingdom who expressed "disappointment at the misrepresentation of our faith" by Bailey.

In April 2023, the Henry Jackson Society conducted an investigation on Anti-Hindu hate in schools. According to the report, 51% of parents of Hindu pupils stated that their child had experienced anti-Hindu hate in schools, while less than 1% of schools surveyed had reported any anti-Hindu related incidents in the last five years. They also found that many Muslim students had bullied their Hindu classmates on religious grounds, The Telegraph reported, quoting the study, claimed that Muslim pupils called for Hindus to convert or face "threats of hell for disbelievers" using terms such as "kaffir". In one example, a child "was harassed and told that if they converted to Islam, their life will become so much easier" and another was told, "You aren't going to survive very long... If you want to go to paradise, you'll have to come to Islam... Hindus are the herbivores at the bottom of the food chain, we will eat you up." Another parent said children were told to watch videos of an Islamic preacher and to "convert because Hinduism makes no sense," The Telegraph reported. According to the think tank, religious education was "fostering discrimination" against Hindus with inappropriate references to the Indian caste system and misconceptions about the worship of deities, which students felt made a mockery of them.

== British Overseas Territories ==
| Territory | Percent | Ref. |
|---|---|---|
| Anguilla | 0.42% | |
| Bermuda | 0.2% | |
| British Virgin Islands | 1.88% | |
| Cayman Islands | 0.8% | |
| Gibraltar | 2% | |
| Montserrat | 0.8% | |
| Turks and Caicos Islands | Unknown | |

== See also ==
- Encyclopedia of Hinduism
- Hindu Council UK
- Hinduism by country
- Hinduism in England
- Hinduism in Gibraltar
- Hinduism in Northern Ireland
- Hinduism in Scotland
- Hinduism in the British Virgin Islands
- Hinduism in the Republic of Ireland
- Hinduism in the West Indies
- Hinduism in the West
- Hinduism in Wales
- List of Hindu temples in the United Kingdom
- Persecution of Hindus
- Religion in the United Kingdom
- Sanskara (rite of passage)
- Sanskrit in the West
- Vedanga
- Vivaha
