= In God We Trust (disambiguation) =

"In God We Trust" is the official motto of the United States of America and of the U.S. state of Florida.

In God We Trust may also refer to:

== Film and television ==
- In God We Tru$t, a 1980 film starring Marty Feldman and Peter Boyle
- In God We Trust, a 2013 documentary
- "In God We Trust", the series finale of Euphoria
- "In God We Trust", an episode of Arrested Development
- "In God We Trust", an episode of The West Wing
- In God We Trust, a short film by Jason Reitman

== Music ==
- In God We Trust (Brand Nubian album) (1993)
- In God We Trust (Mermen album) (2010)
- In God We Trust (Stryper album) (1988)
- In God We Trust, Inc., a 1981 EP by the Dead Kennedys

== Other uses ==
- In God We Trust (play), a 2005 play by Avaes Mohammad

== See also ==
- In God We Trust: All Others Pay Cash, a 1966 book by Jean Shepherd
