= The Beautiful Violin =

Stage Play

- Written by: Adam Strickson
- Genre: Jatra

The Beautiful Violin is a play by Adam Strickson. Written in the Jatra (Bengal) style, it takes place during the 19th century in rural Bangladesh and tells the story of a tragic romance. It was co-commissioned by Peshkar Productions and the Oldham Coliseum Theatre. It was nominated for the Best New Play category at the Manchester Evening News Theatre Awards of 2002.

== Original tour ==
The piece was directed by Iain Bloomfield and toured nationally to the following venues in 2002:

- Oldham Coliseum Theatre
- Contact Theatre
- Nuffield Theatre, Southampton
- The Bradford Alhambra
- Meredith Studio, Huddersfield
- The Square Chapel, Halifax

== Cast ==
- Ahad Ullah
- Balvinder Sopal - Bhelua
- Everal Walsh - Vivek
- Perveen Hussain
- Jaleel Akhtar
- Ross Millar
