= Hinduism in Scotland =

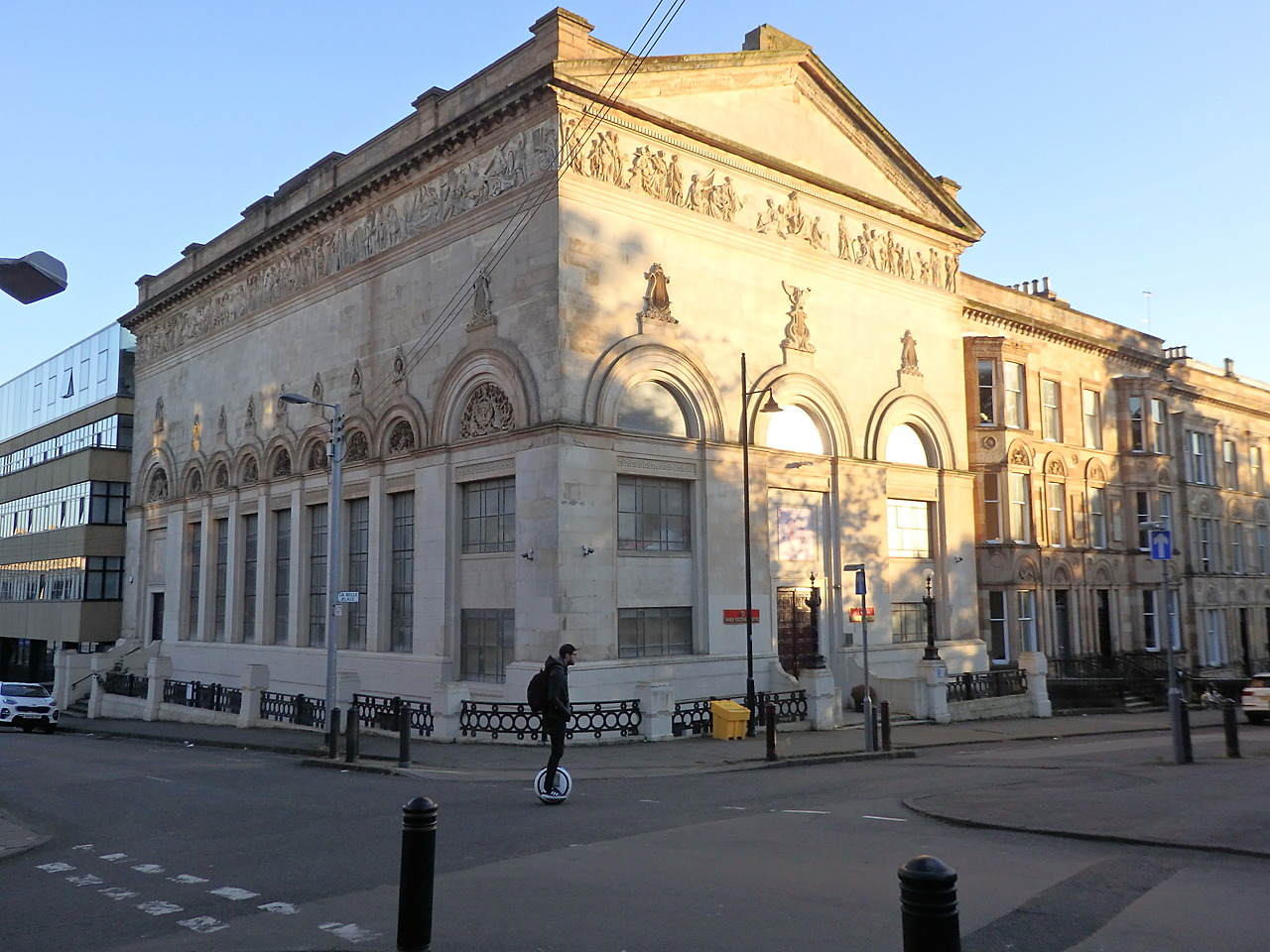
- The Hindu Mandir Glasgow in Glasgow

Total population
- 29,929 – 0.6% (2022 census)

Regions with significant populations
- City of Edinburgh: 8,459 – 1.6%
- Glasgow City: 8,166 – 1.3%
- Aberdeen City: 3,010 – 1.3%
- East Renfrewshire: 1,253 – 1.3%

Historical Population
Year	Pop.	±%
2001	5,564	—
2011	16,379	+194.4%
2022	29,929	+82.7%
Source: Office for National Statistics and National Records of Scotland

Hinduism is a minority religion in Scotland. A significant number of Hindus settled there in the second half of the 20th century. At the time of the 2001 UK Census, 5,600 people identified as Hindu, which equated to 0.1% of the Scottish population and was slightly above the number of Hindus in Wales. In the 2011 Census, the number of Hindus in Scotland almost tripled to over 16,000 adherents. In the 2022 census, this number nearly doubled to just under 30,000 Hindus, representing about 0.6% of the population in Scotland.

== Origins ==
Most Scottish Hindus are of Indian origin, or at least from neighbouring countries, such as Sri Lanka and Nepal. Many of these came after Idi Amin's expulsion from Uganda in the 1970s, and some also came from South Africa. There are also a few of Indonesian and Afghan origin.

Many of these in turn are from the Punjab region of India. Common languages amongst them, other than English include Punjabi, Hindi, Urdu, Gujarati and Nepali.

== Demographics ==
According to the 2011 census, 16,327 stated their as Hinduism, including 47 Hare Krishnas and 17 Brahma Kumaris.

== Temples ==
There are several Hindu temples across the country. A temple in the West End of Glasgow was opened in 2006. There are also temples in Edinburgh, Dundee, and Aberdeen.

== See also ==
- Hinduism in the United Kingdom
- Hindu Council UK
- Hinduism in the Republic of Ireland
- Hinduism by country
- British Asian
- Hinduism in Wales
- Hindu eschatology
- Persecution of Hindus
