= National Council of Hindu Temples =

Hindu umbrella organisation in the UK

The National Council of Hindu Temples (NCHTUK) is an umbrella body of Hindu temples (mandirs) in the United Kingdom. It connects a network of over 200 temples in the country. It supports the temples, their management, employees and operations in order to enable public access to some of the oldest heritage sites of Hinduism.

== History ==
The council was established in 1978 and draws membership from more than 80 temples across the country, acting as a resource and consultative body on matters relating to the British Hindu community. NCHTUK is a registered charity in England and Wales. According to its entry with the Charity Commission, the organization operates as an umbrella or resource body, providing services, advocacy, advice, and information. It also sponsors or undertakes research.

In March 2013, the National Council of Hindu Temples UK (NCHTUK) announced the formation of the British Board of Hindu Scholars.According to the announcement, the board was established to provide an alternative scholarly voice in Indology studies and to offer expert guidance on Hindu traditions and related matters. In December 2013, Satish Sharma, the council secretary, attended the ambassadors reception in London. During the event, he represented a copy of the Valmiki Ramayana to Prince William, Duke of Cambridge, on behalf of the council. The presentation was made to mark the birth of Prince George earlier that year.

In May 2016, NCHTUK and HFB were requested by DCLG for improving the crematorium provisions in line with the Hindu traditions for cremating the dead. Later in December, the council protested the issue of £5 notes by Bank of England that contained tallow (a form of animal fat). Several temples across UK refused to accept the £5 currency as donations. NHCHT secretary Pt. Satish Sharma explained this was against the ethos of Hindu dharmic perspective and that printing currency and using substances derived from acts of violence upon vulnerable, non-aggressive creatures was not the behaviour of civilised beings. The organization was at the forefront of opposing an overreaching legislation by the UK parliament on caste discrimination in 2018.

== Roles and functions ==
The NCHTUK functions as a resource centre and advisory body for the British Hindu community. It maintains regular interaction with various departments of the British government. The council serves as a liaison to the Home office borders and Immigration agency. It facilitates visa applications for sponsored priests required by affiliated temples. The council also works with local councils, public bodies, and educational authorities. It disseminates information about Hinduism and focuses on the needs of early Indian migrants to Britain, particularly regarding the establishment of places of worship. The NCHTUK was one of the six founding members of the Hindu Forum of Europe, which was legally registered in 2006.

== Educational activities and curriculum development ==
The National Council of Hindu Temples UK has been involved in efforts to improve the teaching of Hinduism in British schools. In 2020, the council participated in a project led by insight UK to assess the state of Hinduism in Religious Education (RE) across UK schools. The project team included academic professors and experienced members of the Hindu community. Other supporting organizations included Hindu Council UK, Hindu Forum of Britain, Hindu Swayamsevak Sangh (UK), and Vishva Hindu Parishad (UK).

The project's survey findings indicated that 98% of respondents considered the study of Hinduism in Religious Education to be "low quality and deficient," while 75% felt that Hinduism was not taught in a positive light. The research also found evidence of inaccurate resources being used by classroom teachers for teaching Hinduism. Recommendations from the project included ensuring Hindu representation on local Standing Advisory Councils on Religious Education (SACRE's) building a pool of Hindu representatives, and ensuring Hinduism education resources are factual and credible and available in all UK schools.

== Celebrations ==
The National Council of Hindu Temples UK coordinates and participates in celebrations of major Hindu festivals across its affiliated temple network. In August 2020, simultaneous prayers were held across 150 temples as NCHTUK marked the laying of the foundation stone of the Ram Mandir at Ayodhya.

The council has also played a significant role in celebrating Diwali in London. NCHTUK was one of the founders of the annual Diwali event in Trafalgar Square, which attracts thousands of attendees each year.

In January 2024, ahead of the inauguration of the Ram Mandir in Ayodhya, Hindu temples across the UK, including those affiliated with NCHTUK, prepared for widespread celebrations.Across the UK, over 250 Hindu temples celebrated the opening of this temple. Community events included car rallies, special aartis along with the recitations of the Akhanda Ramayan. Many in the community celebrated the occasion as a "second Diwali" to mark the return of Rama to Ayodhya.
