= Hinduism in the Republic of Ireland =

Hindus in Ireland
Total population
- 33,043 (2022)▲; 0.7% of total population

Regions with significant populations
- All Over Ireland

Religions
- Hinduism

Related ethnic groups
- Indians in Ireland and Hindus

Hinduism is a minority religion in Ireland, followed by 0.7% of the country's population. It is also the second fastest-growing religions by percentage in Ireland. There are also a small number of recognised temples in the country.

== Demographics ==
Hindus in Ireland
Year	Percent	Increase
1991	0.03%	+0.08%
2002	0.08%	+0.05%
2006	0.14%	+0.06%
2011	0.23%	+0.09%
2016	0.30%	+0.07%
2022	0.70%	+0.40%

Historical Hindu Population
Year	Pop.	±%
1991	953	—
2002	3,099	+225.2%
2006	6,082	+96.3%
2011	10,688	+75.7%
2016	14,300	+33.8%
2022	33,043	+131.1%

The 2022 Irish Census recorded 33,043 Hindu residents in Ireland, making up 0.70% of the population.

In the 2022 Irish Census, Hinduism grew by 131% to surpass 33,000 people. In 2016, the Hindu population made up 0.3% of the total Irish population, growing 10-fold as a share of the population in 25 years (from the 1991 census to the 2016 census). This made Hinduism the 7th largest Religion, ahead of Pentecostal.

According to the 2016 census, there are 87 Hare Krishnas in Ireland, down from 91 Hare Krishna's in 2011 census.

=== Age and sex ===
Hindus are younger than the general population with an average age for men of 29.5 and for women 27.3 compared with 36.7 and 38.0 for the general population. There were 132 Hindu men for every 100 Hindu women in 2016, a ratio which has fallen from 157 per 100 ten years earlier.

== Profession and Social class ==
Just over half (50.6%) of Hindus at work were in the broad occupational category 'professional'. Of all Hindus workers 15.0 per cent were programmers and software development professionals. Hindus (18.4%) were more concentrated in the higher social classes than the general population(8.1%) while 40.5 per cent lived in households classified to the managerial or technical class. Fewer relative numbers were found in the skilled manual, semi-skilled and unskilled occupations than for the general population (16.1% and 28.2% respectively).

== Nationality and ethnicity ==
Ethnicity of Hindus (excluding Hare Krishnas)
Ethnicity	Percent
Asian (other than Chinese)	79.5%
Mixed	15.42%
White Irish	1.34%
Black	1.92%
Other White	0.7%
Not stated	1.1%

In all 41.7 per cent of Hindus were of Indian nationality. This was followed very closely by Irish (41.6%), Mauritian (6.9%) and Nepalese (3.0%). Of the Hindus with Irish nationality (5,676 persons), 35.1 per cent were born in Ireland.

The census results show that 79.5 per cent of Hindus declared themselves to be of Asian (other than Chinese) ethnicity, compared with 80.4 per cent in 2011.

== Hindu temples ==
The following is a list of known Hindu temples in Ireland.

=== Donegal ===
Temples in Donegal:

- Hindu Temple and Indian Community Centre, Letterkenny, County Donegal

=== Dublin ===
Temples in Dublin:

- Nivedita House (Ramakrishna Math and Mission), Dublin
- Hare Krishna Cultural Centre (ISKCON), Dublin 1.
- Vinayaka Temple, Kingswood, Dublin 24.
- Vedic Hindu Cultural Centre Ireland Temple, Unit 2D, Sunbury Industrial Estate, Ballymount Rd Lower, Walkinstown, Dublin 12.

=== Meath ===
Temples in Meath:

- B.A.P.S. Swaminarayan Sanstha, Enfield, County Meath.

== See also ==
- Religion in the Republic of Ireland
- Hinduism in Northern Ireland
- Hinduism in the United Kingdom
- Hinduism in England
- Hinduism in Scotland
- Hinduism in Wales
- Hinduism in the West
- Hindu eschatology
