= Balvinder Sopal =

British actress (born 1978)

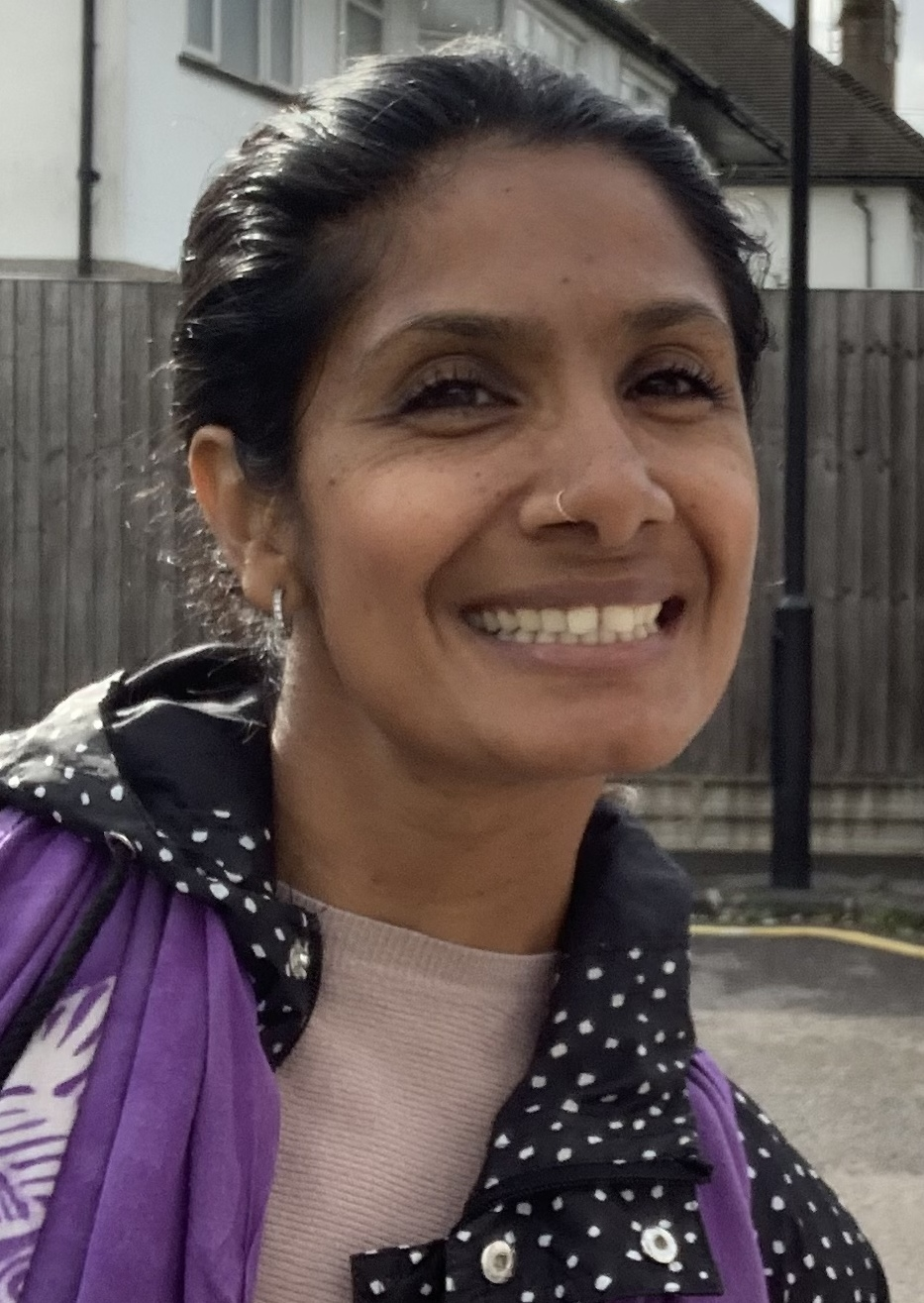
- Sopal in 2021
- Born: 4 December 1978 (age 47); Chatham, Kent, England
- Education: University of Huddersfield
- Occupation: Actress
- Years active: 2001–present
- Known for: EastEnders; Strictly Come Dancing

Balvinder Sopal (born 4 December 1978) is a British actress, whose acting career has spanned over two decades. She rose to prominence for her portrayal as Suki Panesar in the BBC soap opera EastEnders since January 2020. Sopal has also appeared in other British soap operas including Emmerdale, Coronation Street, Doctors and Hollyoaks, as well as voicing Simran Kaur in the radio soap opera Silver Street from 2004 to 2010. In 2025, she was a contestant on the twenty-third series of Strictly Come Dancing, where she reached the semi-final after breaking the record for most dance-off wins on the show.

== Early life ==
Balvinder Sopal was born on 4 December 1978 in Chatham, Medway. She is the eldest of four children and was brought up in Gillingham, Medway. She attended the University of Huddersfield.

== Career ==
Sopal made her professional acting debut as Bhelua in The Beautiful Violin at Oldham Coliseum Theatre in 2001. She then went on to appear in stage productions such as Absent Friends, Relatively Speaking and The Tales of the Harrow. Sopal made her onscreen debut in a 2001 episode of the BBC series Kidhaar! as Reena directed by Kate Rowland. From 2004 to 2010, she voiced Simran Kaur in the BBC Asian Network radio soap opera Silver Street. In 2008, she appeared in the BBC film White Girl as Fatima.

From 2009 to 2018, Sopal made numerous appearances in four British television soap operas; Emmerdale, Coronation Street, Doctors and Hollyoaks. In December 2019, she was cast in her first regular role in the BBC soap opera EastEnders as Suki Panesar. Her first scene aired on 27 January 2020. Suki's most notable storyline includes her coming out as a lesbian and her relationship with Eve Unwin (Heather Peace), which won several awards.

In 2025, Sopal was a contestant on the twenty-third series of the BBC competition series Strictly Come Dancing. She was partnered with Julian Caillon for the series. Throughout her time on the show, Sopal broke the record for competing in the most dance-offs in the show's history, having won five and being eliminated following her sixth, in the semi-final against Amber Davies and Nikita Kuzmin.

== Filmography ==
=== Film ===
Film roles
Year	Title	Role	Notes
2005	Anatomy of a Crime	Dr Ali	Film
2012	Naachle London	Laxmi Khan	
2012	Perfume	Mam	Short film
2014	Honeycomb Lodge	Jas' Girlfriend	

=== Television ===
Television roles
Year	Title	Role	Notes
2002	Kidhaar!	Reena	1 episode
2008	White Girl	Fatima	Television film
2009	Coming Up	Sofia	Episode: "Adha Cup"
2009, 2014, 2017–2018	Emmerdale	Legal Aid Solicitor / DC Graves / DC Khan	5 episodes
2010	Five Days	Detainee's Wife	Episode: "Day 8"
2010	Waterloo Road	Doctor	1 episode
2013, 2017	Coronation Street	P.C. Marks	4 episodes
2018	Call the Midwife	Mumtaz Gani	1 episode
2018	Doctors	Aafiyah Choudary	Episode: "Without and Within"
2018	Hollyoaks	Liz	4 episodes
2020–present	EastEnders	Suki Panesar-Unwin	Regular role
2023	EastEnders: The Six	Herself	2 episodes
2025	EastEnders: 40 Years on the Square	Herself	Interviewed guest
2025	Pointless	Herself	Contestant
2025	Strictly Come Dancing	Herself	Contestant; series 23

== Stage ==
Stage roles
Year	Title	Role
2001	The Beautiful Violin	Bhelua
2004	Absent Friends	Evelyn
2006	Relatively Speaking	Ginny
2008	Beast Market	Various
2008	Mela	Mariam
2009	Table Manners	Annie
2009	Counted?	Various
2010	The House of Bilquis Bibi	Zainab
2010	The Tales of the Narrow Road	Mukti
2011	Behna	Masi Ji
2012–2013	The Snow Queen	Snow Queen/Goddess
2013	Our Glass House	Sufiya
2014, 2016	Stowaway	Salma/Debbie
2014	Home Sweet Home	Daadi
2015	The Deranged Marriage	Lata
2015	Storm in a Chai Cup	Reet
2015	The Edge	The Edge
2016	Sleepless	Cosima Trevison
2017	Running Wild	Mum
2017	Partition	Denise
2018	The Thing that Came to Dinner	Mrs Caldwell
2018	Delete	Sue
2019	Black Teeth and a Brilliant Smile	Mo
2019	My Beautiful Laundrette	Bilquis/Moose

== Awards and nominations ==
Awards and nominations
Year	Award	Category	Work	Result	Ref.
2020	Inside Soap Awards	Best Villain	EastEnders	Longlisted	
2020	I Talk Telly Awards	Best Soap Newcomer	EastEnders	Nominated	
2020	Digital Spy Reader Awards	Best Newcomer	EastEnders	Second	
2021	National Television Awards	Serial Drama Performance	EastEnders	Longlisted	
2021	Inside Soap Awards	Best Actress	EastEnders	Nominated	
2021	Inside Soap Awards	Best Villain	EastEnders	Nominated	
2021	Digital Spy Reader Awards	Best Actor (Female)	EastEnders	Third	
2022	Asian Media Awards	Best TV Character	EastEnders	Won	
2022	Digital Spy Reader Awards	Best Soap Couple (with Heather Peace)	EastEnders	Second	
2023	National Television Awards	Serial Drama Performance	EastEnders	Longlisted	
2023	Inside Soap Awards	Best Partnership (with Peace)	EastEnders	Shortlisted	
2023	Digital Spy Reader Awards	Best Actor	EastEnders	Fourth	
2023	Digital Spy Reader Awards	Best Soap Couple (with Peace)	EastEnders	Won	
2024	RadioTimes.com Soap Awards	Best Actor	EastEnders	Nominated	
2024	RadioTimes.com Soap Awards	Inspiring Storyline of the Year	EastEnders	Won	
2024	Inside Soap Awards	Best Partnership (with Peace)	EastEnders	Shortlisted	
2024	Inside Soap Awards	Soap Superstar	EastEnders	Won	
2024	I Talk Telly Awards	Best Soap Partnership (with Peace)	EastEnders	Won	
2024	Digital Spy Reader Awards	Best Actor	EastEnders	Won	
2024	Digital Spy Reader Awards	Best Soap Couple (with Peace)	EastEnders	Second	
