= Bryan Savery =

British theatre manager

Bryan Savery is an English arts manager and producer of film and theatre. He is the producer for The Red Room Theatre Company, projects producer for Somerset House, the Associate Producer for Peshkar Productions and consultant for the Waltham Forrest Cinema Project. As well producing theatre and Film he is a Fellow of the Royal Society of Arts, Trustee of the Queen's Theatre, sits on the board of the Unicorn Theatre and is a former Vice Chair of the Independent Theatre Council (2003–2009). In 2012, he was given Freedom of the City of London.

== Career ==
Savery's most recent theatre project is the Oikos Project. With the Oikos Project he produced the UK's first fully recycled Theatre. Together with Topher Campbell he led a project that didn't have any resources to the point where it involved over 500 active participants, 4000 visitors, reported in 80 countries and won 5 Uk and European awards. As a result of the success of the Oikos Project he was appointed special advisor to Tearon Paris.

=== Previous work ===
Other recent roles include reviewing the national strategy of arts funding for the Arts Council England, The Society of London Theatre, Box Clever Theatre Company and Theatre Royal Stratford East. In 2011–2012, he is producing an opera for Somerset House that will be performed simultaneously in Rio and Cape Town as part of World Stages.

He was also executive director of the Hampstead Theatre, executive director of the Tamasha Theatre Company, general manager of the Almeida Theatre, and administrator of Caught in the Act Young Peoples Theatre Company.

== Theatre ==
=== As Executive Producer ===
- Fourteen Songs, Two Weddings and a Funeral (2001)
- Unstated (2008)
- Desert Boy (2009)
- Oikos (2010)
- Protozoa (2010)

== Television ==
=== As producer ===
- Invisible (2012) – Channel 4

== Filmography ==
=== As Executive Producer ===
- Oikos, a Journey in Wood (2010)
- Invisible (2012) – Channel 4

== Awards ==
- Small Projects Award (2010)
