= Peshkar Productions =

English theatre and multimedia art company

Peshkar Productions logo.

Peshkar Productions is an intercultural theatre and multimedia art company based in the Northwest of England. It engages in participatory projects and professional productions.

== History ==
Peshkar was founded in 1991, through a series of Asian Arts workshops by Oldham Metropolitan Borough Council's (OMBC) Arts Development programme. The workshops were based on Asian music, dance and drama, involving members of the local Asian community with little experience in the performing arts. The success of the workshops and the enthusiasm of the participants led to the formation of Peshkar as a company with a role to promote the arts within the local Asian community by providing a forum for cultural expression.

Between 1991 and 1998 the company operated as a project within the OMBC Arts and Events Unit, gaining funding from North West Arts Board and other local funding sources to run a series of participatory workshop programmes and theatre productions, employing a professional creative team to work with Peshkar's company of participants from the local community.

In 2001 Peshkar secured support from the European Regional Development Fund, which allowed it to constitute the organisation as a Company Limited by Guarantee and a Registered Charity, and develop a business plan. It secured Revenue Funding from North West Arts Board and the first full-time company director was appointed in November 2000. In 2006, Jim Johnson (theatre-maker/musician) took over as CEO and artistic director of Peshkar.

Since then, the company have continued to make work on a multi-platform basis, expanding their remit to targeting young people from a diverse range of hard to reach backgrounds.

In 2008, Sophia Rashid's Dance Without Movement was reprised at the Edinburgh Fringe. It was directed by Jim Johnson, produced by Bryan Savery and starring Yamina Peerzada from the Rafi Theatre Workshop of Pakistan as Zuhleikah, taking over from Poppy Jakhra from the production's original tour the previous year.

In 2010, following a research trip to Bangladesh, Peshkar embarked on a large-scale project entitled FutureDesh which looked at issues around climate change, the impact in Bangladesh and how it related to young people in the UK. The FutureDesh project yielded two touring theatre pieces both directed by Jim Johnson with digital design by Tristan Brady-Jacobs and set design by Christopher Keech, with music also composed by Jim Johnson under his musical pseudonym 'Jimmy's Big Tears.'

The first of these productions, co-produced with Yorkshire theatre company Red Ladder and written by Nick Ahad, caused some controversy when Philip Davies, the Conservative MP for Shipley, wrote to the Education Minister Michael Gove complaining about the production touring schools whilst promoting the Climate Change agenda. Despite not actually having seen the play, and without the term 'climate change' ever being discussed or referred to in the play, BBC Radio Yorkshire hosted a debate with Davies and Red Ladder's Artistic Director Rod Dixon.

The follow-up production in the FutureDesh project was Sudha Bhuchar's Small Fish Big Cheese, staged at the Unicorn Theatre in January 2012.

Peshkar was awarded Arts Council National Portfolio status for the period 2012–2015.

== Productions ==
- Robot 420 (1992) written & directed by Basir Kazmi
- New Horizons (1993) by Basir Kazmi, directed by Ajay Kumar.
- Chappatti and Chips (1994) by Maggie Willett, directed by Harmage Singh Kalirai.
- Masala Girls
- Jaago Get Real by Parv Bancil, directed by Harmage Singh Kalirai, choreographed by Shobna Gulati.
- The Boat Years
- The Beautiful Violin (2002) by Adam Strickson.
- The Beautifully Loose Asia Show (2002)
- Just Before the Rain (2003) directed by Iain Bloomfield.
- Masala Girls: The Wedding (2004) written and directed by Perveen Hussain and Sri Sarker.
- In God We Trust (play) (2005) by Avaes Mohammad.
- Dance Without Movement (2007) by Sophia Rashid (revived for the Edinburgh Fringe in 2008).
- Hiphoperatic(2007) by Tajinder Singh Hayer (revived in 2008).
- Passengers (2008) by Tajinder Singh Hayer
- Towards Tomorrow (2008) by Conor Ibrahiem, Randeep Kaur Assi, Sophia Ali and Tajinder Singh Hayer
- Siege (2008) by Tajinder Singh Hayer
- 1001 (2009) by Tajinder Singh Hayer
- Life in a Northern Town (2009) dir. Jim Johnson
- Northern Dust (2010) by Farhaan Shah
- Nor Any Drop (2011) by Nick Ahad, dir. Jim Johnson
- Small Fish – Big Cheese by Sudha Bhuchar, dir. Jim Johnson
