= Shri Swaminarayan Mandir, Cardiff =

Swaminarayan temple in Wales

Shri Swaminarayan Mandir
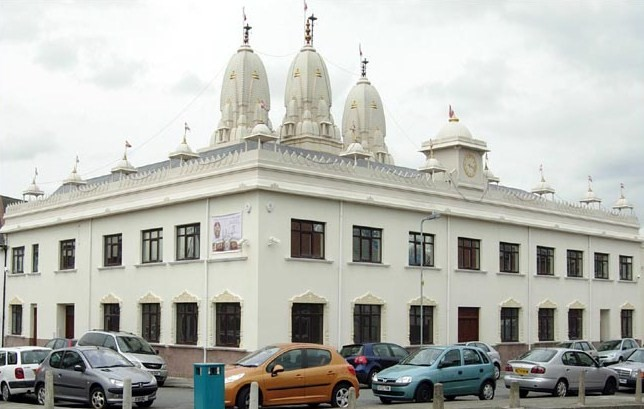

- Location in Cardiff

Religion
- Affiliation: Hinduism
- Deity: Swaminarayan in the form of Ghanshyam

Location
- Location: Cardiff
- Country: Wales, United Kingdom
- Interactive map of Shri Swaminarayan Mandir
- Coordinates: 51.47408°N 3.18622°W

Architecture
- Established: 1979*
- Completed: 1982

Shri Swaminarayan Mandir, Cardiff is a Swaminarayan temple located in the Grangetown area of Cardiff, the capital city of Wales. It is the first and largest Hindu temple in Wales and comes under the NarNarayan Dev Gadi of the Swaminarayan Sampraday.

== History ==
It is the first Swaminarayan temple in Wales, purchased in 1979, being opened in 1982. At the time, the temple was located in a converted synagogue. In 1993, it was moved across the road from the original temple site to the current site, replacing an old Irish club.

=== Refurbishment ===
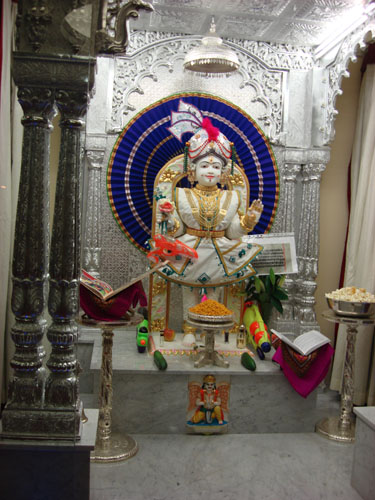
The new image of Ghanshyam installed in 2007

Between 2005 and 2007, the temple underwent major refurbishment work, at the cost of £700,000. This included installation of new marble idols in the temple, three white stone spires (the first on a Hindu temple in Wales), an exterior in the style of a traditional Hindu temple and new classrooms and living quarters. The three spires were placed above three new altars inside the building – one for women, one for men, and one mixed. Half the original temple was brought down, and replaced. During this period, services took place in a temporary room downstairs while work was under way. Most of the funds for the refurbishment came from donations within the community. The temple also received a grant of £110,000 from the Welsh Assembly Government for the repairs as well as to build disabled access to the temple.

== Community spirit ==
The temple has been in the forefront in humanitarian activities. When an earthquake struck Gujarat in 2001, devotees who originated from Gujarat collected £30,000 in just 3 days for victims. The temple priest immediately flew out to oversee relief work. Hundreds of bags of clothes were donated by the community and shipped to Bhuj, the capital of Kutch district, the epicentre of the earthquake. Similarly, later that year, when the September 11 attacks shook the world, the temple along with other religious establishments in Cardiff held a special service in memory of the people who died in the attack.

== 25th-anniversary celebrations ==
The refurbishment was completed in time for the 25th anniversary of the temple in 2007. The event was attended by Acharya Maharajshri Koshalendraprasadji Maharaj (spiritual head of the NarNarayan Dev Gadi), who installed the new idols in the temple. Around 3,000 people took part in a 1.6-mile long procession full of music, colour and dance through Cardiff to mark 25 years of the faith in the city. The procession went from the civic centre, past Cardiff Castle and the Millennium Stadium to the temple. To promote interreligious understanding, representatives of other religions were invited to join in. The procession, which was shown live on the internet, was the culmination of a week of events, held to celebrate the redevelopment of the temple.

== Diwali celebrations and visit by First Minister ==
First Minister for Wales, Rhodri Morgan visited the temple in 2008 to celebrate the occasion of Diwali. Mr Morgan was given a tour of the newly refurbished temple. During his visit, Mr Morgan presented young boys with traditional New Year's Day gifts (Bestu Varas), while young girls were given their gifts by Grangetown Councillor, Francesca Montemaggi. A musical performance was put up by the temple for the event and there was a highlight of the Diwali celebrations for guests, ending with the Aarti. The event was also attended by police students from the South Wales Police, who wished to learn more about the Hindu religion and its customs.
