= Chinwe =

Igbo name

- Gender: Female
- Language: Igbo

Origin
- Origin: Igbo
- Meaning: God owns
- Region of origin: Igboland

Chinwe // is a given name of Igbo origin. It means "God owns" (Chi = God, nwe = owns) and is generally a condensed form of longer expressions.

For example:

- Chi nwe ifenu = God is the owner of the universe or everything on mother earth belongs to God
- Chi nwe ndu = God owns life
- Chi nwe ekele or ekene = God owns thanks (thanks belong to God)
- Chi nwe ike = God owns strength
- Chi nwe aku = God owns wealth
- Chi nwe udo = God owns peace
- Chi nwe ugwu = God owns dignity

Chinwe, when used standalone, is almost exclusively feminine, but names like Chinweike are generally masculine.

== Notable people named Chinwe ==
- Chinwe Chukwuogo-Roy (1952−2012), Nigerian-British visual artist
- Chinwe Obaji, Nigerian academic and former Federal Minister of Education
- Chinwe Okoro (born 1989), Nigerian-American throws athlete
- Chinwe Egbunike-Umegbolu (born 1983), Nigerian-British lawyer
- Chinwe Isaac, Nigerian actress
