= One Nation Under God =

"One Nation under God" is a phrase from the American Pledge of Allegiance.

One Nation Under God may also refer to:

- One Nation Under God (1993 film), an American documentary by Teodoro Maniaci
- One Nation Under God (2009 film), an American documentary by Will Bakke
- One Nation Under God (book), a 2015 history book by Kevin M. Kruse
- One Nation Under God, a 2004 album by B. E. Taylor
- One Nation Under God, a 2018 album by Jekalyn Carr
