= Travel Extra =

- Type: Monthly newspaper
- Format: Tabloid
- Owner(s): Business Exhibitions
- Publisher: Edmund Hourican
- Founded: 1995
- Ceased publication: 2020
- Headquarters: Dublin
- Website: http://www.travelextra.ie

Travel Extra is a newspaper dedicated to the Travel industry in Ireland. It featured aviation, cruise and ferry news and destination reviews.

The newspaper was founded in 1995 by Gerry O'Hare, former travel correspondent of The Irish Press, which had closed suddenly in May 1995, and Tony Barry, former travel editor of the Evening Herald, with the assistance of Anne Cadwallader and John Butterly. From 2002 it was owned by the Business Exhibitions Group.
