= In God We Trust (play) =

Play by Avaes Mohammad

- Written by: Avaes Mohammad
- Characters: Hamza, Sarfraz, a prison guard
- Subject: American imperialism, philosophical divisions within Islam
- Setting: Guantanamo Bay detention camp

In God We Trust is a play written by Avaes Mohammad. It is set in Guantanamo Bay detention camp and uses this environment to explore ideas of American imperialism as well as philosophical divisions within Islam through its central characters, Sarfraz and Hamza.

== Original tour ==
The piece was toured by Peshkar Productions to the following venues in 2005:

- Lawrence Batley Theatre; 1 and 2 March
- Hawth Theatre, Crawley; 4 and 5 March
- Gateway Theatre (Chester); 10–12 March
- Oldham Coliseum Theatre; 7–9 April
- Octagon Theatre, Bolton; 12 and 13 April
- Contact Theatre; 18–21 April
- The Drum (Arts Centre); 22 and 23 April
- Darlington Arts Centre; 26 April
- Theatre in the Mill, Bradford; 29 and 30 April

== Cast ==
The cast for the play included Gary Stoner, as Hamza, Asif Khan, as Sarfraz and Roxy Shahidi playing a prison guard.
