= Inis Rath =

Island in Northern Ireland

Coordinates: 54.192°N 7.484°W

Nickname: Hare Krishna Island
- Interactive map of Inis Rath

Geography
- Location: Lough Erne
- Adjacent to: Lough Erne
- Area: 9 ha (22 acres)

Administration
- Northern Ireland
- County: County Fermanagh

Demographics
- Population: c. 15 (2022)

Inis Rath is an island located in Lough Erne, in County Fermanagh, Northern Ireland. It is also known as Hare Krishna Island. The island covers around 22 acres (nine hectares) and has been home to a small community of the International Society for Krishna Consciousness (ISKCON), commonly known as the Hare Krishnas, since the 1980s. It is one of only three ISKCON temples on the island of Ireland, the others being in Belfast and Dublin.

== History ==
=== Early history ===
The main building on the island is a Victorian mansion, built by Cavendish Butler. It was later sold to Lord Erne and became a hunting lodge. According to Manu Das, chair of the island's temple council, the property was sold on again in the 1850s to an army officer named Beresford, whose family retained it for around a century before it passed through several further owners in the mid-20th century.

=== Purchase by the Hare Krishna movement ===
In 1982 a group of Hare Krishna monks bought Inis Rath and converted the house into a Hare Krishna centre. Sources differ, however, on the precise date of purchase: while ISKCON's own account gives 1982, press coverage has variously placed it in 1984, 1985 and 1986. The purchase price has likewise been reported inconsistently, as either £120,000 or £125,000 for the island alone, while a 2002 report gave a combined figure of £190,000 for the island together with adjoining mainland acreage. The purchase was reportedly inspired, in part, by a long tradition of Irish monks retreating to islands for spiritual reflection, and by the site's location roughly equidistant between Belfast and Dublin. An ISKCON temple was created in the west wing.

=== 1987 kidnapping and brainwashing claim ===
In September 1987, the community became the subject of national controversy after a Dublin man, Tony Murphy, then 25, appeared on RTÉ's radio programme Liveline and alleged that he had been kidnapped, drugged and held captive on the island for about a week. Murphy, who had been reported missing for a week beforehand, said he had eaten a free vegetarian meal followed by ice cream he believed had been drugged at a Hare Krishna restaurant on Dublin's Crow Street, after which he was taken, disoriented, to an island on Lough Erne. He claimed to have escaped after being brought to Enniskillen Hospital for treatment of a minor neck injury, climbing from a window, crossing the lough in a leaky boat and then fleeing over the border in a stolen car.

A Hare Krishna spokesman rejected the allegations, saying Murphy had gone to the island voluntarily, and the story ran across several further episodes of Liveline, with callers invoking the language of "cult" and "brainwashing". The claim later unravelled when archive footage emerged showing Murphy taking part in a protest outside the Soviet embassy in Dublin, holding the demonstration's main banner, on a day during the period he claimed to have been held captive. Following pressure from the Hare Krishna community, Gardaí opened an investigation, and a court subsequently gave Murphy a three-year suspended sentence for wasting police time; a Hare Krishna spokesman responded that the involvement of Catholic clergy in the case "merits further investigation". The episode echoed an earlier case in 1973, when five Hare Krishna members were brought before Dublin District Court over street singing that had upset passers-by; the case was dismissed, though not before the presiding judge made hostile remarks about the group's appearance.

=== Financial difficulties ===
By the early 2000s the island's permanent population had fallen to around ten, as members left to marry and raise families elsewhere, and the community found the location isolated, costly to maintain and prone to harsh winters. In 2002 Inis Rath was put up for sale through the auctioneers Sotheby's, with an asking price of £950,000 for the island and adjoining mainland houses; interest was reported from a German pop star and a County Fermanagh couple, though no sale ultimately went ahead and the community chose to remain.

=== Recovery ===
Membership and visitor numbers later recovered, helped by growth in Ireland's Indian community, estimated at around 45,000 in the Republic of Ireland and 15,000 in Northern Ireland by 2022. By that year the community was renovating and upgrading facilities with a view to offering overnight retreats, meeting running costs of around £60,000 a year through donations and fundraising. A 2022 BBC News report also noted growing interest in the island among a younger generation of Belfast's Indian community. By 2025, however, long-standing resident Tim McEvitt described the Victorian house as having fallen into disrepair, and said the community continued to face financial difficulty due to low visitor numbers compared with equivalent temples in India.

=== Ukrainian refugees ===
Following the Russian invasion of Ukraine in February 2022, Inis Rath became a temporary refuge for Ukrainian members of the Hare Krishna movement who had fled the besieged city of Mariupol. Among them were Ruskin Khabibullin, a senior ISKCON member from Ukraine, his wife Tatiana and their teenage son, who took up residence in the temple from April 2022, while other Ukrainian families were housed with members of the wider community in the surrounding area. Some Ukrainian Hare Krishnas living nearby, across the border in Ballyconnell, continued to visit the temple regularly.

== Community and daily life ==
ISKCON, commonly known as the Hare Krishna movement, was founded in the 1960s as an offshoot of the wider Hindu tradition and claims around one million members worldwide. Devotion centres on the god Krishna, and the movement's teachings draw heavily on the Bhagavad Gita. Notable adherents of the wider movement have included the former Beatle George Harrison, who was an early supporter of the faith.

The permanent population of the island has fluctuated considerably over time: around ten residents in 2002, roughly twelve in 2016 (rising to as many as twenty during festivals and when families are included), and approximately fifteen by 2022, with additional visitors attending regularly for ceremonies. Many long-term residents have come from Eastern Europe and other countries outside Ireland. A typical day begins as early as 3.30am, with residents taking part in a continuous chant of the Hare Krishna mantra lasting up to two hours; as of 2025 this practice had reportedly continued daily since the temple's founding.

The island's upkeep is funded by a small number of regular donors and by fundraising events. Fermanagh District Council has supported the community at various points, including a £10,000 grant towards maintaining the building and a further £50,000 from another funding body to assist with visitor facilities, in addition to a smaller £200 tourism grant in 2002.

== Grounds and wildlife ==
Inis Rath has a 22-acre nature reserve which is open to the public. The grounds include gardens, allotments used to grow vegetables, grazing land for cattle, children's play areas, a school and woodland walks. The island is home to a variety of animals, including peacocks, wild and domesticated deer, pigs and dogs, as well as a herd of cattle regarded as sacred within the Hare Krishna tradition and kept for milk rather than meat. Visitors are requested not to eat meat, smoke or drink alcohol while on the island.

As of 2022, fire and building regulations prevented visitors from staying on the island overnight, though the community was raising funds at the time to allow overnight retreats in future.

== Visitors and festivals ==
The island attracts visitors throughout the year, particularly for the Hindu festival of Janmashtami, which marks the appearance day of Krishna and can draw hundreds, and on occasion over a thousand, visitors, including members of Northern Ireland's Indian community. In 2010 an open day held at the temple attracted around 600 local visitors.
