= Cauvery Madhavan =

Indian born writer

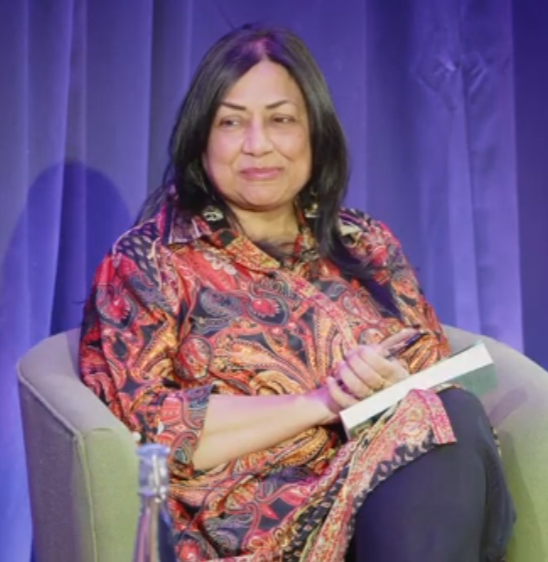
- At the British Library's Irish Writers' Weekend in 2024
- Born: Madras, India
- Occupation: Writer

Cauvery Madhavan is an Indian-born writer living in Ireland who uses her experience of being a migrant in her writing.

== Biography ==
Cauvery Madhavan was born in Madras, India to Major C. Guruswamy and Bollamma Guruswamy where she worked as a copy writer. She married and in 1987 she and her husband, surgeon Prakash Madhavan, moved to Straffan, County Kildare, Ireland. They have three children. Madhavan had her first novel published in 2000. Madhavan credited her first novel to the Anam Cara writers' and artists' retreat in West Cork where she began it. Her second novel came out in 2003 and her third in 2020. Her work relates Ireland and Europe with India. Madhavan also writes for the Irish Times and wrote for the Evening Herald and Travel Extra.

== Bibliography ==
- Paddy Indian. BlackAmber Books. 2001. ISBN 978-1-901969-04-7.
- The Uncoupling. BlackAmber. 2003. ISBN 978-1-901969-10-8.
- The Tainted. HopeRoad Publishing Limited. 2020. ISBN 978-1-9164671-8-7.
