= Amani Naphtali =

English dramatist

Amani Naphtali is an English dramatist, creative writer, director, film maker, cultural historian and ritual dramaturgist. He wrote and directed the experimental films, Le Bohemian Noir and the fiction film Circles of Fire. Amani is the brother of Maureen Blackwood, a founder member of Sankofa Film and Video Collective and who co-directed Passion of Remembrance with Isaac Julien. His theatre productions also include The Remnant, Valley of the Blind, Song of Songs, The Word Temple and the reggae musical Ragamuffin. Five of his plays have been archived at the National Theatre.

== Early Life and Training ==
Born in London, Naphtali was trained at Rose Bruford College of Speech and Drama.

Naphtali was involved in the British Black Arts Movement of the 1980s and 1990s, through his work with the Double Edge Theatre Company and experimental film projects that explored Black British identity and African diasporic consciousness. In 1990, Naphtali took part in and received a bursary for an Arts Council Theatre Writing Scheme.

== Career ==
Naphtali began his career in the 1980s, co-founding Double Edge Theatre Company. He served as director and writer on stage productions and films focusing on Black British identity and diaspora. In 1990 he received an Arts Council Theatre Writing Scheme bursary. His plays The Remnant, Valley of the Blind, Song of Songs, The Word Temple, and Ragamuffin have been archived. In 2021, Naphtali took part in the Rural Black History Project offered a fresh perspective on rural British historiography.

In 2005 Naphtali directed a spoken word ensemble entitled The Word Temple, inspired by spoken traditions including the Last Poets and African griot storytelling techniques, the ritual of the word, the legacy of the Last Poets and the Griot tradition of Africa.

== Ragamuffin (1987) ==
A well-acclaimed reggae musical structured as a courtroom drama, where the allegorical character Ragamuffin—a symbol of Black urban youth—is tried for "crimes against the African people" (1987; revived in 2002). It juxtaposed themes from the Haitian Revolution and British race relations, and featured actor and Hip-Hop choreographer Benji Reid.

Lyn Gardner wrote in the Guardian, “it has a fierce passion and cheeky humour, as well as some terrific music and dancing, and elements of physical theatre that make most other productions seem tired and anaemic.”

== Filmography ==
- Le Bohemian Noir et la Renaissance de L’Afrique (1990): An experimental docu-drama capturing the 1980s Black Arts Renaissance in Camden Town, blending surrealism with Haitian Vodou imagery.
- The Rural Black History Project (2021): A documentary and exhibition unearthing Black British histories in rural England, particularly the Cotswolds, through "hypothetical biographies" of marginalised figures.
- Circles of Fire(1997): A fiction film exploring myth and identity through surreal visuals.
- Soul II Soul: Keep on Moving, A historical fantasy exploring African spirituality and diaspora, staged with symbolic choreography and incense-infused rituals.
- Omar: There's Nothing Like This

== Cultural Impact and Collaborations ==
He directed Michaela Coel in Talawa Theatre Company's Krunch (2009), shaping her early career. He directed Tony Hippolyte (Ragamuffin’s lead actor) and music video for Soul II Soul’s single "Keep On Movin, integrating reggae and dub into theatre. In the Pan African Cinema podcast, he stated: "We learned to stand behind nothing but our culture... breaking paradigms to bring art our audience could be proud of.

== Legacy ==
Naphtali's works are archived at the National Theatre Black Plays Archive. His 2021 Rural Black History Project reinterpreted rural historiography, while Ragamuffin remains a touchstone for debates on race and representation.
