= Hindu eschatology =

Aspect of Hindu theology concerning the end of times

Hindu eschatology is linked to the figure of Kalki, or the tenth and last avatar of Vishnu before the age draws to a close, and Harihara simultaneously dissolves and regenerates the universe.

The current period is believed by Hindus to be the Kali Yuga, the last of four Yuga that make up the current age. It started when Krishna left the Earth in 3102 BC or 5128 years from 2026. (Note: Calculation excludes year zero. 1 BCE to 1 CE is one year, not two.) Each period has seen a progressive decline in morality, to the point that in Kali Yuga quarrel and hypocrisy are norm. In Hinduism, time is cyclic, consisting of cycles or "kalpas". Each kalpa lasts for 4.32 billion years and is followed by a pralaya (dissolution) of equal length, which together make a period of one full day and night of Brahma's 100 (360-day) year lifespan, who lives for 311,040,000,000,000 (311 trillion, 40 billion) such years. The cycle of birth, growth, decay, and renewal at the individual level finds its echo in the cosmic order, yet is affected by the vagaries of divine intervention in Vaishnavism. Some Shaivites hold the view that he is incessantly destroying and creating the world.

== The Four Yugas ==
Within the current Kalpa (aeon) are 1,000 cycles of a Chatur Yuga (epoch), each with four yugas (ages). These ages encompass a beginning of complete purity to a descent into total decay, a devolution of dharmic principles.

A Chatur Yuga lasts for 4.32 million years:

- Satya Yuga lasts for 1.728 million years.
- Treta Yuga lasts for 1.296 million years.
- Dvapara Yuga lasts for 864,000 years.
- Kali Yuga lasts for 432,000 years.

=== Early references ===
The Rigveda and Atharvaveda reflect a deep concern with the nature of existence beyond death. Several key terms, such as asu (vital force), prana (breath), manas (mind), jiva (life principle), and atman (self), appear throughout these texts.

The Upanishads introduced three key ideas to Hindu eschatology: the doctrine of samsara (the cycle of birth, death, and rebirth), a redefined concept of karma that encompasses all actions influencing rebirth or liberation (moksha or nirvana), and three distinct destinies based on knowledge and actions.

=== Kali Yuga ===
Kali Yuga, the last of the four ages, is the one in which we currently reside. This epoch has been foretold to be characterized by impiety, violence, and decay. As written in the Vishnu Purana in 100 BCE:

Social status depends not upon your accomplishments, but in the ownership of property; wealth is now the source of virtue; passion and luxury are the sole bonds between spouses; falsity and lying are the conditions of success in life; sexuality is the sole source of human enjoyment; religion, a superficial and empty ritual, is confused with spirituality

— Vishnu Purana

The fourth age is ruled over by Kali, not the goddess Kāli but the demon Kali. Puranas go on to write that kings in the fourth age will be godless, wanting in tranquility, quick to anger, and dishonest. They will inflict death on women, and children, and will rise and fall to power quickly. Undisciplined barbarians will receive the support of rulers.

From the four pillars of dharma—penance, charity, truthfulness, and compassion—charity will be all that remains, although it too will decrease daily. People will commit sin in mind, speech and action. Plague, famine, pestilence and natural calamities will appear. People will not believe one another, falsehoods will win disputes, and brothers will become avaricious. As each age progresses, the human life span decreases, starting from thousands of years in the Satya Yuga to 100 years in the current Kali Yuga.

Sannyasins will wear red. There will be many false religions, and many will profess false knowledge to earn their livelihood. Life will be short and miserable. Marriage will be for pleasure alone. Being dry of water will be the only definition of land, and any hard to reach water will define a pilgrimage destination. People will hide in valleys between mountains, and suffering from cold and exposure, people will wear clothes of tree bark and leaves. People will live less than twenty-three years and the pretense of greatness will be the proof of it. Ultimately, humankind will be destroyed.

== Kalki ==
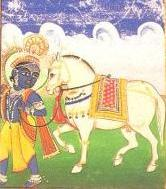
Kalki leading his white horse

At this time of evil, the final incarnation of Vishnu known as Kalki will appear on a white horse. He will amass an army of those few pious souls remaining. These, together with all the incarnations of the Godhead (avatars) which have appeared throughout human history, will destroy all evil spirit and sins in the world.

As written in the Gita:

Sanskrit

यदा यदा हि धर्मस्य ग्लानिर्भवति भारत ।
अभ्युत्थानमधर्मस्य तदात्मानं सृजाम्यहम् |

परित्राणाय साधूनां विनाशाय च दुष्कृताम् ।
धर्मसंस्थापनार्थाय सम्भवामि युगे युगे |

Translation:
English

Whenever there is decay of righteousness O! Bharatha
And a rise of unrighteousness then I manifest Myself!

Aditi is the mother of the twelve Adityas or solar deities. At the end of creation these eight suns will shine together in the skies. Kalki will amass an army to "establish righteousness upon the earth" and leave "the minds of the people as pure as crystal." Those left, transformed by virtue, will be the new seeds for a higher form of humanity, and humanity will begin again.

Puranas write:

When the sun and moon, the lunar constellation Pushya, and the planet Jupiter are all in one mansion, the Krita age shall return to the earth.

— Hooper, 1508

At the completion of Kali Yuga, the next Yuga Cycle (epoch) will begin with Satya Yuga, in which everyone will be righteous with the reestablishment of dharma and piety. This will be followed cyclically by epochs of Treta Yuga, Dvapara Yuga and again another Kali Yuga. This cycle will repeat for the duration of Brahma's lifespan of 311.04 trillion years, at the end of which a complete dissolution known as maha pralaya occurs, after which the entire cycle of creation begins anew.

=== Kalagnanam ===
Sri Potuluri Virabrahmendra Swami, wrote in roughly 15th-16th century, in his Divya Maha Kala Gnana, or 'Divine Knowledge of the Time,' that Kalki would arrive when the moon, sun, Venus and Jupiter entered the same sign. This is not a rare occurrence and last happened in early 2012, passing without event.

== Pralaya ==
According to Madeleine Biardeau, pralaya is a three-phase process. Initially, there is a devastating drought leading to the earth's desiccation. This is followed by what she terms the "double pralaya". During this process, Kalagnirudra, or Shiva, absorbs the three worlds (loka) through yogic fire. This is followed by a second absorption where Narayana, or Vishnu, reabsorbs the remains and all beings in floodwaters while resting in yogic sleep, subsequently recreating the worlds through Brahma.

== In daily life ==
On a day-to-day basis, karma is implicitly weighed and taken into consideration by practitioners of Hinduism. In fact, this perspective on the long run consequences of daily actions has been shown to drastically impact consumer expectations in India. Empirical results support that "those who believe more strongly in karma are less influenced by disconfirmation sensitivity and therefore have higher expectations," noted by Praveen Kopalle, a professor at the Tuck School of Business. Although the advent of mass consumerism took India by storm at the turn of the century, research is showing that even in urban populations, consumer expectations are generally invariant to artificial lowering of expectations in order to increase short-term pleasure. This uniquely characterizes religions that practice long-term orientation or similar framing of action.

In Hindu eschatology, karma is the central determinant in how one's soul progresses through the cyclical stages of life, death, and rebirth, as every consequence is perceived as having non-trivial weight. As a result, actions broader than the individual scope are also taken into consideration. For example, the prevalent link between Indian party politics and Hinduism has additionally led to religious-based explanations for issues the country faces. One instance of this is present in an academic journal detailing a perspective on the cause behind COVID, which states “the COVID-19 pandemic is also the cause-effect of karmic activity that caused and appeared as a novel and severe viral infectious disease. The karmic action identified as the cause of the epidemic is … a neoliberal capitalist order driven by endless greed, desire, delusion in today’s aggressive and competitive world.” In accordance with Hindu eschatology, the current epoch of humanity is the kali yuga. As a cycle characterized by widespread suffering, hypocrisy, and the progressive degradation of morality, the pandemic arrived as a calamity of biblical proportions.

== See also ==
- Hindu units of time
- Kalki
- Kali
- Eschatology
- Ages of Man
