= Hindu Forum of Britain =

Hindu organisation in the UK

- Official logo of HFB
- Formation: December 2003; 22 years ago
- Headquarters: London, United Kingdom
- Location: United Kingdom
- Website: Official website

The Hindu Forum of Britain (abbr HFB) is an umbrella organisation of Hindu groups in the United Kingdom. Scholars have observed parallels between its discourse and Hindutva organisations in India and suggest possible links.

== History and organisation ==
The Hindu Forum of Britain emerged from a "Hindu Security Conference" held in London in December 2003. The conference was organised in response to an act of vandalism in a Hindu temple in west London, which caused concern among local Hindus. The Forum was launched in response to the perceived ineffectiveness of the Hindu Council UK, an older umbrella organisation of Hindu groups. The Hindu Forum claimed to represent a widely varying number of organisations—at one point, it claimed to represent 420 different groups—but few of these were active participants. According to the Forum, as of 2011, only 36 groups had contributed to funding the umbrella group, and were thus eligible to contest elections to its national executive. It rose rapidly in prominence as the result of participating in several consultations held by the UK government, where its status as an umbrella group made the government more willing to approach it as a group representing Hindu perspectives.

== Campaigns ==
The Hindu Forum expressed opposition in 2006 to an exhibition at London's Asia House Gallery featuring paintings by Indian artist M. F. Hussain. The organisation and its allies planned a protest outside the gallery, but two of the paintings were vandalised the evening before it was scheduled to occur. The Hindu Forum and its allies denied any connection to the vandalism: the gallery cancelled the exhibition citing reasons of security. The organization also tried to mobilise support to protest against the French comedy Les Bronzés 3: Amis Pour La Vie for alleged denigration of idols.

In April 2007, Shambo, a bull belonging to the Hindu temple Skanda Vale, tested positive for bovine tuberculosis. The government ordered the bull slaughtered, a decision which Skanda Vale disputed, and launched a public campaign against. The campaign stated that as cows were sacred to Hinduism, and that killing the bull would thus violate British Hindus' right to practice their religion. The Hindu Forum joined this campaign, at one point stating that its volunteers would form a human chain around the bull if necessary to prevent its killing. The campaign was unsuccessful, and the bull was put to death.

The administration of Indian Prime Minister Narendra Modi stripped the state of Jammu and Kashmir of its partial autonomy in 2019. The UK Labour Party described the act as a human rights violation. The Hindu forum and several other groups, including the Overseas Friends of the BJP (Bharatiya Janata Party), expressed outrage at the move, and stated that its members would be canvassing support for the Conservative Party.

== Reception ==
Following the protest against Hussain's exhibition in 2007, a group of scholars published a statement criticizing the Hindu Forum of Britain. It argued that the Hindu Forum and its allies were using the same methods as Hindu fundamentalist organisations in India, thereby undermining the nation's "constitutional right to freedom of thought and expression". Historian Edward Anderson writes that though the Forum has the image of a mainstream and representative organisation, its methods and discourse resemble that of organisations with an allegiance to Hindutva. This includes efforts to control the use of "Hindu imagery", and efforts to prevent the inclusion of caste in UK anti-discrimination legislation. John Zavos, a scholar of Hindu Nationalism and South Asian diaspora politics, reiterates such concerns.

The Evening Standard reported in 2007 that the then-secretary general of the HFB, Ramesh Kallidai, maintained a close association with Hindu nationalist organisations in India, including the Vishwa Hindu Parishad (VHP). Kallidai had spoken at a conference of the Rashtriya Swayamsevak Sangh earlier in 2007, praising its founder M. S. Golwalkar, and in 2004 had defended the VHP in British parliament, describing it as a peaceful organisation.

The former Prime Minister of the United Kingdom Gordon Brown praised the work of the HFB in facilitating the integration of the British Hindu community.

== Events ==
A representative of Nithyananda attended a Diwali event held in October 2022 at the Houses of Parliament as a guest of the Hindu Forum of Britain. Nithya Atmadayananda, a prominent supporter of Nithyananda, was photographed with Bob Blackman and President of the Hindu Forum of Britain Trupti Patel. The event was attended by Rami Ranger. The brochure for the event featured a full-page advert for Kailasa UK containing images of Nithyananda.
