= HFB =

HFB may refer to:

- Hafnium boride (HfB)
- Hamburger Flugzeugbau, German aircraft manufacturer
- Harry F. Byrd, a prominent US Senator from Virginia
- Hexafluorobenzene, an aromatic organofluoride
- Hexafluoro-2-butyne, an alkyne organofluoride
- Hindu Forum of Britain
- Hochschule für Bankwirtschaft (HfB), now part of the Frankfurt School of Finance & Management
- Housing Finance Bank, Uganda
- Houston Food Bank
