= Duke Smoochem 3D =

Duke Nukem 3D mod

- Designer: Dan Douglas
- Series: Duke Nukem
- Engine: Build
- Platforms: Windows, Mac OS X
- Release: TBC
- Genres: Mod, first-person shooter, political satire
- Mode: Single-player

Duke Smoochem 3D, also known as Duke Smoochem, is an upcoming video game mod for Duke Nukem 3D, created by Dan Douglas. The mod, described by Douglas as an "interactive shitpost" and a "topical social media project", is set in the United Kingdom, and features numerous internet memes and elements of British subculture.

The mod began development after Douglas attempted to recreate Matt Hancock's office in the Build Engine, based on a detailed floor plan published by the Daily Mail, after a scandal involving Hancock caused his resignation from government. Douglas then expanded to creating a high street, before adding more politicians, representing events such as Boris Johnson's resignation. Other events satirised include Keir Starmer's role in the debate over the euthanisation of Geronimo the alpaca, the resignation of Conservative MP Neil Parish, and Piggate. Featured locations include a Greggs, a Wetherspoons, The Great British Bake Off tent and the Marble Arch Mound, the latter of which can be demolished in-game. Douglas has described his aim of "us[ing] the full array of features possible within a retro first-person shooter – level design, staged effects, wall decoration, weapons, enemies, NPCs, pickups, text prompts, dialogue, sound effects, menu screens – to bombard the player simultaneously."

The mod features original music by Lee Jackson, who composed music for Duke Nukem 3D.
