= Peanut (squirrel) =

American pet (c. 2017–2024)

- Peanut in 2020
- Other name: P'Nut
- Species: Eastern gray squirrel (Sciurus carolinensis)
- Sex: Male
- Born: c. 2017
- Died: c. October 30, 2024 (aged 6–7); Pine City, New York, U.S.
- Cause of death: Euthanized by the New York State Department of Environmental Conservation
- Years active: 2017–2024
- Owners: Mark Longo and Daniela Bittner
- Residence: Pine City, New York, U.S.

Peanut (c. 2017 – c. October 30, 2024), also known as P'Nut, was a male eastern gray squirrel. Found and rescued as a kit by Mark Longo in 2017, he was the subject of a popular Instagram account. On October 30, 2024, Peanut was seized from Longo's home by the New York State Department of Environmental Conservation and euthanized soon after for rabies testing, which yielded negative results. Peanut's death created an outcry on social media, condemnation from various lawmakers, and the introduction of a bill aimed at preventing similar incidents in the future.

== Life and social media ==
Peanut was a tamed eastern gray squirrel found and rescued in 2017 by Mark Longo. Longo discovered the squirrel's mother killed by a car in New York City. A mechanical engineer at the time, Longo sought a shelter for Peanut but was unsuccessful, and he bottle-fed the squirrel for the next eight months before deciding that Peanut should be returned to the wild. Longo released the animal into his backyard, but about a day later, he found Peanut on his porch with half of its tail missing. Longo said he "opened the door, [Peanut] ran inside, and that was the last of Peanut's wildlife career." It is illegal to keep squirrels as pets in the state of New York, and no license was obtained to legally keep Peanut. Longo has stated that he was in the process of filing paperwork to have Peanut certified as an educational animal at the time of the seizure; however, he has not explained why he did not pursue a license in the preceding seven years.

While in his care, Longo created an Instagram account sharing videos of Peanut, and by October 2024 the account had amassed 534,000 followers. Peanut's social media following also helped steer viewers to Longo's OnlyFans account, where he called himself "Peanut's dad" and produced pornography, drawing in $800,000 over one month. In April 2023, Longo and his wife moved from his hometown of Norwalk, Connecticut, to upstate New York to found the P'Nuts Freedom Farm Animal Sanctuary. They contributed to half of the sanctuary's expenses, most of which was raised through Peanut's social media presence. According to them, the sanctuary had rescued over 300 animals by November 2024; however, Longo was not licensed as a wildlife rehabilitator.

== Death ==
The New York State Department of Environmental Conservation (NYSDEC) began investigating Longo in January 2024 after complaints were received from licensed wildlife rehabilitators in the area alleging that he was keeping wildlife illegally. In a press release, the Police Benevolent Association of New York State (PBANYS), which represents the state's Environmental Conservation officers, stated that following the initial complaint, Longo was contacted by an Environmental Conservation Officer and warned that his ownership of Peanut was illegal, with Longo responding that the animal had been released into the wild. Longo later denied this in an interview with The New York Times, stating that he had no intention to set Peanut free and did not tell investigators that he had been released. The NYSDEC began its investigation after further complaints were received, leading an investigator to review Longo's social media accounts and discover that Peanut was still in his care, alongside a raccoon named Fred. The Chemung County Health Department (CCHD) Environmental Health Services received a complaint on October 19 regarding Longo's unlicensed animals and forwarded it to the NYSDEC, who confirmed on October 22 that they were aware of at least one squirrel and four raccoons being kept on the property illegally, having received three other complaints from the public on the same day. These included complaints from viewers of Longo's social media accounts who expressed concerns about the welfare of the animals depicted.

On October 30, the NYSDEC took Peanut, along with Fred, from Longo's home in Pine City, New York. Longo lied to the authorities, claiming that Peanut had been taken to Connecticut and that he had no wild animals in the home, however, both animals were located inside the home, with Peanut found in a bathroom and Fred found inside luggage placed within a closet. The Longos' social media posts were the basis for the search warrant which led to the seizure. Two days later, the department said that on the day they came, Peanut bit a NYSDEC wildlife biologist through two pairs of gloves, and the animals were euthanized to test for rabies, as there are no ante-mortem rabies testing methods for animals approved by the Centers for Disease Control and Prevention. While squirrels do not typically carry rabies, the decision was made in light of Peanut's cohabitation with a wild raccoon, as raccoons are a common rabies vector.

Longo claimed that the NYSDEC used excessive force during the raid, which, according to him, lasted five hours. In an interview with TMZ, Longo stated, "They treated me like I was a terrorist. They treated this raid as if I was a drug dealer". In an interview with The New York Post, Longo said that the NYSDEC ransacked his house and threatened his German immigrant wife, inquiring about her immigration status even though New York is a Sanctuary State. The PBANYS said in its press release that of the 12 personnel who executed the search warrant, only three were uniformed Environmental Conservation officers, who were mainly focused on securing the couple's 80-acre (32 ha) property and not seizing the animals. The other involved personnel were several plainclothes investigators who carried out the search and three NYSDEC wildlife employees. The union representing the NYSDEC's Environmental Conservation Officers said that it was the CCHD's decision to test Fred and Peanut, not the NYSDEC's.

On November 12, CCHD officials announced at a news conference that Peanut and Fred had tested negative and provided their rabies report forms to the public. They explained that the CCHD completed the rabies report forms and forwarded them to Elmira Animal Control to authorize the euthanasia at the request of the NYSDEC. The CCHD and Elmira Animal Control had been in contact with the NYSDEC and New York State Department of Health Zoonosis Program to discuss the animals prior to the seizure. Christopher Moss also stated that the county was unaware of Peanut's internet presence, though this would not have affected the outcome of the investigation. Longo told USA Today that he had attempted to apply for a wildlife rehabilitation license but was unsuccessful due to "complicated regulations". The NYSDEC has not publicly verified Longo's claim of pursuing a wildlife rehabilitation license at the time of the seizure.

Longo and his partner Daniela Bittner filed a lawsuit against the state Department of Environmental Conservation and Department of Health in the New York State Court of Claims on August 7, 2025. The lawsuit seeks $10 million in damages.

=== Reactions ===
Longo first announced the seizure on October 30 on Instagram. Longo stated that the decision to euthanize the squirrel "won't go unheard". Peanut's death triggered public backlash, social media outcry, condemnation from several lawmakers, and a proposed bill aimed at preventing similar incidents in the future. The incident has been criticized as an example of excessive government intrusion into personal lives and pet ownership rights. The union claimed in a press release that social media misinformation surrounding the case had led to threats of violence against NYSDEC staff, with New York State Police confirming ten bomb threats had been made against NYSDEC facilities in the days following Peanut's death.

The death of Peanut was used as a cause célèbre by the MAGA movement, who blamed it on Democrats. Several prominent Republican figures complained about the killing of the squirrel, with some Trump campaign supporters claiming that the Biden-Harris administration was too firm regarding licenses for owning wild animals like squirrels as pets. Both New York governor Kathy Hochul and Vice President Kamala Harris turned down a request to comment on the incident. On CNN, commentator Scott Jennings condemned the government's actions, stating "This squirrel was squirrelnapped and murdered by the state of New York, an absurd abuse of government overreach. There are 40 million rats or more in New York, and they executed the only one trained to wear a cowboy hat and had an Instagram account" and pointed to it as an example of government overreaching while ignoring its core responsibilities. The Republican vice presidential candidate of the 2024 U.S. election, JD Vance, posted on X that "Don is fired up about P'Nut the squirrel"; the official Trump campaign TikTok account also condemned Peanut's death. Donald Trump Jr. stated "Justice for Peanut! Our government will let in 16,000 rapists, they will let in 13,000 murderers, they will let in 600,000 criminals across our border, but if someone has a pet squirrel without a permit, they will go in there and kill the squirrel. That is the Democrat Party. That's where they will go. That's their overreach." Congressman Nick Langworthy stated his irritation with the NYSDEC, saying that "instead of focusing on critical needs like flood mitigation in places like Steuben County, where local officials have to struggle just to get permits from the NYSDEC to clear debris-filled waterways, they're out seizing pet squirrels." Elon Musk commented that "Government overreach kidnapped an orphan squirrel and executed him." Jake Blumencranz, a New York State Assemblyman from Long Island's 15th Assembly District, has proposed a bill called "Peanut's Law: Humane Animal Protection Act", an amendment to the New York State Environmental Conservation Law limiting government animal seizures. Speaking at an annual dinner event hosted by the Federalist Society, Supreme Court Justice Neil Gorsuch mentioned the squirrel as an example of the negative impact of abuse of government power. Gorsuch also alluded to Longo's OnlyFans account, a possible "sordid side" of the case. On November 16, Sarah Sherman portrayed Peanut's widow for a bit during Weekend Update on Saturday Night Live.

== See also ==
- Fee, Fi, Fo, Fum, and Phooey, mice euthanized after orbiting the Moon on Apollo 17 in 1972
- Gangotri, a cow killed by the RSPCA in 2007
- Shambo, a black bull at an interfaith Skanda Vale temple, slaughtered in 2007
- Marius, a baby giraffe euthanized at Copenhagen Zoo in 2014
- Harambe, an adult gorilla killed at the Cincinnati Zoo and Botanical Garden in 2016
- Geronimo, a stud alpaca at Wickwar, South Gloucestershire, euthanized in 2021
- Freya, a young female walrus killed by the Norwegian Directorate of Fisheries in 2022
