= Geronimo (alpaca) =

Alpaca in the United Kingdom

- Species: alpaca (Lama pacos)
- Breed: Huacaya alpaca
- Sex: Male
- Born: 6 February 2013; Ruapehu District, New Zealand
- Died: 31 August 2021 (aged 8); United Kingdom
- Known for: Bovine tuberculosis controversy
- Owner: Helen Macdonald
- Parents: Canchones Ferragamo ET; Chelamar Gypsy Lass

Geronimo (6 February 2013 – 31 August 2021) was a stud alpaca that resided at Shepherds Close Farm in Wickwar, South Gloucestershire, England. After Geronimo tested positive for bovine tuberculosis (bTB), a highly publicised controversy erupted surrounding his fate and the British government's policy of euthanising any animal that tested positive for bTB. After a number of court battles, Geronimo was euthanised.

== Background ==
Born on 6 February 2013, Geronimo was a male Huacaya alpaca raised at Nevalea Alpacas, New Zealand's largest alpaca farm located near Taumarunui, Manawatū-Whanganui. His parents were Canchones Ferragamo ET and Chelamar Gypsy Lass.

In mid-2017, Geronimo was sold to Helen Macdonald who imported him to the United Kingdom in August 2017. Prior to departing New Zealand, Geronimo underwent four skin tests for bovine tuberculosis (bTB) which returned negative results. He was kept in quarantine at Shepherds Close Farm in Wickwar, South Gloucestershire, from when he arrived in the UK. He later tested positive in two tests – two blood tests (enferplex) – administered in the UK. However, Iain McGill, a vet and TB researcher, said Geronimo was twice "primed" – or micro-vaccinated – before being tested for TB, which caused him to have high levels of antibodies, which in turn caused false-positive results. Moreover, Iain McGill asserts that the case could highlight large numbers of false-positive tests in cattle, and accused the government of "trying to kill its way out of trouble". As a result of the positive tests, the Department for Environment, Food and Rural Affairs (Defra) ordered the destruction of the animal to prevent spread of the disease. Macdonald has disputed the accuracy of the UK-administered tests.

Chief Veterinary Officer Christine Middlemiss described the chances of a false-positive as "significantly less than 1 percent". Full Fact described claims that bovine tuberculosis blood tests can give a false positive result if the animal has previously been tested with a skin test as "very unlikely".

== Reactions ==
The Environment Secretary, George Eustice, said in reference to Geronimo's case that "farmers understand that infected animals are a risk to the remainder of their herd, so while the loss of individual animals is always a tragedy, the farming communities have worked with our government vets in this arduous but necessary endeavour". The official spokesman for the Prime Minister, Boris Johnson, said that "The Environment Secretary has looked at this case very carefully, multiple times over the last few years, and has interrogated all the evidence with expert vets alongside the Animal and Plant Health Agency. But, sadly, Geronimo has tested positive twice for TB using highly specific, reliable and validated tests".

Sir Keir Starmer, the Leader of the Opposition, supported Geromino's euthanisation, saying he did not "think we can make an exception" with regards to Geronimo's case and that "there's no alternative, sadly. I do actually understand why emotions are so high as they would be with farmers as well who, on a not-irregular basis, have to lose animals that are very valuable to them".

The Chair of NFU Cymru Milk Board, Abi Reader, said in a video posted on Twitter that the tests "aren't perfect... but they are all we have. There's nothing else out there and you cannot keep testing until you find the negative result you want". Reader has personally lost 10 percent of her herd.

An open letter by a group of senior members of the Royal College of Veterinary Surgeons (RCVS) expressed "grave concerns" over the British Government's handling of Geronimo's case. Thirteen members of the RCVS, and one former member, have co-authored an open letter that casts doubt on Defra's approach to handling bTB. They concluded that Geronimo's diagnosis is unsafe, and urged Eustice and his team to enter into discussions.

== Campaign ==
A petition urging the Prime Minister, Boris Johnson, and Defra to halt Geronimo's killing was signed by more than 140,000 people as of 25 August 2021. The campaign received support from broadcaster and wildlife activist Chris Packham and the Prime Minister's father Stanley Johnson. A protest was organised outside of Downing Street in a bid to save Geronimo.

== Legal history ==
The first appeal hearing began in March 2019. On 9 July, the High Court dismissed an appeal to quash the judgment. In May 2021, a district judge ordered an "execution warrant"; Macdonald appealed on 29 July, but this was dismissed by the High Court. Mr Justice Griffiths said he had a "great degree of sympathy for her" but stressed the need to protect against the "serious consequences" of bTB, adding: "This is not a case in which the wishes and feelings of Miss Macdonald can be paramount."

On 17 August 2021, it was reported that the High Court had agreed to consider an application for an injunction halting Geronimo's destruction and Macdonald's solicitor said, "Defra have agreed to extend their undertaking until 17:00 on Tuesday"; the injunction was being sought while a separate application by Macdonald to the High Court concerning material non-disclosure by the government during the earlier court cases awaits a hearing date. Mrs Justice Stacey ruled against the injunction on the grounds that there was "no prospect" of Macdonald succeeding in her attempt to reopen the earlier decision of the High Court. On 20 August, Macdonald said that legal costs concerning the animal's health had so far amounted to £43,000 and had left her without any farming income for over four years.

== Death and aftermath ==
Shortly before 11:00 on 31 August 2021, three veterinary surgeons from the Animal and Plant Health Agency (APHA), escorted by officers from the Avon and Somerset Police, entered the farm to escort Geronimo away. The police briefly arrested a protester at the site who attempted to spray the police with a water pistol. Later that day, Defra released a statement that Geronimo had been euthanised by APHA.

A request made by Macdonald for an independent vet to attend the post-mortem was denied by HM Government Legal Department, prompting her to accuse Defra and APHA of concealing their processes and acting without transparency and fairness. In addition, The British Alpaca Society (BAS) lodged an official complaint with the British Government about the "disgraceful and abhorrent conduct" of APHA officers and vets who attended Helen Macdonald's premises to seize her alpaca Geronimo, stating they had improperly captured him, leading to distress, and were also violent towards the alpaca.

On 8 September, the chief veterinary officer, Christine Middlemiss said, following a post mortem, that numerous "TB-like lesions" had been found. More tests would be carried out with "the developing of bacteriological cultures", with the hope of this being done by the end of the year. Helen Macdonald and her lawyers disputed these results, stating that the preliminary findings were considered by veterinary surgeons advising her, who supported Macdonald and concluded: ".. for clarity there are no white or cream caseous, enlarged abscesses typical for bTB in alpacas whether in the lungs, bronchial, mediastinal or retropharyngeal lymph nodes." They requested a full report and other documents, in addition to tissue samples for independent biological tests.

Macdonald stated on 16 September that Defra had not provided her with details of how Geronimo was euthanised, and accused it of trying to hide information that would be contrary to its claims of the alpaca having bovine tuberculosis. Defra however responded that they had contacted her and will provide the information in due time. George Eustice meanwhile defended the euthanisation, stating that Geronimo had tested positive using the Emperplex test, which has a very low chance of error. He added that the test would have eventually given a false negative result if they had kept on testing him.

A more detailed post-mortem report, released to Macdonald in September 2021, stated that the lesions found on Geronimo's neck area were atypical of bovine TB and there was "an occasional low number of red blood cells" in his lungs. Macdonald and her veterinary advisers stated in October that the report showed that he did not have the disease and had suffered a traumatic death. DEFRA responded by stating that it would take months to confirm whether he had the disease. On 10 December 2021 Defra stated postmortem tests to establish whether Geronimo had been infected with bovine bTB had been inconclusive. The Guardian wrote, "Iain McGill, a veterinary scientist who has advised Macdonald [Geronimo's owner], said it was a "very sad day." He said he believed the failure to culture bacteria showed it was "extremely unlikely" that Geronimo had TB." The BBC wrote, "The veterinary nurse [Macdonald] consistently argued the Enferplex test was fundamentally flawed. She said the reason Geronimo had tested positive was because as part of the test he was primed with tuberculin - a purified protein derivative of bovine TB bacteria."

== See also ==
- Gangotri, a cow at Bhaktivedanta Manor, which was killed by the RSPCA in December 2007
- Shambo, a black Friesian bull, at the interfaith Skanda Vale Temple near Llanpumsaint, which was slaughtered in July 2007
- Peanut, a male eastern gray squirrel, euthanized by the New York State Department of Environmental Conservation in October 2024
