= Bhaktivedanta Manor =

Radha Krishna Temple in Watford, UK

Coordinates: 51°39′56″N 0°20′11″W

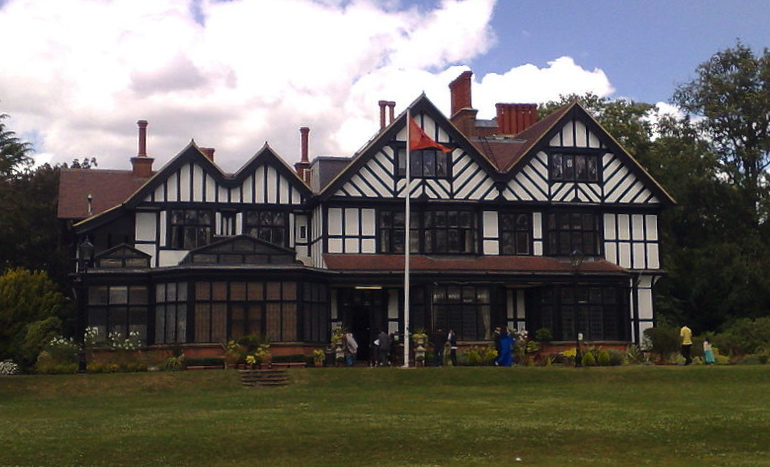

Religion
- Affiliation: Hinduism
- Deity: Krishna, Rama
- Festivals: Diwali, Krishna Janmashtami

Location
- Location: Watford, Hertfordshire
- State: England
- Country: United Kingdom
- Interactive map of Bhaktivedanta Manor

Architecture
- Established: 1973

Website
- https://www.krishnatemple.com/

Bhaktivedanta Manor is a Gaudiya Vaishnava Hindu temple set in the Hertfordshire countryside of England, in the village of Letchmore Heath near Watford. The Manor is owned and run by the International Society for Krishna Consciousness (ISKCON), better known as the Hare Krishna movement. It is ISKCON's largest property in the United Kingdom, and one of the most frequently visited Radha Krishna temples in Europe. The house is listed Grade II on the National Heritage List for England.

Previously known as Piggott's Manor, the property was donated to the Hare Krishna movement in February 1973 by former Beatle George Harrison, after the Radha Krishna Temple in central London had become inadequate to house the growing number of devotees. The donation included 17 acres of land, following which the estate was extended through the acquisition of neighbouring properties. Harrison had a close relationship with ISKCON's founder-acharya, A.C. Bhaktivedanta Swami Prabhupada, and visited him at the Manor on several occasions.

Beginning in 1981, ISKCON was engaged in a campaign to save Bhaktivedanta Manor from closure as a public temple, as the popularity of the site led to increased traffic through Aldenham. After a series of court hearings and appeals, the Department of the Environment granted permission for the building of a road bypassing the village in 1996. With the improved access, the Manor hosts up to 60,000 visitors for annual religious festivals such as Janmashtami.

== Pre-temple history ==
- 12th century: The Abbot of Westminster granted land at Aldenham to Thomas Picot.
- 13th century: The surrounding land was owned by Lord Picot, and the place was therefore named Picot's Manor.
- 1884: A mock-Tudor mansion was built on the site, replacing a Georgian building.
- 1920s: By now the name had changed to Piggott's Manor.
- 1957 to 1972: Piggott's Manor was a nurses' training college, run by St Bartholomew's Hospital as the Preliminary Training School.

== ISKCON ownership ==
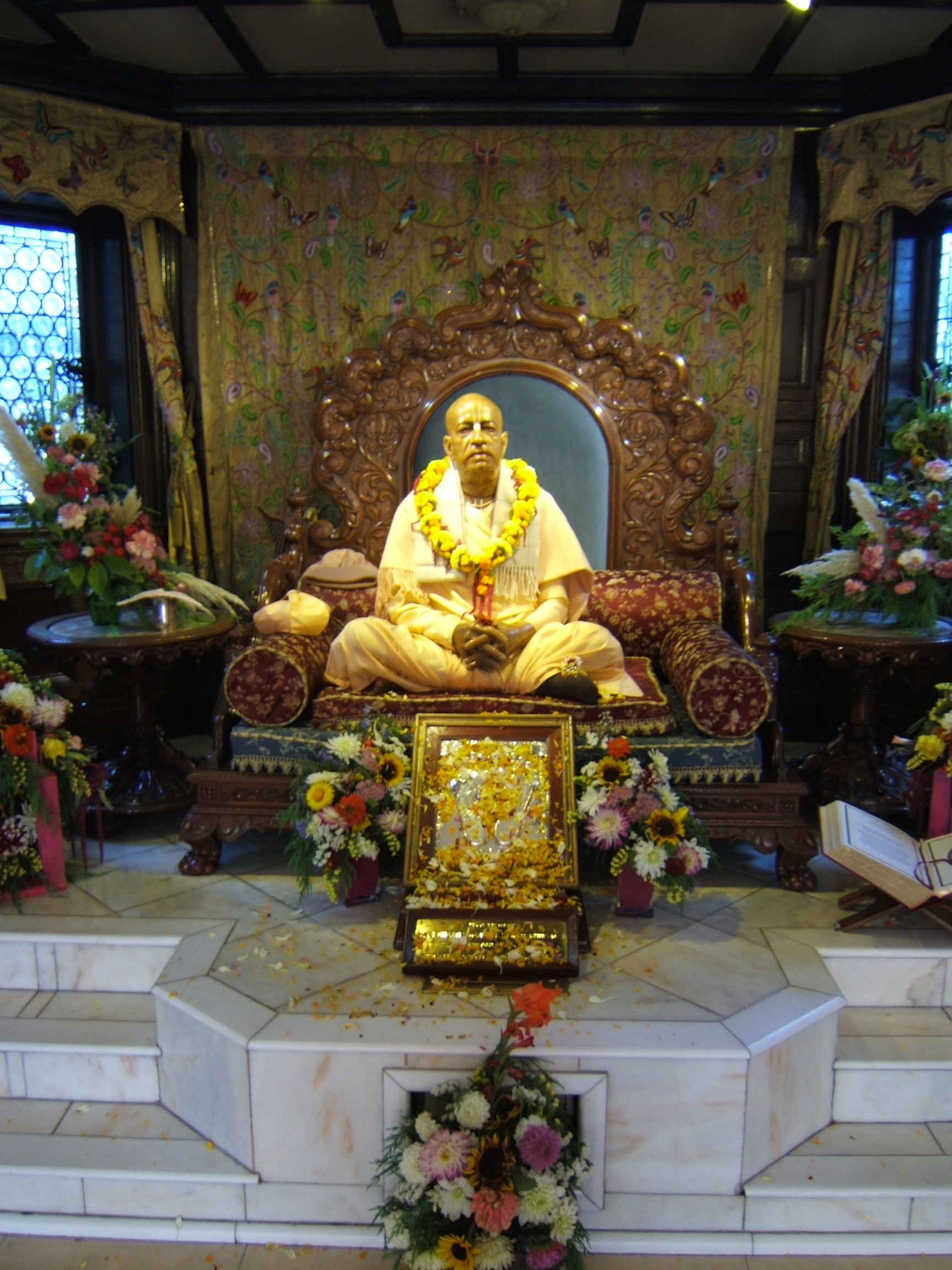
Shrine to A.C. Bhaktivedanta Swami Prabhupada, at Bhaktivedanta Manor

By 1972, three years after its founding, ISKCON's Radha Krishna Temple at Bury Place, in central London, was proving too small to accommodate the growing number of devotees there. The popularity of the movement had much to do with former Beatle George Harrison, who helped establish the temple, in addition to endorsing Krishna Consciousness principles in his 1970 solo album All Things Must Pass. One of the first British devotees, Dhananjaya Das, recalls Prabhupada suggesting that he ask Harrison if he would care to help with their predicament, to which the musician replied: "I would be very much honoured."

Harrison began looking for new premises but then left the search to Dhananjaya and others, aware that property owners were immediately raising their asking price due to the involvement of a celebrity musician. Dhananjaya came upon Piggott's Manor in the Hertfordshire village of Aldenham, north-west of London; he recalls that the owner had been considering using the house and 17 acres of grounds as a nursing home. Harrison purchased the property in February 1973 and donated it to ISKCON's London chapter.

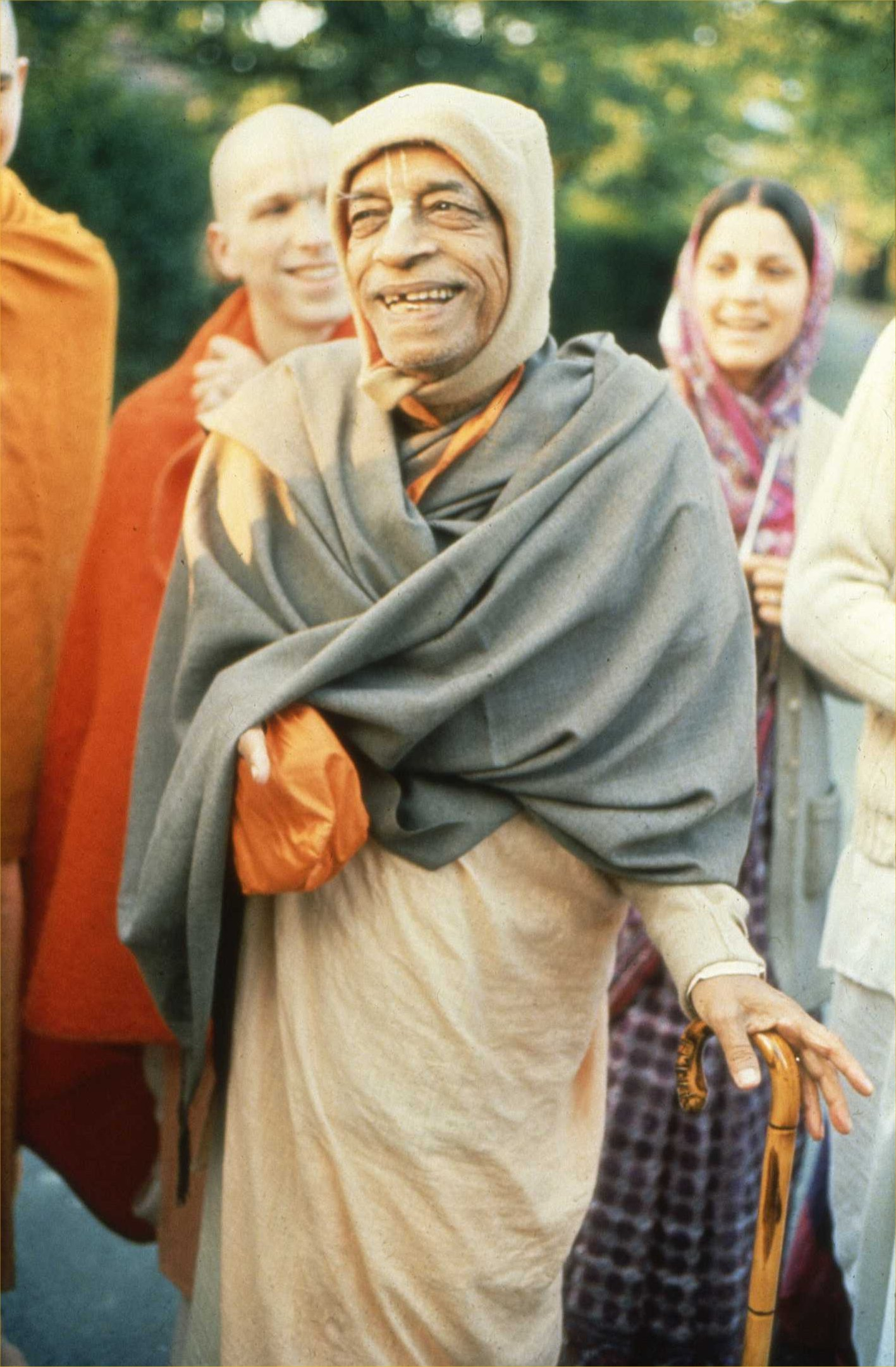
Prabhupada in Germany in 1974

The devotees endured financial hardship during their early years at the Manor, due to the substantial costs involved in maintaining the large property. A habitual international traveller, Prabhupada visited Bhaktivedanta Manor in the summer of 1973 and was delighted with the new UK base. During their meeting there in August, he told Harrison: "You have given us this shelter, and Krishna will give you shelter – at his lotus feet." Prabhupada later referred to Harrison as ISKCON's "archangel" for this and other gifts to the movement; in November 1977, while on his deathbed in the Vrindavan temple, the acharya removed a ring from his hand and instructed devotees to deliver it to Harrison. Prabhupada's final trip outside India, over August and September 1977, was a visit to the UK centres at Bury Place and Aldenham. While staying at the Manor, he became too sick to undertake a planned tour of the United States, and instead returned to Bombay before being transported to Vrindavan.

Harrison said he envisaged that the Manor would be a "guide to Krishna consciousness" and "a place where people could get a taste of the splendor of devotional service to the Supreme Lord". Coinciding with the 40th anniversary of Bhaktivedanta Manor in 2013, "The George Harrison Memorial Garden" was officially opened to the public. His widow, Olivia Harrison, together with celebrity gardener Monty Don and author Peter Owen-Jones, attended a private ceremony to unveil the garden on 25 May that year. A road on the property, which was earlier an unnamed track across a park, is now named Dharam Marg, which is Hindi for "the way of truth".

The Manor celebrates Harrison's contribution to ISKCON with an event held each year on 29 November, the date of his death. For the twentieth anniversary of his death, in 2021, Bhaktivedanta Manor hosted Evening with George Harrison, consisting of remembrances, archival film footage, and live performances of Harrison's music.

== Campaign to save the temple ==
By the late 1970s, Bhaktivedanta Manor had become a popular visiting place for London's large Hindu population, particularly since, unlike in areas of the UK such as the Midlands, it was a rare example of a local temple for Krishna worship. The 1979 and 1980 Janmashtami festivals attracted up to 15,000 visitors per day, resulting in increased road traffic through Aldenham and complaints to Hertsmere Borough Council. Having originally permitted ISKCON to use the site as a theological college, in line with the educational function that the property served under St Bart's ownership, Hertsmere Council moved to ban all religious festivals at Bhaktivedanta Manor in 1981. ISKCON subsequently acquired a property near Worcester – Croome Court – which became the movement's UK headquarters temporarily, including the site of its school. An agreement between the council and the ISKCON devotees, made in January 1983, then allowed for six days each year on which the number of people attending Bhaktivedanta Manor could exceed 1000. Financial difficulties forced the closure of the Croome Court base in July 1984, however, leading to a renewed dependence on the Aldenham property.

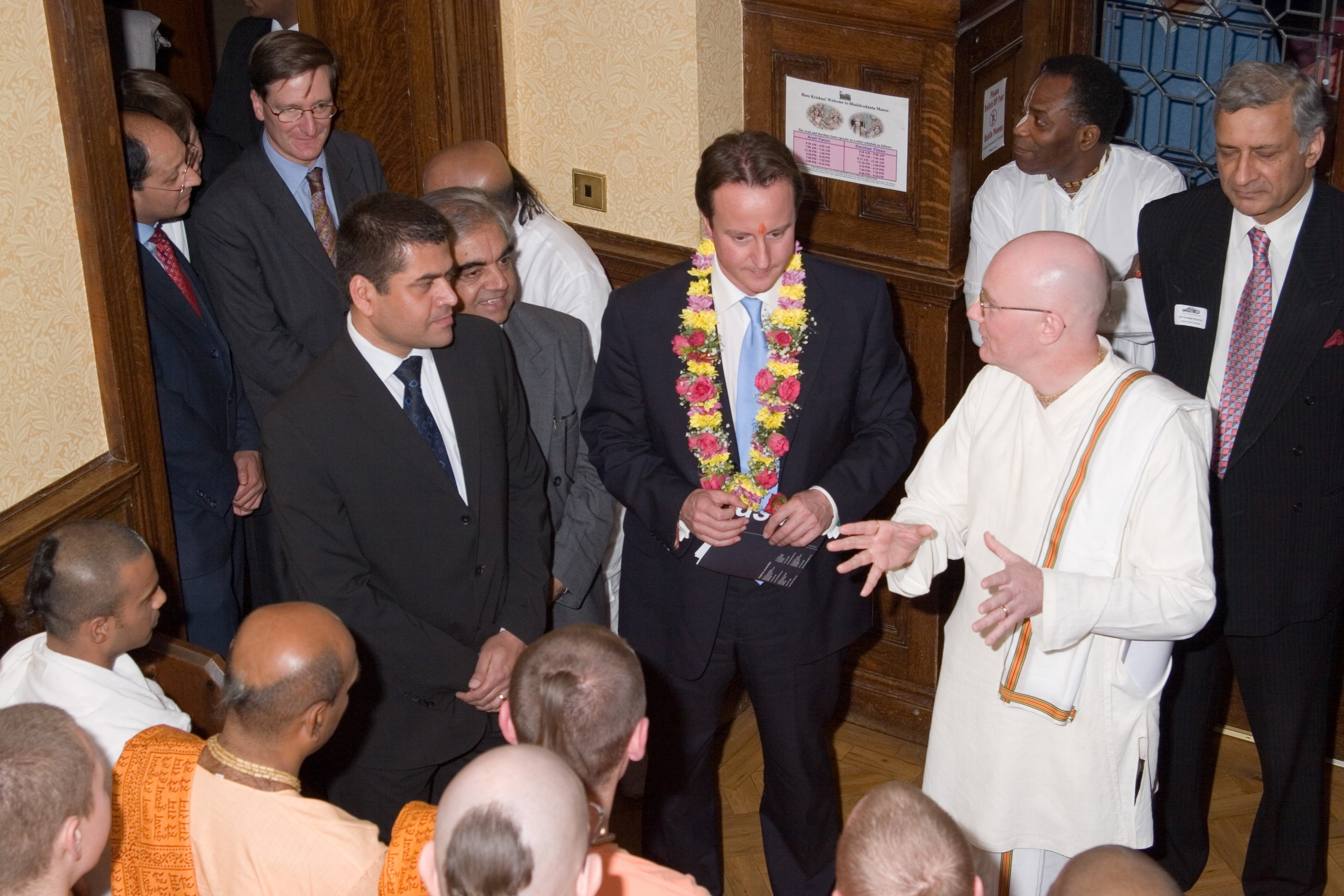
Future British prime minister David Cameron (centre) visiting the Manor in 2003

During 1985, the devotees tried to buy adjoining land to create road access to the Manor that would bypass the village. Meanwhile, the council received many more local complaints, leading it to issue an enforcement notice in January 1987 to have the temple closed to the public, citing a breach of the 1000-person daily limit. The temple submitted an appeal to the UK's Department of the Environment. A series of government inquiries over 1987–89 recognised the importance of Aldenham's position within the Letchmore Heath Conservation Area, and in 1990 the Secretary of State announced that Bhaktivedanta Manor would have to close as a temple. Appeals to the British High Court, the Court of Appeal and the European Court for Human Rights – the latter heard as ISKCON and 8 Others v. United Kingdom – all similarly failed, and a date of 16 March 1994 was set for the closure. In the months leading up to the deadline, the devotees bought the neighbouring land and submitted a development proposal to Hertsmere Council, with a view to making a road that would bring all traffic into the Manor from the A41, on the opposite (west) side of the property from the village. On the day of the proposed closure, a crowd estimated at 36,000 marched on the British government's offices at Westminster in protest, as the council deliberated over the application for a new road.

The Hertsmere councillors declined the proposal, leading to further campaigning by the devotees and, in early 1996, another appeal to the Department of the Environment. By this point, ISKCON's cause had attracted support from the BBC and members of the national Parliament. Six months after the appeal was lodged, the Department of the Environment granted permission for the proposed road, with the Secretary of State concluding:

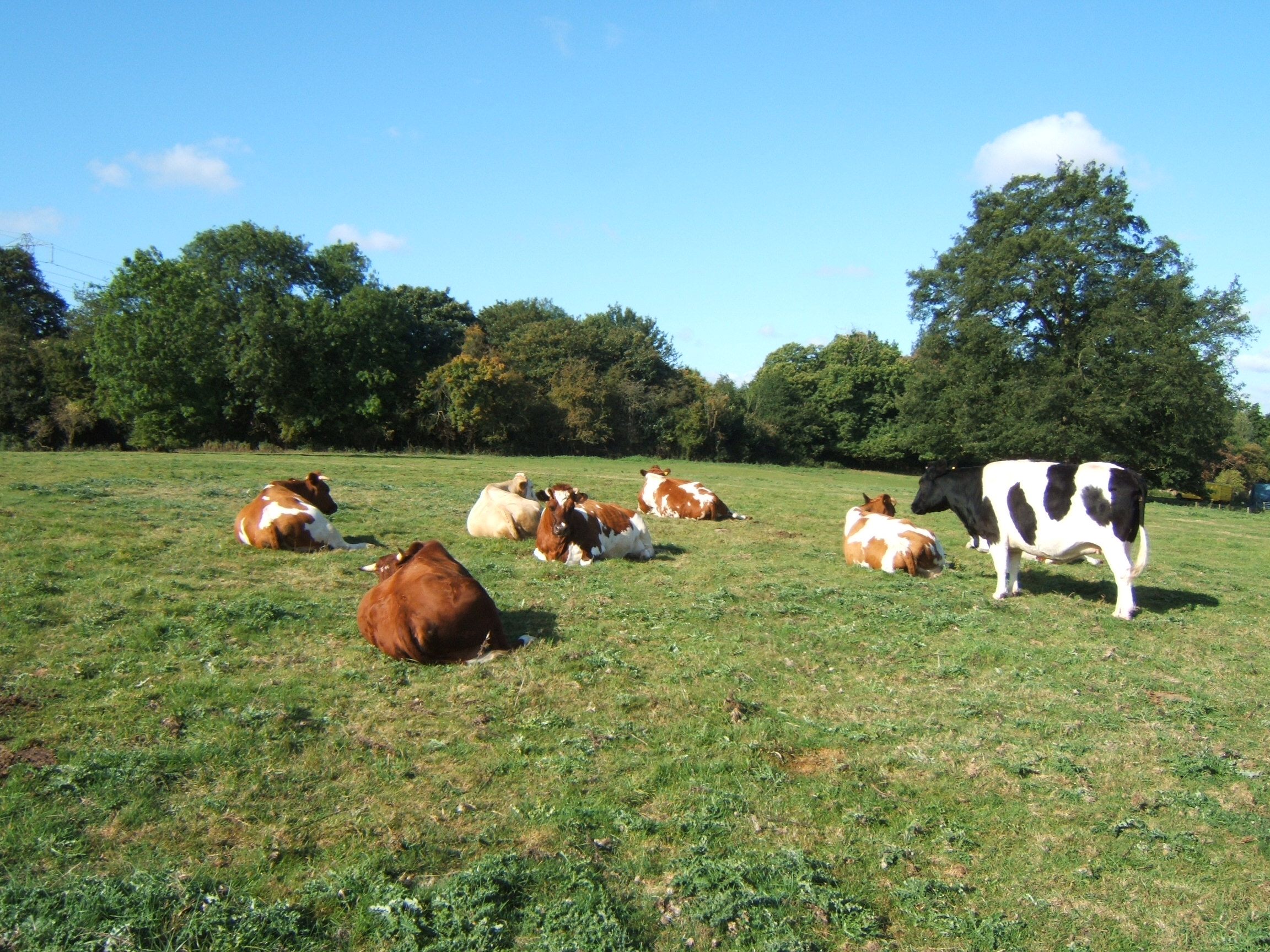
Livestock grazing in the property's designated cow sanctuary

[Bhaktivedanta Manor] is unique in the UK because there is no comparable alternative place for teaching, worship and meditation; and the level of provision of these religious facilities is to an exceptionally high standard. Furthermore, the close association of the Hare Krishna movement's founder with the Manor makes it a special, if not unique place …

The road was duly built, through what was now a 70-acre property, bypassing the village of Aldenham. In September 1998, visitors to the Janmashtami festival numbered 60,000 – a figure described by the local Borehamwood & Elstree Times in 2007 as "the average number of people" attending the festival each year. According to a 2013 BBC News report, the grounds of Bhaktivedanta Manor now include "a theological college, organic farm, herb gardens, a cow sanctuary, primary school and kitchens providing meals for the homeless" and is also home for 40 monks. In 2012, Hertsmere Borough Council adopted a planning brief to provide a clear plan for the future of the Manor including a purpose built Haveli, to meet the spiritual and social needs of the community. Construction of the Haveli was completed in 2020.

== Inside the temple ==
All activity at Bhaktivedanta Manor focuses around the temple room with its altar of carved wood and gilt containing three domed shrines. The first houses deity forms of Radha and Krishna, named "Radha Gokulananda". The second houses Gaura-Nitai deities, and the third, Sita, Rama, his brother Lakshmana and Hanuman. The rest of the property comprises a shop selling souvenirs and devotional paraphernalia, a bakery, a farm with working oxen, college facilities, ashrams, a primary school, and a small theatre. The latter is used for performances of the dramatic arts illustrating bhakti yoga and stories about Krishna.

The musician Jahnavi Harrison (no relation to George) grew up at the temple and teaches kirtan call-and-response singing at Bhaktivedanta College.

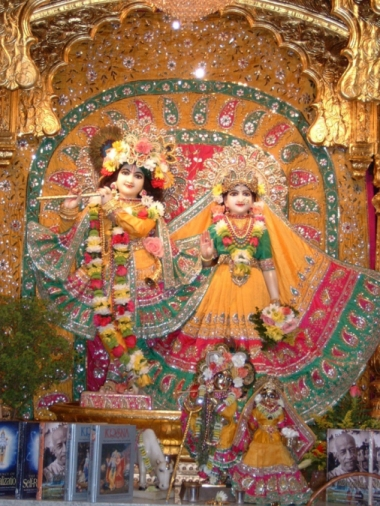
Radha and Krishna

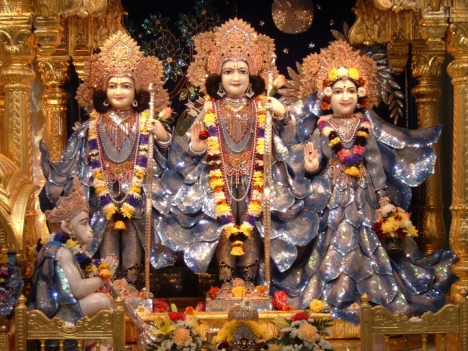
Rama, Sita, Lakshmana and Hanuman

== Attractions ==
Besides the temple Bhaktivedanta Manor has several other attractions . These include

- George Harrison Garden - A peaceful garden in memory of the late George Harrison. Here eight artworks celebrate Harrison's spiritual life and devotion to Krishna.
- Cow protection centre - An organic agricultural farm with a herd of 63 cows and bulls.
- Woodland Walk - A pathway that takes visitors around the manor. The path is marked by 16 inspiring verses from the Bhagavad Gita.
- Krishna Lila Playground - A play area for young children inspired by Krishna's childhood pastimes.
- Cafe and Gift Shop - The cafe serves vegetarian delicacies in accordance to a Sattvic diet. A gift shop is also on premises where visitors can purchase books and spiritually related gift items.

== See also ==
- Gangotri

== Sources ==
- "Bhaktivedanta Manor Memories – The Definitive History". Bhanktivedanta Manor – Hare Krishna Temple Watford on YouTube (18 July 2013). Retrieved 16 September 2014.
- Clayson, Alan (2003). George Harrison. London: Sanctuary. ISBN 978-1-86074-489-1.
- Dwyer, Graham; Cole, Richard J. (eds) (2007). The Hare Krishna Movement: Forty Years of Chant and Change. London: I.B. Tauris. ISBN 1-84511-407-8.
- Gibson, Lynne (2002). Modern World Religions: Hinduism – Pupil Book Core (Modern World Religions). Oxford [England]: Heinemann Educational. ISBN 978-0-435-33619-6.
- Goswami, Satsvarupa Dasa (1983). Prabhupada: He Built a House in Which the Whole World Can Live. Los Angeles, CA: Bhaktivedanta Book Trust. ISBN 978-0-89213-133-4.
- Greene, Joshua M. (2006). Here Comes the Sun: The Spiritual and Musical Journey of George Harrison. Hoboken, NJ: John Wiley & Sons. ISBN 978-0-470-12780-3.
- Lavezzoli, Peter (2006). The Dawn of Indian Music in the West. New York, NY: Continuum. ISBN 978-0-8264-2819-6.
- Tillery, Gary (2011). Working Class Mystic: A Spiritual Biography of George Harrison. Wheaton, IL: Quest Books. ISBN 978-0-8356-0900-5.
