= Skanda Vale Hospice =

Volunteer-based hospice in Carmarthenshire, Wales

Coordinates: 52°00′52″N 4°22′07″W

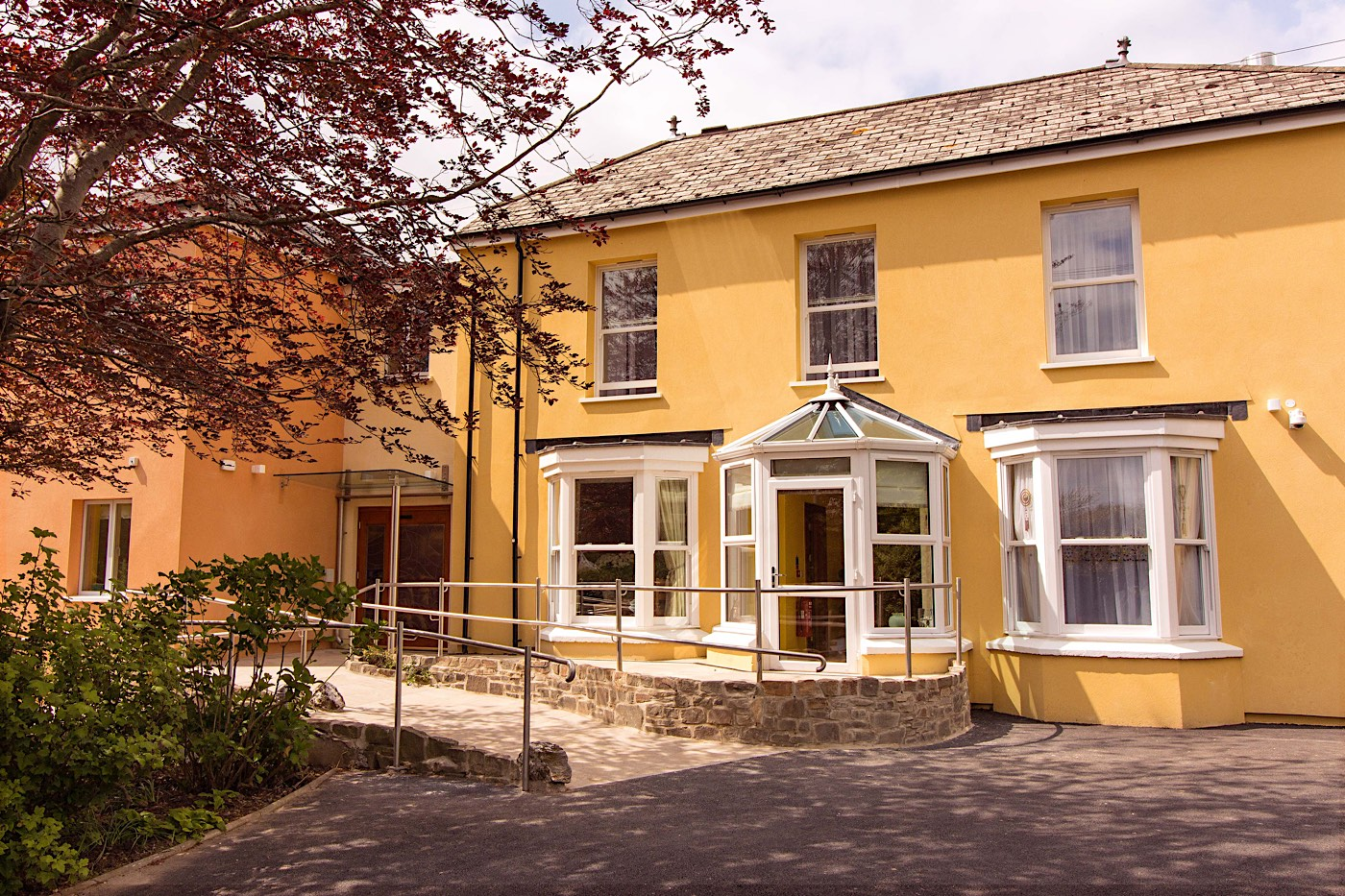
A picture of the hospice's exterior.

Skanda Vale Hospice is a volunteer-based hospice specialising in palliative care, located in Carmarthenshire, Wales. The hospice is located in the village of Saron, and while independent, it is affiliated with the Skanda Vale interfaith monastery located in the nearby village of Llanpumsaint.

The hospice is especially distinctive for its volunteer-based nature. The vast majority of hours worked are by volunteers, including in management and administration.

== History ==
Skanda Vale Hospice was set up in 1993 by members of the Skanda Vale community. The community's founder, Guru Sri Subramanium had survived a heart attack a few years before, and saw an elderly man dying alone in another bed in his ward while he was in hospital. This made him resolve to found a hospice to prevent people having to die alone without any emotional support.

== Services ==
The hospice provides respite care lasting for one week of each month, as well as day-care two days a week. Both of these services are provided for terminally ill adults, in particular those living in Carmarthenshire, Pembrokeshire and Ceredigion, although it accepts referrals from across the United Kingdom. Care is provided by paid and unpaid clinical staff, including volunteer nurses and doctors.
