= ISKCON and 8 Others v. United Kingdom =

ISKCON and 8 Others v. United Kingdom was a legal case decided by the European Commission on Human Rights in 1994. The main points of law looked at use of property and planning permissions, regarding the use of an English manor by the Hare Krishna movement.

== Background ==
In 1973, ISKCON acquired a manor for religious and residential use, which did not raise objections at the time.

In 1983, it entered into an agreement with the local authority, providing that ISKCON would not permit more than 1,000 persons to visit the manor on any one day except with the council's consent. In 1987, the local authority served an enforcement notice to ISKCON claiming the latter had not fulfilled the agreement, and besides made a breach of planning control by changing the use of the land, requiring to change the use of the land. ISKCON considered it did not breach planning control and was being deprived of its rights under the 1983 agreement by the notice. The notice was confirmed after ISKCON's appeal by the Secretary of State in 1990 and by the courts in 1991 and 1992.

== Decision ==
The Commission found the complaint to be inadmissible, by a majority. It acknowledged an interference with the Article 9 (freedom of religion) rights to happen, but, unlike applicants, considered it was necessary in a democratic society to protect the rights of residents of the nearby village and public order.

Important conclusions included that "the Commission does not consider that Article 9 (Art. 9) of the Convention can be used to circumvent existing planning legislation, provided that in the proceedings under that legislation, adequate weight is given to freedom of religion" and "statements in letters sent by Ministers and an official [...] to the effect that the decision on ISKCON's appeal against the enforcement notice was based on the relevant land-use planning grounds and that "the religious aspects of the Society's activities at Bhaktivedanta Manor were not relevant". The Commission does not interpret these statements as suggesting that the religious importance of the Manor to the members of ISKCON was not fully taken into account and weighed against the general planning considerations, but rather as making clear that the refusal of planning permisison [sic] was based on proper planning grounds and not on any objections to the religious aspects of the activities of ISKCON".

== See also ==
Bhaktivedanta Manor
