= Shambo =

Welsh bull (c. 2001–2007)

Image of Shambo

Shambo (c. 2001 – 26 July 2007) was a black Friesian bull living in the interfaith Skanda Vale Temple near Llanpumsaint in Wales who had been adopted by the local Hindu community as a sacred animal. He came to public attention in April 2007, when a routine skin test for bovine tuberculosis (Mycobacterium bovis) tested positive, indicating he may have been in contact with the bacterium that causes the disease. As a result, the Welsh Government required that the bull be slaughtered. Skanda Vale disputed this and campaigned for a reprieve, expressing their belief that the sanctity of all life is the cornerstone of Hinduism. They were backed in this stance by the Hindu religious community at large. Farmers supported the Welsh Government's policy that cattle which tested positive to the skin test are culled in the interests of other local cattle.

On 15 July 2007, Deputy High Court judge Gary Hickinbottom ruled that slaughtering Shambo would be unlawful, since the two slaughter orders had failed to give enough weight to the rights of the monks, and that killing Shambo would violate the human rights of the Skanda Vale community, which had a right to "manifest" its religious faith, according to Article 9 of the European Convention on Human Rights ("right to freedom of thought, conscience and religion"). A spokesman for the Farmers' Union of Wales called the ruling "ludicrous", arguing that it "contradicts the principles upon which successful TB eradication programmes throughout the world have been based for generations." On 23 July 2007, the Court of Appeal upheld the Welsh Assembly Government's appeal. Lord Justice Pill said former rural affairs minister Jane Davidson acted lawfully when she refused to make an exception for Shambo as a sacred bull. Shambo was seized on 26 July 2007, and confirmed slaughtered the following day. A postmortem subsequently revealed that Shambo had lesions 'typical of TB'.

== Campaign to save Shambo ==
The Hindu community launched an international campaign to save him, arguing that to kill Shambo would be equivalent to taking a human life. Temple monks said they would form a human chain to save him, asking on their website: "If a member of your family is suspected of getting TB, does the government kill them, just in case?" They collected over 24,000 names on a petition asking the government to issue a reprieve.

== Sanctity of life in Hindu tradition ==
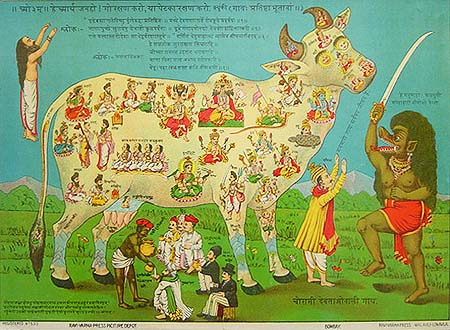
The image here illustrates the Hindu belief that each part of the cow embodies a particular deity. For example, Brahma is her back, while Vishnu is her throat. To the right, a man is seen as protecting the cow from being slaughtered by the demon Kali.

According to Skanda Vale, the sanctity of all life is the cornerstone of Hinduism. Ramesh Kallidai, secretary-general of the Hindu Forum of Britain, wrote that the cow and bull are given a sacred place in Hindu culture as a mark of respect. The cow symbolizes motherhood through the offering of milk, and the bull represents the father who tills the soil and provides grain. Kallidai writes that most Hindus consider bovicide to be equivalent to matricide, and that go raksha (cow protection) is an important part of the Hindu faith. According to Mahatma Gandhi, "One can measure the greatness of a nation and its moral progress by the way it treats its animals. Cow protection to me is not mere protection of the cow. It means protection of all that lives and is helpless and weak in the world. The cow means the entire subhuman world."

== Controversy about the test and treatment ==
Shambo tested positive during a routine skin test in April 2007. According to Skanda Vale, tests on Shambo were not accurate enough — they said it was "extremely unlikely" that Shambo was infected. David Taylor, a vet who examined Shambo, said, "he is a very healthy bull, with no symptoms of TB. It would be an absolute crime to put that animal down." He also argued that the tests were completely subjective. The Welsh Government refused to carry out a second test to confirm exposure to bacteria.

According to a report by the Welsh Assembly, whether an animal is suffering from TB can only be shown by post-mortem examination or by microbiological analysis after death, but they say the test for exposure to the bacteria that cause the disease is 99.9% accurate and is recognized by the European Union and by the World Organisation for Animal Health.

Against this, Skanda Vale argued that, if Shambo had bovine TB, he could be treated using antibiotics. The temple asked the government to grant permission for the treatment to proceed. The Welsh Government argued that, since there are no antibiotics licensed in the UK for treating bovine TB in cattle, there would be no way of testing whether he had been cured. However, Skanda Vale argues that cows are successfully treated for bovine TB in India.

== Position of the main political parties and farmers ==
Three parties represented in the Welsh Assembly — the Conservatives, Liberal Democrats, and Plaid Cymru — called for Shambo to be destroyed, arguing that he posed a danger to other animals. There were 50 animals within the grounds of the temple, including cattle, water buffalo, and an elephant.

Andrew Dismore, Labour Party Member of Parliament for Hendon, tabled an early day motion in the House of Commons: "That this House expresses concern at the decision of DEFRA inspectors, that Shambo the bull, part of the herd kept at Skanda Vale Hindu temple and monastery must be slaughtered; recognises this to be a matter of utmost importance to the Hindu community, with some 90,000 pilgrims annually visiting Skanda Vale from around the country, who regard such slaughter as an act of desecration; and urges the Government to use its discretion under s34 of the Animal Health Act, 1981, to reprieve Shambo."

David Miliband, the former Secretary of State for the Department of Environment, Food and Rural Affairs (DEFRA), confirmed in his official blog that the matter came under the jurisdiction of the Welsh Assembly, not the House of Commons.

The farming community expressed support for the government's decision to 'destroy' Shambo, citing the 5,220 cattle culled in Wales in 2006, and the 20,000 in the UK in total, as a result of the TB test. The vice president of the Farmers' Union of Wales (FUW), said "We have to follow the rules like everybody else and I won't say we don't have sympathy because you know the farmers who've lost cattle do sympathise".

== High Court decision and appeal ==
The decisions to issue a slaughter notice and to proceed with the slaughter were challenged on judicial review before the Administrative Court of the High Court, which quashed both decisions. The judge, Gary Hickinbottom, sitting as a Deputy High Court Judge, ruled that the government had failed to carry out the balancing exercise required by Article 9 of the European Convention for the Protection of Human Rights and Fundamental Freedoms (freedom of religion). The judge's decision was promptly appealed by the Welsh Assembly Government. The Court of Appeal upheld the appeal on 23 July 2007, and ruled that it was lawful to destroy the bull.

== Slaughter ==
Skanda Vale was notified that Shambo would be taken away for slaughter on 26 July 2007 at 8 am. Veterinarians arrived at the temple at 08:50 on 26 July accompanied by police and other officials, but without a cattle truck to remove Shambo. They were refused entry by the monks because they had no warrant, and left to obtain one from a local magistrate. A warrant could not be issued until they had been refused entry, according to The Guardian. One of the monks said "They will have to physically desecrate a temple to get him ... we will be having an act of worship in front of where he is. If the Welsh Government want to take him out of there, they will have to interrupt an act of worship." "Our religious laws prevent us from assisting in the killing of any life and so we will not help the inspectors remove Shambo." At 2:00 pm the officials returned with two warrants which gave them permission to enter within one calendar month, but failed to gain access to the bull. At about 4:00 pm, police used bolt cutters to get through the gate and move their vehicles – including an animal trailer and four riot vans. The bull was removed from the site at around 7:25 pm, after protesters had been removed, who had come from as far away as New Zealand and Switzerland. The animal was taken to a local abattoir for slaughter. Officials confirmed on 27 July that Shambo had been slaughtered.

== Offer of a home in India ==
On 26 July 2007, the Govardhan Charitable Trust, a sanctuary for cows in Maharashtra state, India, wrote to the temple offering Shambo a home. The Trust appealed to the Welsh Government to refrain from killing Shambo until the Trust could arrange for the government of India to approve the import. The Trust's letter quoted Mahatma Gandhi: "We should be willing to refuse to live if the price of living be the torture of sentient beings." Transportation for Shambo was organised by a supporter from Switzerland.

== Aftermath of slaughter ==
After the slaughter of the bull, Skanda Vale community leader "Brother Alex" threatened that a "nightmare" was just beginning for the Welsh Government. Secretary General Ramesh Kallidai said, "Ignorant people have chosen to desecrate our temple and have chosen to destroy life unnecessarily", and he wanted "to check how agricultural law can cater to the needs of sacred animals in Hindu temples in Britain".

The Welsh Government subsequently announced that postmortem examination of Shambo did reveal lesions typical of TB.

The Hindu Conference of Canada expressed "shock and dismay" at the decision of the Welsh government.

On 20 August, Welsh Conservatives Shadow Minister for Rural Affairs, Brynle Williams said immediate action would be vital if other animals at Skanda Vale proved positive, and the government said test results were due "soon" and that it would move "swiftly" if necessary. Bhakti, a fifteen-year-old Jersey bullock and Dakshini, a nine-month-old buffalo calf, who had tested positive for TB, were slaughtered on 24 August 2007. Post mortem examinations concluded that both did not have bovine TB.

== See also ==
- Gangotri (cow)
- Geronimo (alpaca)
- Hinduism in Wales
- Peanut (squirrel)
