= Christine Middlemiss =

Scottish veterinarian

Christine Helen Middlemiss CB
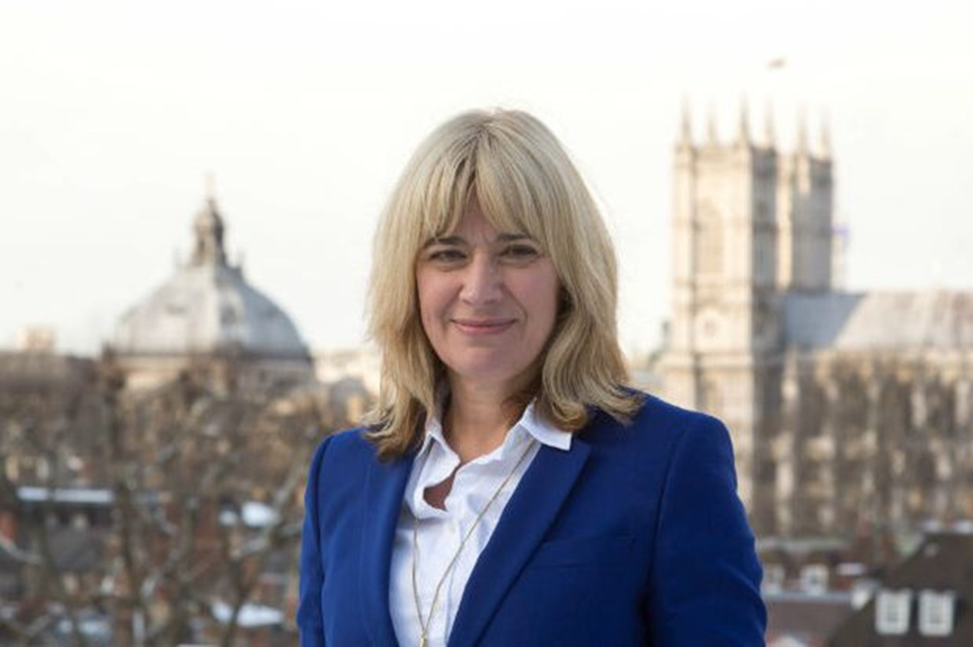

Chief Veterinary Officer (United Kingdom)
- Incumbent
- Assumed office 1 March 2018
- Preceded by: Nigel Gibbens

Personal details
- Education: Glasgow Vet School; Royal (Dick) Veterinary School
- Profession: Veterinarian

Christine Helen Middlemiss CB is a Scottish veterinary surgeon and the Chief Veterinary Officer of the United Kingdom.

== Early life ==
She was born in Montrose and attended primary school in Morayshire.

== Career ==
She graduated from Glasgow Vet School in 1992, then began her veterinary career as a mixed practitioner in Biggar, Lanarkshire. This was followed by a spell at the Royal (Dick) Veterinary School, then a return to mixed practice for several years in Northern England She joined the Animal Health Agency in 2008.

She became Deputy Director for Animal Traceability and Public Health in 2016.

=== Chief Veterinary Officer ===
She became Chief Veterinary Officer on 1 March 2018.

Middlemiss was awarded a visiting professorship by Harper Adams University in 2019.

She was appointed Companion of the Order of the Bath (CB) in the 2023 New Year Honours for services to the veterinary and farming sectors.

Middlemiss is responsible for the UK badger cull, which has seen half of the badger population slaughtered as part of controversial bovine tuberculosis measures, and she is the leading defender of the policy. She also endorsed the contentious decision to seize and kill Geronimo the alpaca after he had tested positive for bovine tuberculosis, to protect commercial cattle herds.

== Personal life ==
She lives in Edinburgh and has a rescue cat.

== See also ==
- Veterinary medicine
