= Letchmore Heath =

Village in Hertfordshire, England

Coordinates: 51.667°N 0.336°W

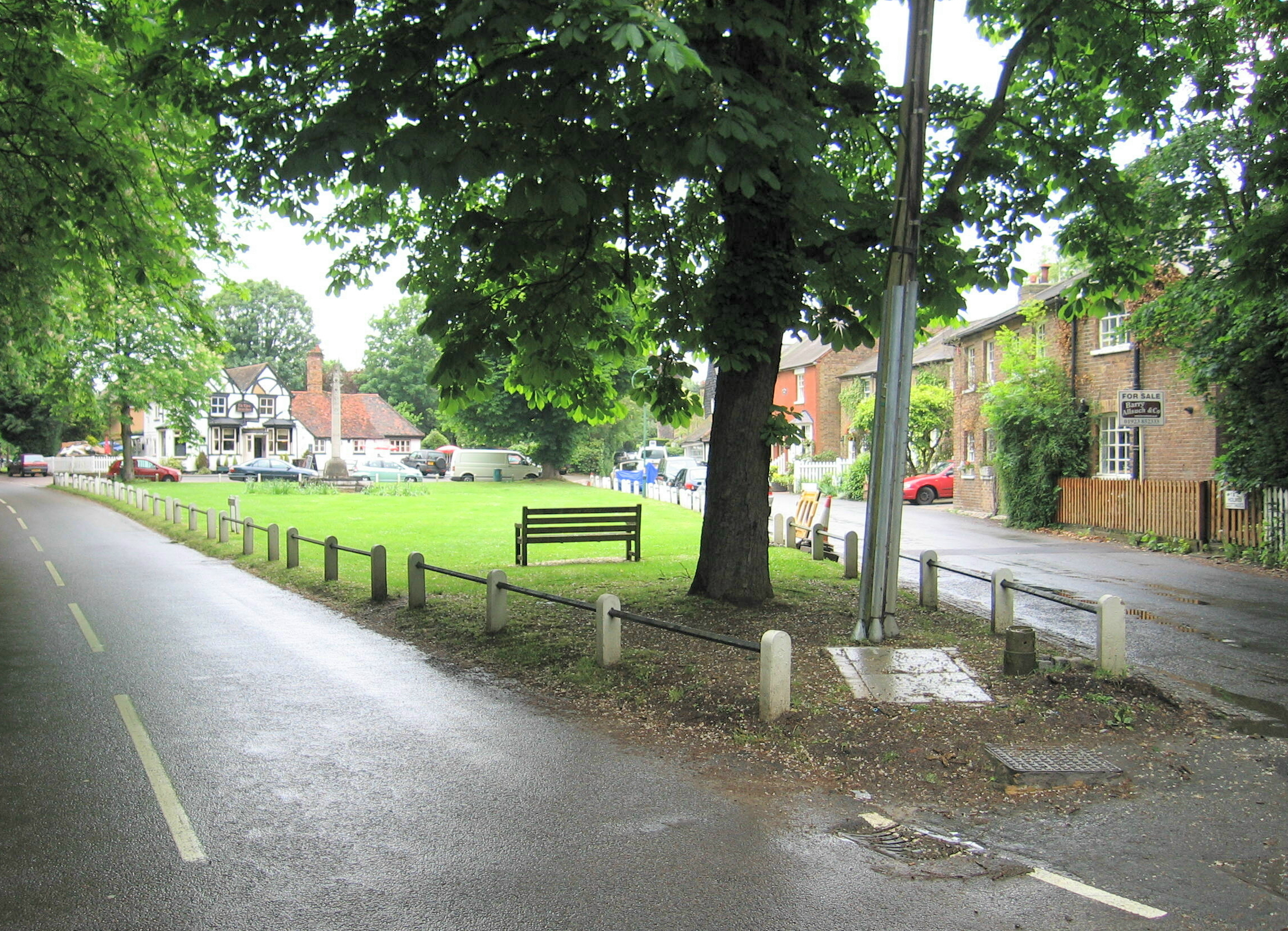
- The Green in Letchmore Heath with the Three Horseshoes pub

- Location within Hertfordshire
- Population: 470 (2001 census)
- OS grid reference: TQ151977
- District: Hertsmere
- Shire county: Hertfordshire
- Region: East
- Country: England
- Sovereign state: United Kingdom
- Post town: WATFORD
- Postcode district: WD25
- Dialling code: 01923
- Police: Hertfordshire
- Fire: Hertfordshire
- Ambulance: East of England
- UK Parliament: Hertsmere

Letchmore Heath is a village in Hertfordshire in England, situated about three miles east of Watford.

== General ==
The name Letchmore is derived from the Old Saxon "leche mere", meaning muddy pond. The present pond is located to the south of the village green.

The village, consisting of about 150 houses, lies to the east of Watford, southwest of Radlett and southeast of Aldenham.

Due to its proximity to Elstree Studios, the village has often been used as a set in films, in particular the 1960 British horror movie Village of the Damned.

It has a village green, a memorial hall (built in 1921), a pond and a pub, the Three Horseshoes, which is on the north side of the green. The hall is a registered charity, and can be hired for private events. It used to be used weekly by a scout troop, 2nd Aldenham. The Institute of Grocery Distribution is based in the village.

To the south, but still within the village, is Bhaktivedanta Manor, a Hare Krishna temple.

== Transport ==
Letchmore Heath has no main roads running through it and no public transport. It is, however, close to the M1 and M25 motorways. The nearest railway stations are at Radlett, Stanmore, Elstree & Borehamwood and Watford.

== Famous residents ==
A. C. Bhaktivedanta Swami Prabhupada (1896-1977), the founder of the International Society for Krishna Consciousness, commonly known as the Hare Krishnas, stayed in Letchmore Heath for a few months every year after establishing Bhaktivedanta Manor, a temple, in the village. He commented about Letchmore Heath, that because it was so beautiful with many forest walks, it reminded him of Krishna’s birthplace, Vrindavana. He would daily go on long walks through the village and appreciated its cleanliness.

Graphic designer David Rudnick was born in Letchmore Heath and spent his formative years there.

Novelist Joanna Briscoe spent her early years here, and the location inspired the setting for her novel Touched.
