= Gangotri (cow) =

Cow killed in 2007

Gangotri, a cow that lived at Bhaktivedanta Manor, was killed by the Royal Society for the Prevention of Cruelty to Animals (RSPCA) in December 2007. The killing of Gangotri was an issue for the Hindus of England and led to protest concerning the treatment of cattle.

== Killing ==
On 13 December 2007, police, RSPCA inspectors and a government veterinarian arrived at the Bhaktivedanta Manor temple in Hertfordshire and killed Gangotri by the administration of a lethal injection. Gangotri was not suffering from any disease, but had damaged her hind muscles and could not stand. She was cared for by the temple staff, and the temple had employed veterinarians to medically care for her and to monitor her health. The temple, donated in 1973 by George Harrison, runs the Cow Protection Project, a no-kill shelter where cows and bulls are allowed to die naturally. The RSPCA claimed that the cow was suffering; however, they killed the cow without consultation with the veterinarians treating the cow. They claimed to have consulted other veterinarians. The temple officials countered these claims as follows:

"Two veterinary surgeons, one who lived locally and the other a specialist based in Oxford, were regularly supervising the cow’s medical treatment. They were administering medicine themselves, and also guiding the daily care being given by the community members. It is normal farming practise that once a cow is down or cannot walk, she will be killed by the vet because, within a few weeks, physical complications will arise that most farmers don’t have the time to deal with. As a religious community, we made the choice to care, and those two vets chose to support us. Two other vets, who were unfamiliar with the way we work with animals, one of whom was merely a passer-by, gave different opinions. At first, the chief vet responsible for animal welfare in the appropriate government department, known as Defra, also gave a recommendation that the cow be killed. When he made a personal visit to the temple however, and saw how the animal was being cared for, he informed us that no further action would be taken".

== Protests and legal action ==
The temple officials considered legal action against the RSPCA over its actions. On 28 March 2008, The Independent reported that the RSPCA has been sued and the sanctuary claimed, "The RSPCA unlawfully trespassed on temple property and unlawfully trespassed on the life of a cow. The cow was under veterinary care and was recovering. There was absolutely no reason for her to be killed".

On 26 December 2007, about 200 people protested at the RSPCA headquarters in Horsham, West Sussex, while another 700 Hindus held prayers at the Manor. Protests were also held a few months later in March.

== Apology by the RSPCA ==
On 13 December 2008, the RSPCA apologised for the killing of Gangotri. They also donated a pregnant cow to the sanctuary, representing a symbol of reconciliation.

== See also ==
- Fee, Fi, Fo, Fum, and Phooey, mice euthanized after orbiting the Moon on Apollo 17 in 1972
- Shambo, a black bull at an interfaith Skanda Vale temple, slaughtered in 2007
- Marius, a baby giraffe euthanized at Copenhagen Zoo in 2014
- Harambe, an adult gorilla killed at the Cincinnati Zoo and Botanical Garden in 2016
- Geronimo, a stud alpaca at Wickwar, South Gloucestershire, euthanized in 2021
- Freya, a young female walrus killed by the Norwegian Directorate of Fisheries in 2022
