= Aldenham =

Village in Hertfordshire, England

Coordinates: 51.6723°N 0.3546°W

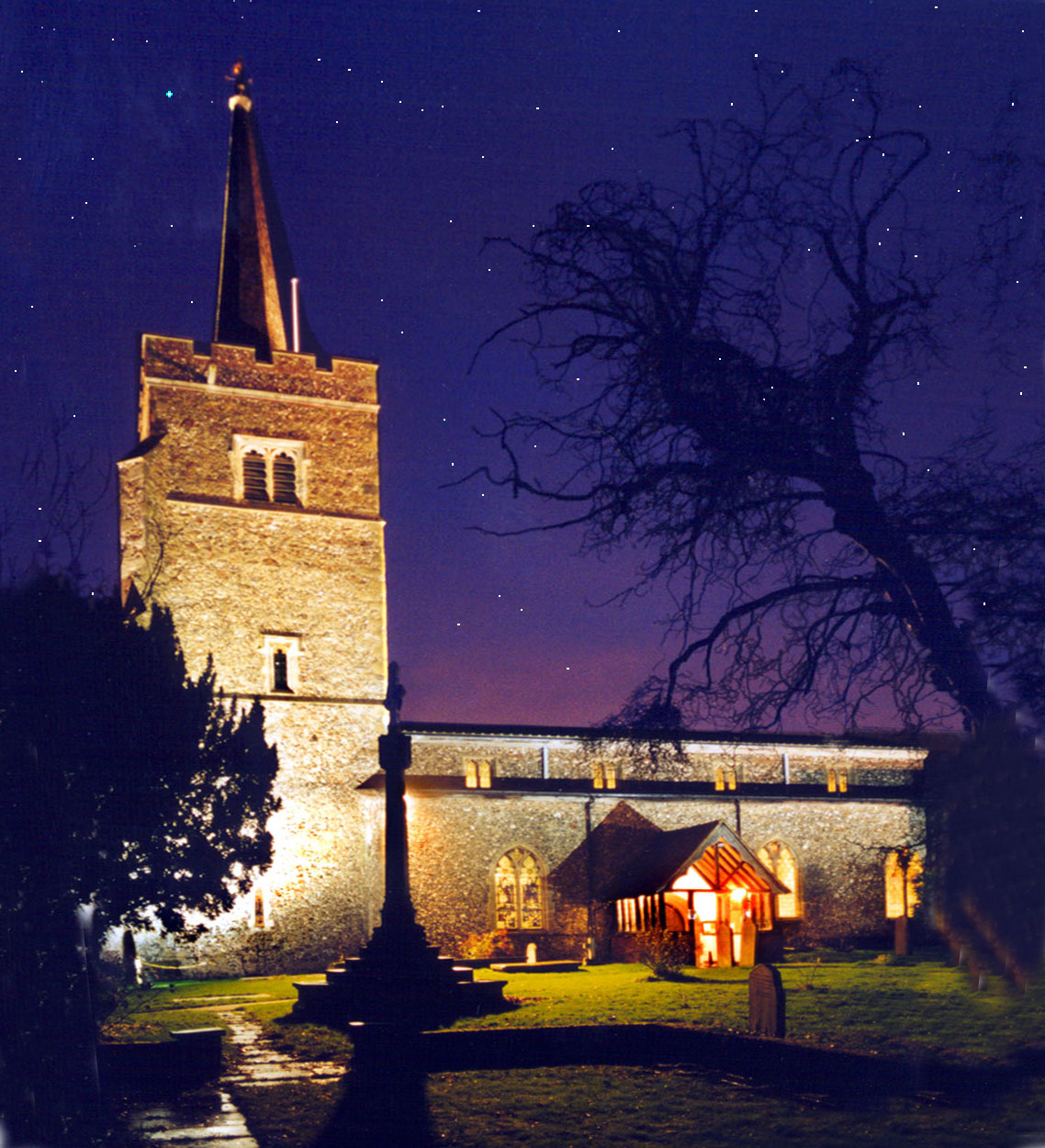
- Church of St John the Baptist, Aldenham

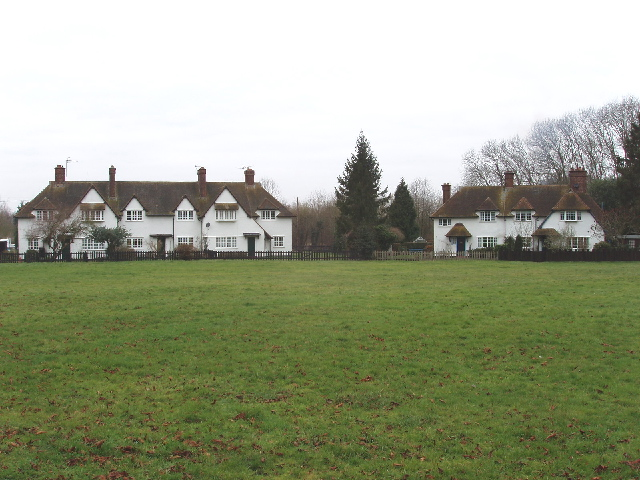
- The village green

- Location within Hertfordshire
- Interactive map of Aldenham
- Area: 8.475 sq mi (21.95 km^{2})
- Population: 9,942 (2001 census); 9,815 (2011 Census)
  - Density: 1,173/sq mi (453/km^{2})
- OS grid reference: TQ138981
- Civil parish: Aldenham
- District: Hertsmere
- Shire county: Hertfordshire
- Region: East
- Country: England
- Sovereign state: United Kingdom
- Post town: WATFORD
- Postcode district: WD25
- Dialling code: 01923
- Police: Hertfordshire
- Fire: Hertfordshire
- Ambulance: East of England
- UK Parliament: Hertsmere

Aldenham is a village and civil parish in the borough of Hertsmere in Hertfordshire, England. The parish includes Radlett and Letchmore Heath as well as Aldenham village itself. The village of Aldenham lies 3.5 miles (5.6 km) north-east of Watford and 2 miles (3.2 km) southwest of Radlett. Aldenham was mentioned in the Domesday Book of 1086, and is one of Hertsmere's 14 conservation areas. The village has eight pre-19th-century listed buildings and the parish itself is largely unchanged, though buildings have been rebuilt, since Saxon times when the majority of the land was owned by the abbots of Westminster Abbey.

In the Index of Multiple Deprivation, the ward of Aldenham East was ranked the least deprived ward out of 8414 in England, while Aldenham West also featured among the least deprived three per cent in the country.

== History ==
The parish of Aldenham historically had two main settlements, being Aldenham itself where the parish church is located, and Radlett on Watling Street, one of the main roads in the area. The two settlements were of comparable size until the modern era. Since Radlett railway station opened in 1868 Radlett has grown to be significantly larger than Aldenham village, but it remains part of the parish. Aldenham Parish Council has its offices in Radlett. The parish also includes Letchmore Heath.

In 1086 in the Domesday Book, Aldenham parish appears to have straddled the boundary of two ancient hundreds: Danish Hundred (East of North Watford, North of Patchetts Green) and St Albans Hundred (South of Hanstead). The Domesday surveyors were recording a property ownership dispute that had been ongoing for three centuries regarding heavily forested land.

The Church of St John the Baptist in Aldenham village is seven hundred and fifty years old and there is good reason to believe that an earlier Saxon church stood on the site. After the Reformation the lands were sold off to the highest bidders and Aldenham is probably smaller today than it was 500 years ago.

In 1940, a German air attack damaged stained glass and removed the "Hertfordshire Spike" – the spire on the top of the tower. Restoration work was completed in 1951.

Both the church and the village have been used in many films, advertisements and television programmes, being within easy travelling distance of Elstree Studios. These have included the film Confessions of a Window Cleaner, BBC television series Pathfinders, and the Coldplay music video for "Life in Technicolor II", to name but a few.

Although it gave its name to the Aldenham Bus Works owned by London Transport, Aldenham Works was actually located at nearby Elstree.

== Hamlets ==
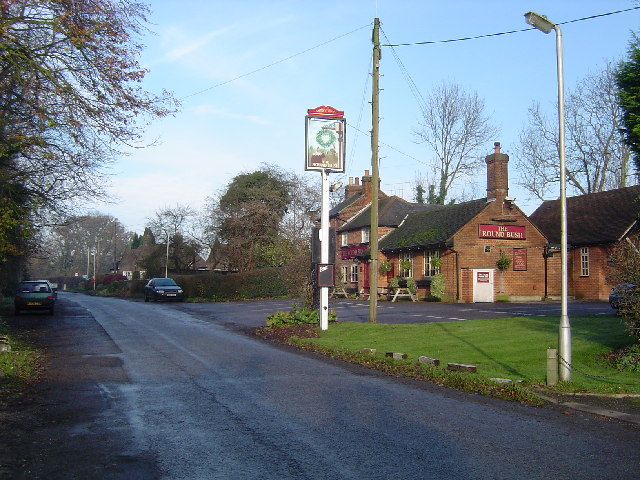
Round Bush

=== Round Bush ===
Round Bush is also on the B462 road, and lies immediately to the east, less than 300 metres (980 ft) away. Its population size and number of buildings make it a smaller settlement. However, Round Bush has one pub. A more average (smaller) size hamlet, the centre with the vast majority of the homes (due to surrounding cultivated larger sized farms) is where three roads meet at a public house.

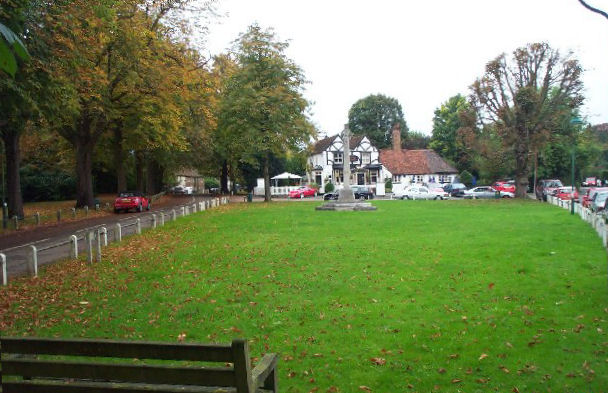
Letchmore Heath green

=== Letchmore Heath ===
This is the largest hamlet, and is 0.8 miles (1.3 km) southeast, it is slightly larger in population size than the village itself, see Letchmore Heath.

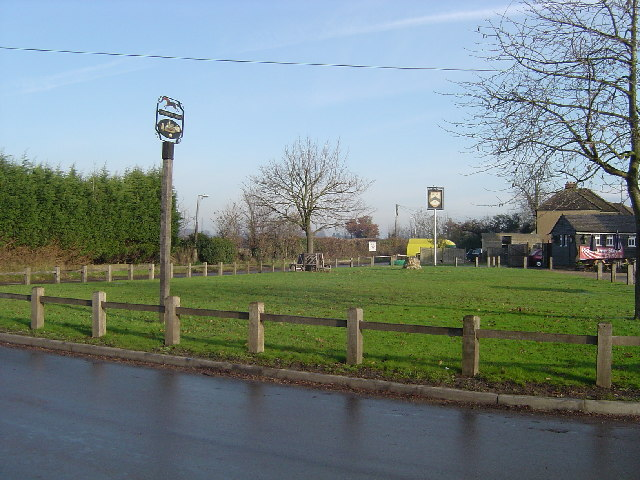
Patchetts Green

=== Patchetts Green ===
On Hilfield Lane, Patchetts Green is a hamlet of several historic houses, including the Three Compasses public house, Little Patchetts Green Farm and Patchetts Farm.

The other listed buildings here are: Delrow Cottage, Delrow Almshouses and Garden Cottage

Crossways Cottage is just northeast of the Infant School and almshouses and is opposite the junction of the lane leading to Letchmore Heath.

== Other landmarks ==
Close to the church stand a number of buildings of historical interest. The earliest of these is Aldenham Social Club – a late medieval hall house dating from around 1500. To the west of the churchyard stands Church Farm House (16th – 18th century) and to the east the old vicarage (now two dwellings), a fine example of early 18th century red brick architecture.

The parish of Aldenham also has three public schools: Aldenham School, Haberdashers' Boys' School and Haberdashers' Girls' School.

Wall Hall is a magnificent gothic revival mansion with a castellated façade created in the early nineteenth century.

== Sporting and leisure amenities ==
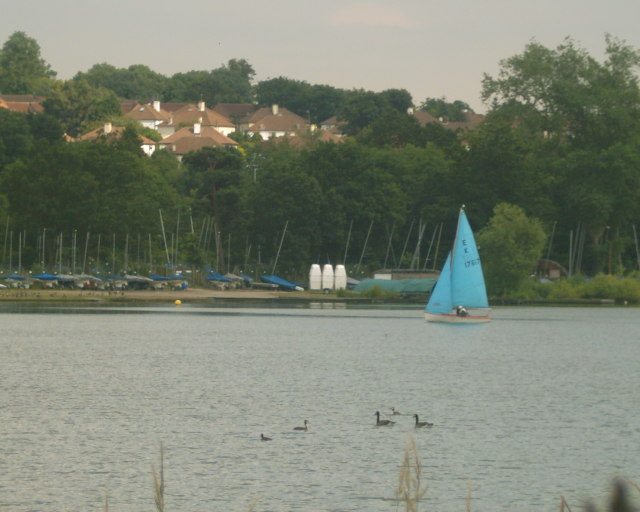
Aldenham Country Park between Aldenham and Elstree

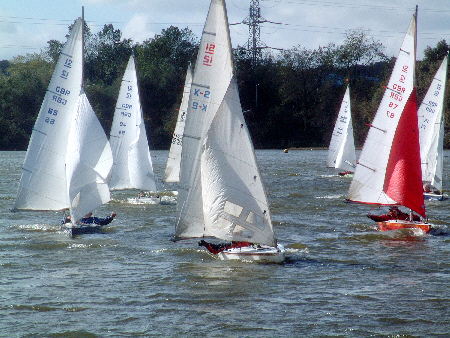
Aldenham Reservoir during competitive outings of mini-keelboats

The golf and country park is central to the village in Church Lane. Aldenham Country Park is council-owned land, which is some distance away from the old village, closer to the two southern hamlets; it has a 60 acres (24 ha) lake, Hillfield Reservoir, and is south of Letchmore Heath.

Directly south of the country park is Aldenham Sailing Club which uses Aldenham Reservoir, a 50 acres (20 ha) lake next to Elstree.

Aldenham Cricket Club (ACC) was founded in 1972. Aldenham has been playing cricket for over 40 years in the Parish. Hosted by the Aldenham Social Club, Aldenham Cricket Club has won the Watford Observer Plate on two occasions, the Hertfordshire Village Trophy, and won the league in the last two years.

== Notable people ==
- Richard Platt (died 1600), brewer, founder of Aldenham School
- Sir Adolphus Dalrymple (1784–1866), soldier and politician, lived at Delrow House, Aldenham.

== Hertsmere Meriden ==
On 1 April 2023 a small area that had been the western tip of Aldenham parish was made a separate civil parish called Hertsmere Meriden. This area forms part of the built-up area of Watford and is separated from the rest of Aldenham parish by the M1 motorway. The new parish has no parish council. It was created as a temporary measure to stop residents there having to pay Aldenham's parish precept for services they were unlikely to use, while Hertsmere and Watford councils petition for the area to be formally transferred into Watford borough.
