= Ramesh Kallidai =

Ramesh Kallidai is the former Secretary General of the Hindu Forum of Britain which is the largest umbrella body representing British Hindus. Kallidai was the first Secretary General of the organisation. He has also served as a Commissioner of Integration and Cohesion to the British Government, appointed by the Secretary of State for Communities and Local Government. In 2007, the Evening Standard reported that the then-secretary general of the HFB, Ramesh Kallidai, maintained a close association with Hindu nationalist organisations in India, including the Vishwa Hindu Parishad (VHP). Kallidai had spoken at a conference of the Rashtriya Swayamsevak Sangh earlier in 2007, praising its founder M. S. Golwalkar, and in 2004 had defended the VHP in British parliament, describing it as a peaceful organisation.
