= Skanda Vale =

Hindu site in Carmarthenshire, Wales

Coordinates: 51.965°N 4.302°W

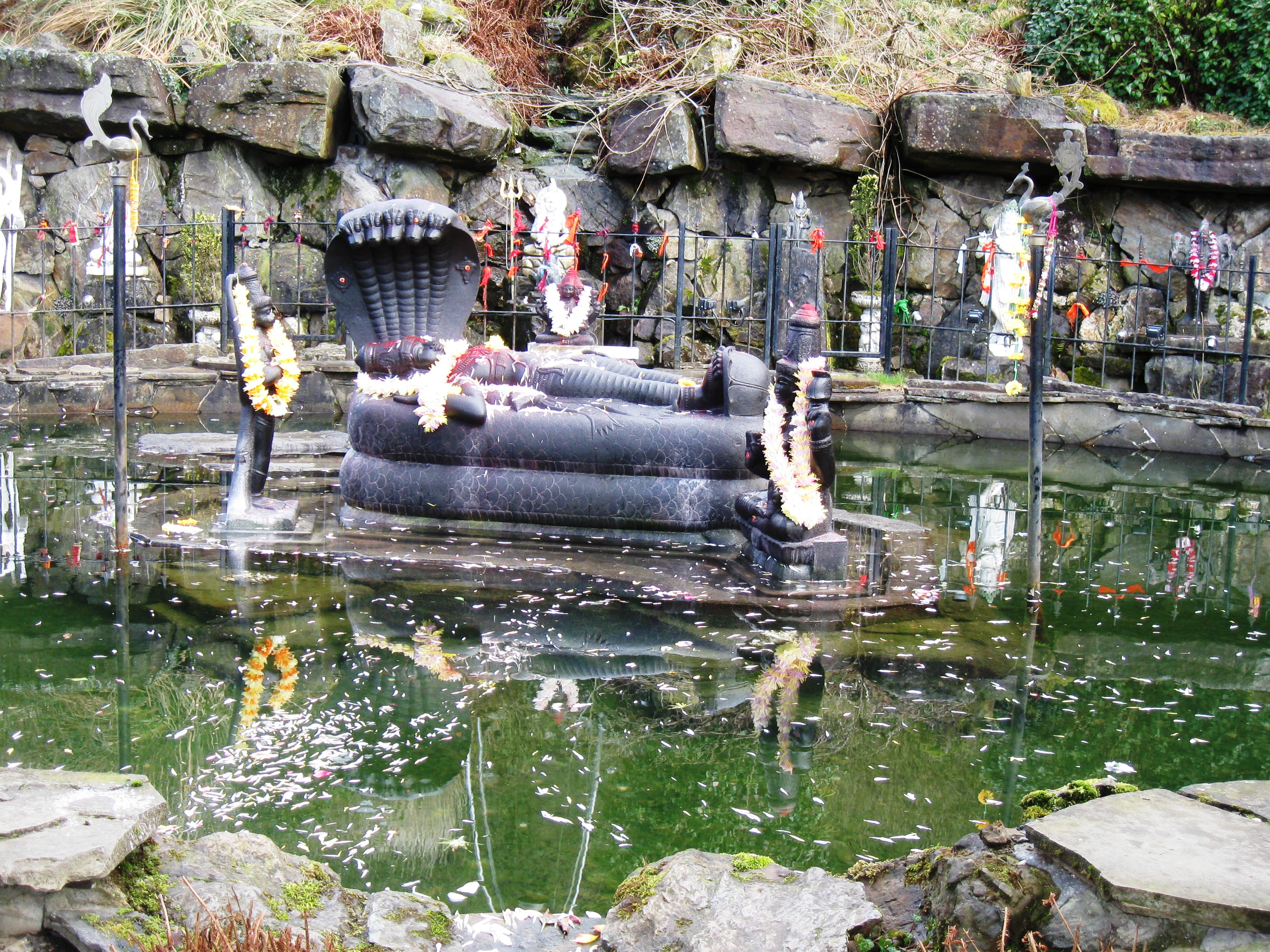
- The Sri Ranganatha Temple at Skanda Vale

Religion
- Affiliation: Hinduism
- Deity: Murugan, Shiva, Kali, Vishnu, Jesus Christ, Buddha, Sai baba of Shirdi

Location
- Location: Llanpumsaint, Carmarthenshire
- State: Wales
- Country: United Kingdom
- Interactive map of Skanda Vale

Architecture
- Creator: Guru Sri Subramanium
- Established: 1973

Website
- https://www.skandavale.org/

Skanda Vale is a non-denominational spiritual centre and monastery located in Carmarthenshire, Wales, near the village of Llanpumsaint. Founded in 1973 by Guru Sri Subramanium, the monastery is inhabited and run by the Community of the Many Names of God, which also runs Somaskanda Ashram in Switzerland. Skanda Vale promotes a practical spirituality centred on devotion and selfless service.

Skanda Vale is a syncretic religious community, albeit one that is seen from the outside as being a Hindu ashram. The monastics take Franciscan Christian vows of poverty, obedience and chastity and wear Christian monk-style robes. The ethos is based on Krishna's teachings from the Bhagavad Gita and sanatana dharma. The main shrines are to Hindu deities, and the pujas are clearly Hindu, however most monks and nuns are from western backgrounds. The temples are a place of pilgrimage for Hindus from Tamil and South Indian backgrounds who worship Murugan. Gujuratis and Bengalis visit the temples of Vishnu and Shakti.

Skanda Vale is a registered charity in the UK and is funded entirely by donations. It is closely associated with the legally separate charity that sustains Skanda Vale Hospice.

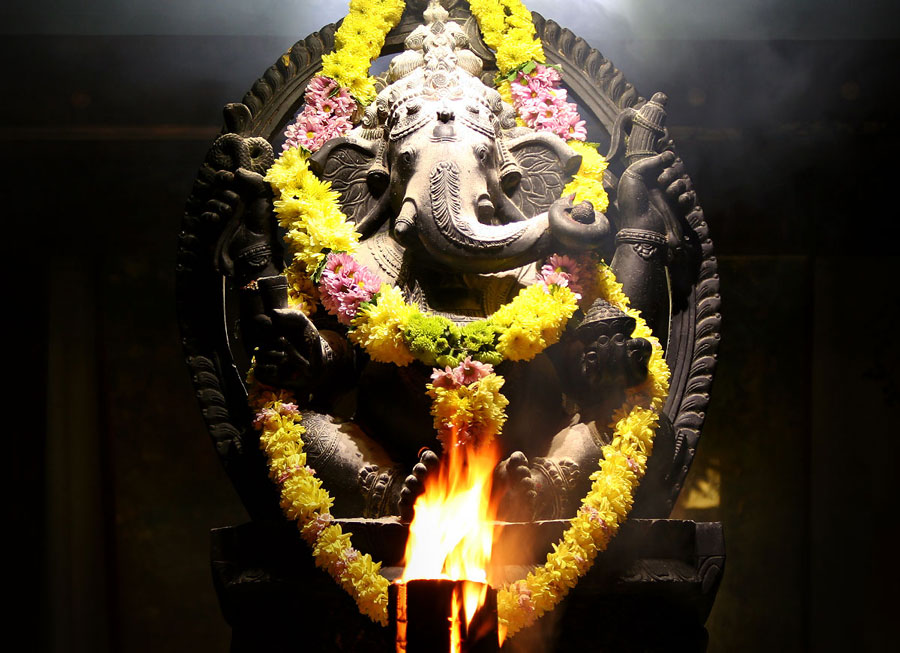
Statue of Ganesha at Skanda Vale Ashram, Wales

== History ==
Skanda Vale was founded in 1973 by Guru Sri Subramanium, who had previously been living and working in London while giving support and instruction to spiritual seekers of various backgrounds. The original property was previously a smallholding of 22 acres.

The original farmhouse was converted into the Subramanium Temple, dedicated primarily to Murugan (Skanda being one of Murugan's names), but also accommodating the veneration of other divinities such as Shiva, Kali, Vishnu, Jesus Christ and the Buddha. The monastic community known as the Community of the Many Names of God was established in Skanda Vale, and the ashram grew in area and population over the years. A second temple, the Maha Shakti temple, was established in 1991. This temple is dedicated to the goddess Kali.

In 1993 Skanda Vale Hospice was set up by members of the Community of the Many Names of God. This hospice conducts palliative care for the terminally ill, in line with Skanda Vale's emphasis on the sanctity of life.

A third temple, the Sri Ranganatha Temple, was inaugurated in 1999. The founder of Skanda Vale, Guru Sri Subramanium, died in 2007.

Immediately following the death of its founder, Skanda Vale became embroiled in controversy regarding Shambo, a bull living in the care of the community. Shambo was tested positive for bovine tuberculosis. As a result, the Welsh government ordered him killed. The Community at Skanda Vale resisted this order, expressing their belief in the sanctity of life. The campaign to save Shambo and associated court battles reached international news, and drew involvement from the Hindu community in the UK and internationally. Shambo was ultimately confirmed killed on 27 July 2007.

Somaskanda Ashram in Switzerland was established in 2016 as a second ashram of the Community of the Many Names of God. The property had first been purchased by Swiss devotees in 1994, and was finally inaugurated as a fully-fledged temple in October 2016.

In the present day, Skanda Vale continues to operate as a spiritual centre and place of pilgrimage for people of a wide variety of backgrounds, as well as acting as an animal sanctuary, a centre for food aid distribution and as support for Skanda Vale Hospice.

== Ethos ==
Skanda Vale teaches and practices a practical spirituality suited to the varying inclinations of individual seekers, with an especial focus on devotion and selfless service, or bhakti yoga and karma yoga respectively, and integration with the Divine through direct experience in the course of daily living. As part of this practice, Skanda Vale upholds a belief in the sanctity of all life, based on an understanding of all life as expressions of universal Divinity.

The community's founder taught that all life emerged from an underlying non-dual timeless consciousness, broadly in line with the teachings of Advaita Vedanta. While based in this understanding, Skanda Vale celebrates a broad diversity of spiritual paths and approaches. The organisation adopts a liberal perennialist approach to the wide variety of spiritual inclinations and needs of individual seekers.

== Activities ==
The ashram has three temples - the Subramanium Temple, Maha Shakti Temple and Sri Ranganatha Temple. There is a regular routine of six daily pujas spread across these three temples, punctuated by extended pujas on special occasions. Worship in these temples is led by members of the resident Community of the Many Names of God, but is open to participation by all visitors. All activity at Skanda Vale is funded entirely by anonymous donations, in line with the Community's policy of non-commercialism.

Skanda Vale reports receiving over 90,000 pilgrims a year. All of these pilgrims are given free meals, and many are accommodated in the ashram's accommodation. Skanda Vale provides emotional and spiritual support for visitors and devotees, and also holds spiritual seminars in London and in its child ashram in Switzerland.

Much of Skanda Vale's activity also relates to its belief in the sanctity of life. Based on this ethos, Skanda Vale supports Skanda Vale Hospice, and also operates an animal sanctuary on its land. Animals cared for at Skanda Vale include cattle, buffalo, horses, chickens and other birds and a pair of Asian elephants. Valli, Skanda Vale's original temple elephant, was given to the ashram's founder by Sri Lankan President Jayawardene, having previously been in an elephant orphanage.

== The Community of the Many Names of God ==
The resident community at Skanda Vale and Somaskanda Ashram is known as the Community of the Many Names of God. The community is made up of about 25 monks and nuns and a small number of lay members.

All monastics take vows modelled on the Franciscan monastic vows of poverty, chastity and obedience, and wear a robe modelled on the Franciscan habit. The Community of the Many Names of God maintains a special relationship with Saint Francis of Assisi, holding a special service on his feast day every year.

== See also ==
- Hinduism in the United Kingdom
- Hinduism in Wales
