= Ganesha (disambiguation) =

Ganesha is a Hindu deity of intellect and wisdom.

Ganesha, Ganesh, or Gaṇeśa may also refer to:

== People ==
- Ganesh (name), a list of people with the given name and surname
- Raja Ganesha (1415), a ruler of Bengal who overthrew the Ilyas dynasty
- Gaṇeśa Daivajna, 16th century astronomer
- Shankar–Ganesh, an Indian music director duo who worked in Tamil, Telugu, and Kannada movies
- Ganesh, one half of the Indian musical duo Ganesh and Kumaresh
- Ganesh (actor), Indian actor in Kannada cinema
- Ganesh (lawyer), fictional Indian lawyer

== In the arts ==
- Ganesh (album), a 1997 album by Aka Moon
- Ganesh (1998 film), a 1998 Indian Telugu-language film
- Ganesh (2009 film), a 2009 Indian Telugu-language film
- Ganesha, an Indian Kannada-language film series, including
  - Ganeshana Maduve(1990)
  - Gauri Ganesha (1991)
  - Ganesha Subramanya (1992)
  - Ganeshana Galate (1995)
  - Ganesha I Love You (1997)
  - Ganesha Matthe Banda (2008)

== In geography ==
- Ganesh Himal, a mountain range in Asia
- Ganesa Macula, a dark feature on Saturn's moon Titan
- Ganish, a village in Hunza valley of Pakistan

== Other uses ==
- Ganesha Operation, an educational institution in Indonesia that focuses on providing tutoring services
- Ganesa (gastropod), a genus of marine snails in the family Turbinidae
- Ganesha (ctenophore), a genus of comb jellies
- Ganesha (psychedelic), 2,5-dimethoxy-3,4-dimethylamphetamine, a hallucinogenic drug
- Ganesha the Elephant, a fictional character from the Bloody Roar series
- Khairatabad Ganesh, an idol of Ganesh in Hyderabad, India

== See also ==
- Ganesa (disambiguation)
- Ganes (disambiguation)
- Ganapati (disambiguation)
- Vinayaka (disambiguation), another name of the deity
- Ganesan, an Indian surname
- Bal Ganesh, a 2007 Indian animated film series and subsequent film series about the deity
- My Friend Ganesha, a 2007 Indian film and subsequent film series about the deity
