= Ganes =

Ganes may refer to:

- Ganesha (or Ganes or Ganesa), a Hindu deity
- Ganes (band), North Italian pop trio singing in the minority Ladin language
- Ganes (film), 2007 biopic about the Finnish rock band Hurriganes
- Ganes, a creek in Ophir, Alaska

== See also ==
- Ganesa (disambiguation)
- Ganesha (disambiguation)
- Ganesan, an Indian surname
