= Religion in Houston =

Overview of religion in Houston

Religious affiliation (2020)
Christian	72%
Protestant	40%
Catholic	29%
Other Christian	3%
Unaffiliated	21%
Muslim	2%
Jewish	1%
Buddhist	1%
Hindu	0.5%
Other faiths	1.5%

Throughout its history the city of Houston, Texas has been religiously influenced by Protestant Christianity in the Bible Belt. Since the latter half of the 20th century, the Houston area has become home to many different religions in part to its large ethnic diversity, immigration, and refugee resettlement.

According to a 2014 study by the Pew Research Center, 73% of Houstonians identified themselves as Christians, with 50% professing attendance at a variety of churches that could be considered Protestant, and 19% professing Roman Catholic Christian beliefs while 20% claimed no religious affiliation. The same study revealed that other religions (including Judaism, Buddhism, Islam, and Hinduism) collectively made up about 7% of the population.

As of 2016, 46% of the Houston-area population was Protestant, 31% was Catholic, 5% was of other religions, and 18% was of no religion; in a separate 2020 study by the Public Religion Research Institute, 72% of the population were Christian, and 40% were Protestant while 29% were Catholic. Its unaffiliated population in 2020 was 21%, and Muslims and Jews were the second and third-largest non-Christian religions in the area.

== Christianity ==
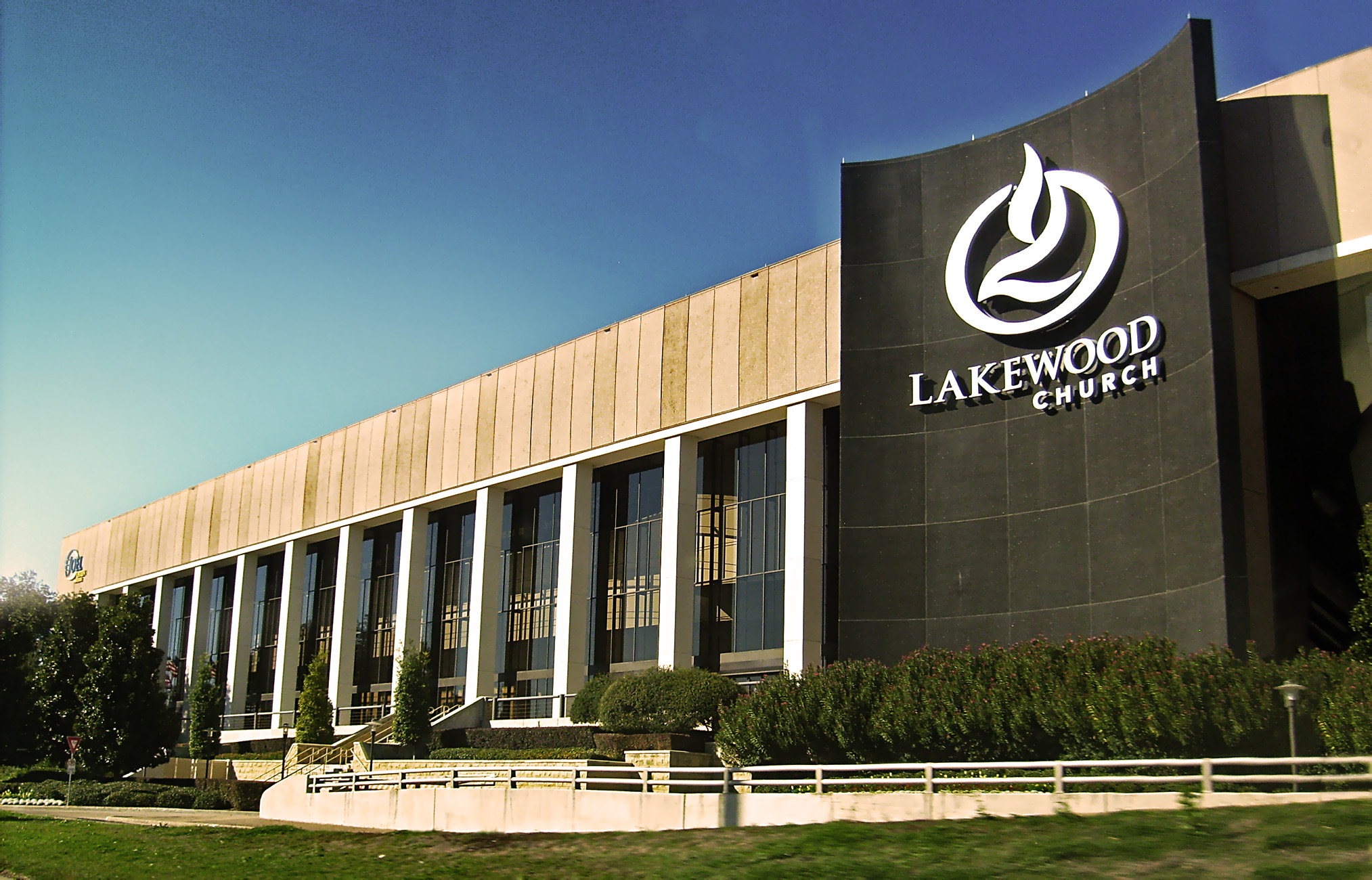
Lakewood Church

Christianity in Houston arrived with its settlement. Since then, Christianity has remained the most prevalently practiced religion for Houston and its metropolitan area. In 2012, Kate Shellnut of the Houston Chronicle described Houston as a "heavily Christian city." According to the Pew Research Center and D Magazine, Houston is the third-most religious and Christian area by percentage of population in the United States, and second in Texas behind the Dallas–Fort Worth metroplex. The metropolitan area of Houston's Christian community is dominated by Protestantism and Roman Catholicism.

In 2020, the Association of Religion Data Archives determined that the Catholic Church numbered some 1,299,901 individuals for the metropolitan area; the second-largest single Christian denomination (Southern Baptists) numbered 800,688; following, non-denominational Protestant churches represented the third-largest Christian cohort at 666,548. Altogether, however, Baptists of the Southern Baptist Convention, the American Baptist Association, American Baptist Churches USA, Full Gospel Baptist Church Fellowship, National Baptist Convention USA and National Baptist Convention of America, and the National Missionary Baptist Convention numbered 926,554. Non-denominational Protestants, the Disciples of Christ, Christian Churches and Churches of Christ, and the Churches of Christ numbered 723,603 altogether according to this study.

Lakewood Church in Houston, led by Pastor Joel Osteen, is the largest church in the United States. A megachurch, it had 44,800 weekly attendees in 2010, up from 11,000 weekly in 2000. Since 2005, it has occupied the former Compaq Center sports stadium. In September 2010, Outreach magazine published a list of the 100 largest Christian churches in the United States, and on the list were the following Houston-area churches: Lakewood, Second Baptist Church Houston, Woodlands Church, Church Without Walls, and First Baptist Church. According to the list, Houston and Dallas were tied as the second-most popular city for megachurches in 2011.

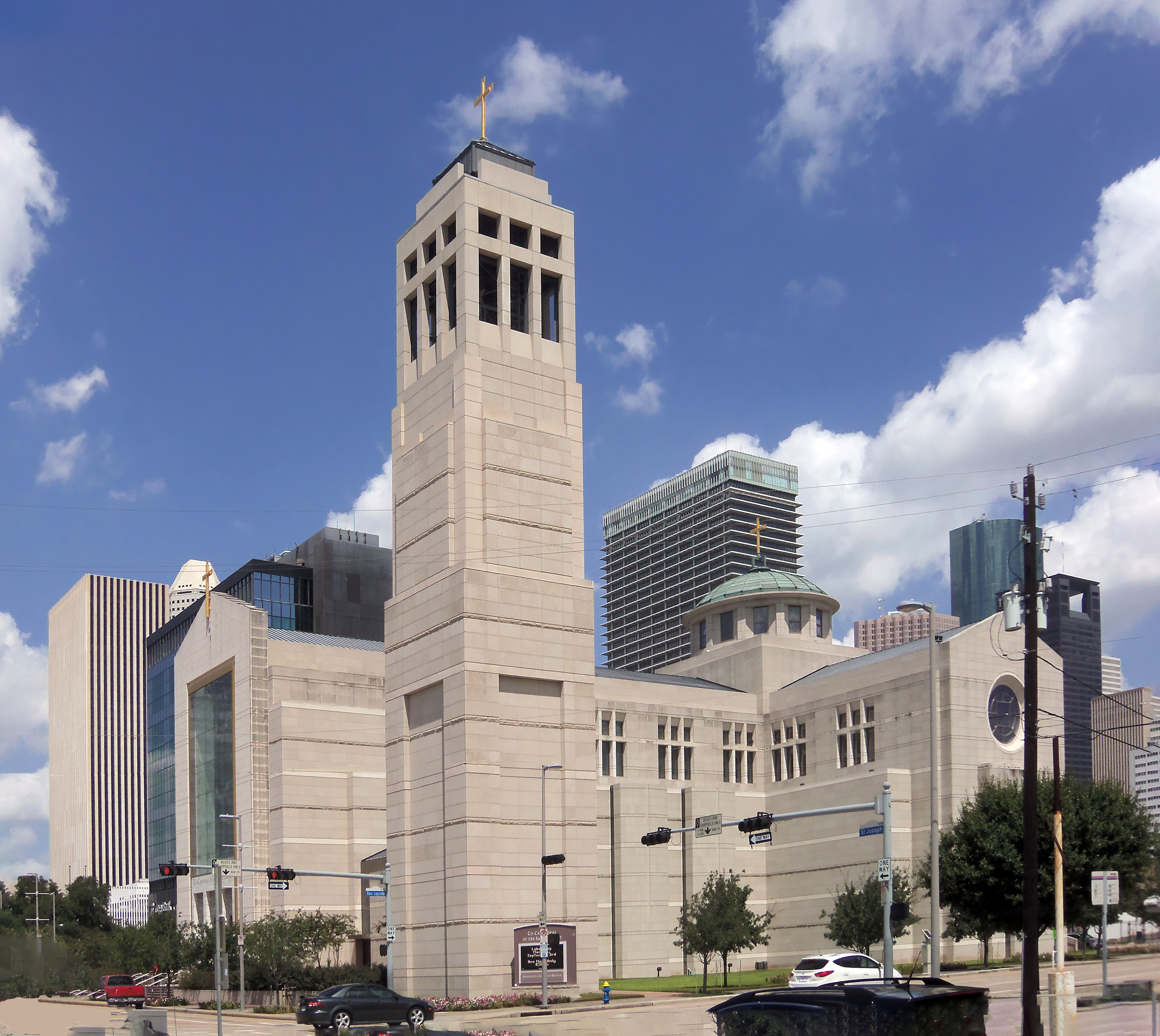
Sacred Heart Co-Cathedral in Downtown Houston

The Roman Catholic Archdiocese of Galveston–Houston, the largest Catholic jurisdiction in Texas and fifth-largest in the United States, was established in 1847. The Roman Catholic Archdiocese of Galveston–Houston claimed approximately 1.7 million Catholics within its boundaries as of 2019. Its co-cathedral is located within the Houston city limits, while the diocesan is in Galveston. Other prominent Catholic jurisdictions include the Eastern Catholic Ruthenian Greek Catholic Church and Ukrainian Greek Catholic Church as well as the Personal Ordinariate of the Chair of Saint Peter, whose cathedral is also in Houston. A relatively small Maronite Catholic community exists in the area with about 500 families as of 2008.

A variety of Eastern and Oriental Orthodox churches can be found in Houston. Immigrants from Eastern Europe, the Middle East, Ethiopia, India, and other areas have added to Houston's Eastern and Oriental Orthodox population. As of 2011 in the entire state, 32,000 people actively attended Orthodox churches. In 2013, Father John Whiteford, the pastor of St. Jonah Orthodox Church near Spring, stated that there were about 6,000-9,000 Eastern Orthodox Christians in Houston. The Association of Religion Data Archives numbered 16,526 Eastern and Oriental Orthodox Houstonians in 2020. The most prominent Eastern and Oriental Orthodox jurisdictions are the Greek Orthodox Archdiocese of America, the Antiochian Orthodox Archdiocese of North America, the Coptic Orthodox Church of Alexandria, the Ethiopian Orthodox Tewahedo Church, and the Armenian Apostolic Church.

Among its Eastern Orthodox community, the Greek Orthodox constitute a substantial portion and originated the annual Greek Festival. The Eastern Orthodox community, similar to Protestant and Catholic communities, operates their own private school.

Within the Coptic Orthodox community, churches are part of the Coptic Orthodox Diocese of the Southern United States. In 2004, there were three Coptic Orthodox churches in Houston: St. Mark Coptic Orthodox Church in Bellaire, the St. Mary and Archangel Michael Church in northwest Harris County, and the Archangel Raphael Coptic Orthodox Church in Clear Lake City. The St. Mary and Archangel Michael church began church services on July 25, 2004, had 200 families in August of that year, and was built at a cost of $2.5 million. The St. Mary and Archangel Michael church is the largest Copt church in the Houston area.

In the late 1960s, there were far fewer Coptic families, and they were served by a priest from Los Angeles, who would fly monthly to Houston and hold mass in a borrowed Orthodox church or in a private house. From 1968 to 2006, more than 600 Coptic families moved to Houston. Due to sectarian strife against Copts in Egypt, by 2006, the number of immigrants had increased and membership of Copt churches in Houston was growing. In 2006, Gregory Katz of the Houston Chronicle said that, partly because many Copt church leaders are accustomed to anti-Copt attitudes in Egypt, those who come to Houston are not accustomed to speaking freely about their religious beliefs. They "do not mingle easily with the rest of the large Christian community in the Houston area". After the 2011 Alexandria bombing in Egypt, Houston Coptic churches cancelled their Coptic Christmas services.

As of 2011, there were 58,200 members of the Church of Jesus Christ of Latter-Day Saints (LDS Church) in Houston, with more than 1,000 new members joining per year. The LDS Church has over 32 Spanish-speaking congregations in Houston.

== Judaism ==
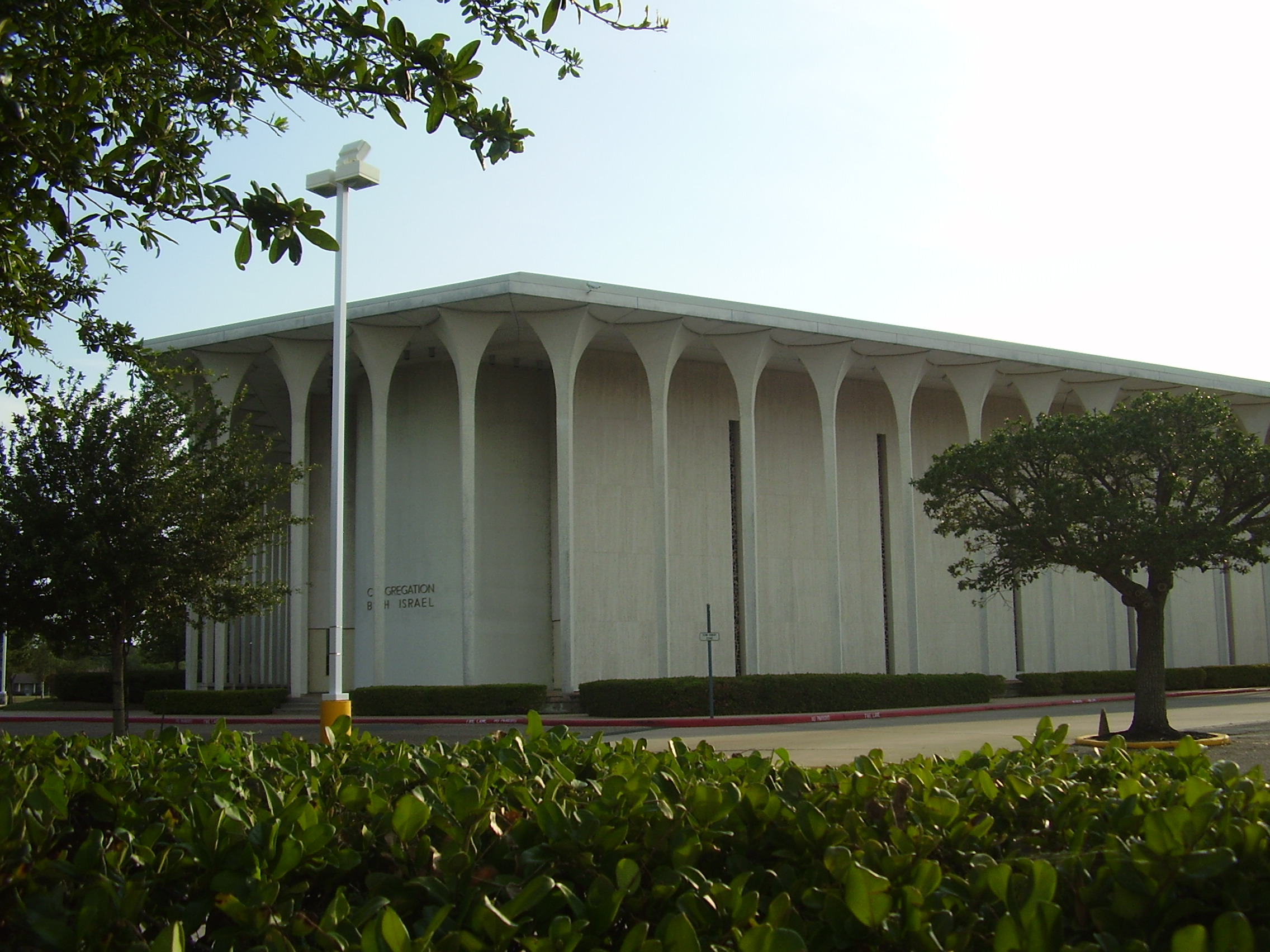
The current Congregation Beth Israel

The first synagogue to open in Houston was the Orthodox Beth Israel Congregation, now the Congregation Beth Israel, which opened in 1854. As of around 1987, about 42,000 Jews lived in Greater Houston. In 2008, Irving N. Rothman, author of The Barber in Modern Jewish Culture: A Genre of People, Places, and Things, with Illustrations, wrote that Houston "has a scattered Jewish populace and not a large enough population of Jews to dominate any single neighborhood" and that the city's "hub of Jewish life" is the Meyerland community.

According to a study in 2016 by Berman Jewish DataBank, 51,000 Jews lived in the area, an increase of 4,000 since 2001. By 2016, there were over 40 synagogues in the Houston area. The Association of Religion Data Archives 2020 study determined there were 7,061 Conservative Jews and 3,050 Orthodox Jews; there were 11,481 Reform Jews throughout the area.

== Islam ==
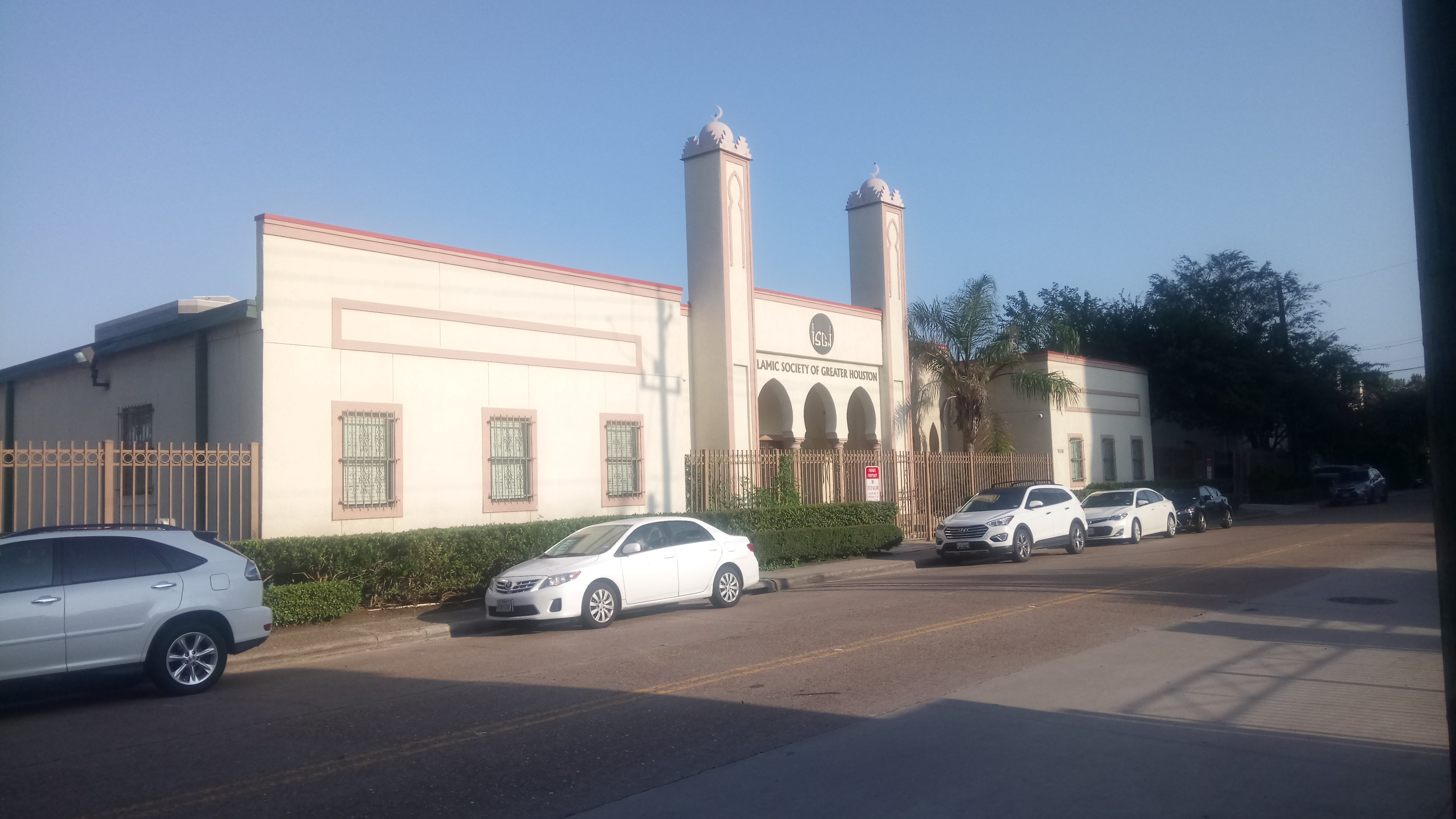
Islamic Society of Greater Houston headquarters

Houston has the largest Muslim community in Texas and the Southern United States, as of 2012. It is estimated that Muslims made up 1.2% of Houston's population. As of 2016, Muslims in the Houston area included South Asians, Middle Easterners, Africans, Turks, and Indonesians, as well as a growing population of Latino Muslim converts. In 2000 there were over 41 mosques and storefront religious centers, with the largest being the Al-Noor Mosque (Mosque of Light) of the Islamic Society of Greater Houston. In 2020, there were an estimated 123,256 Muslims.

Among the largest branches of Islam, in 2007, Barbara Karkabi of the Houston Chronicle wrote that the Sunni and Shia Muslims "generally enjoy good relations in Houston." The University of Houston has separate student organizations for Sunni Muslims and Shia Muslims, the mostly-Sunni Muslim Students Association and the Shia Association of Muslim Students. In contrast with most Muslim communities, the Houston area has a notable LGBT Muslim base, and announced the establishment of an affirming mosque in 2022.

== Buddhism ==
In the late 1970s, Buddhists began establishing themselves in Houston. Even though the first wave of Vietnamese immigrants to Houston, occurring after the end of the Vietnam War, was mostly Roman Catholic, subsequent waves of Vietnamese immigrants were mostly Buddhist.

The Texas Buddhist Association (TBA) in Houston was founded in 1978 by Reverend Jan Hai. In order to allow westerners to come to Buddhism in a context they could understand, Hai adopted a congregational form similar to that of a Christian church. The American Bodhi Center, a 515-acre (208 ha) property located in unincorporated Waller County, near Hempstead, is a part of the TBA. It includes log houses, dormitories, and a meditation hall. In 2009 Zen T. C. Zheng of the Houston Chronicle stated that it is one of the United States's largest Buddhist developments.

The Buddha Light Temple opened in 1984, making it one of the first Buddhist places of worship. Fo Guang Shan Chung Mei Temple (佛光山中美寺; Fó Guāng Shān Zhōng Měi Sì) is a Buddhist Temple located in Stafford, Texas. Dawn Mountain Tibetan Temple, a Tibetan Buddhist temple and community center, is located in Montrose. A husband and wife, Rice University religious studies professor Anne Klein and therapist Harvey Aronson, started the temple in 1996.

The Houston Zen Center practices Sōtō Zen Buddhism. The Myoken-Ji Temple, a Nichiren Buddhist temple, is located in proximity to the University of Houston. As of 2011, it is led by Rev. Myokei Caine-Barrett, who was born in Kawasaki, Japan, in Greater Tokyo. In 2020, Kadampa Meditation Center Houston opened up a space in Montrose for the study and practice of meditation and modern Buddhism. The community is part of the New Kadampa Tradition. Also, in 2020, the Association of Religion Data Archives stated there were 20,281 Buddhists in the area.

By 2023, Houston Buddhist Vihara became the gathering hub of Houston's Sri Lankan community.

== Taoism ==
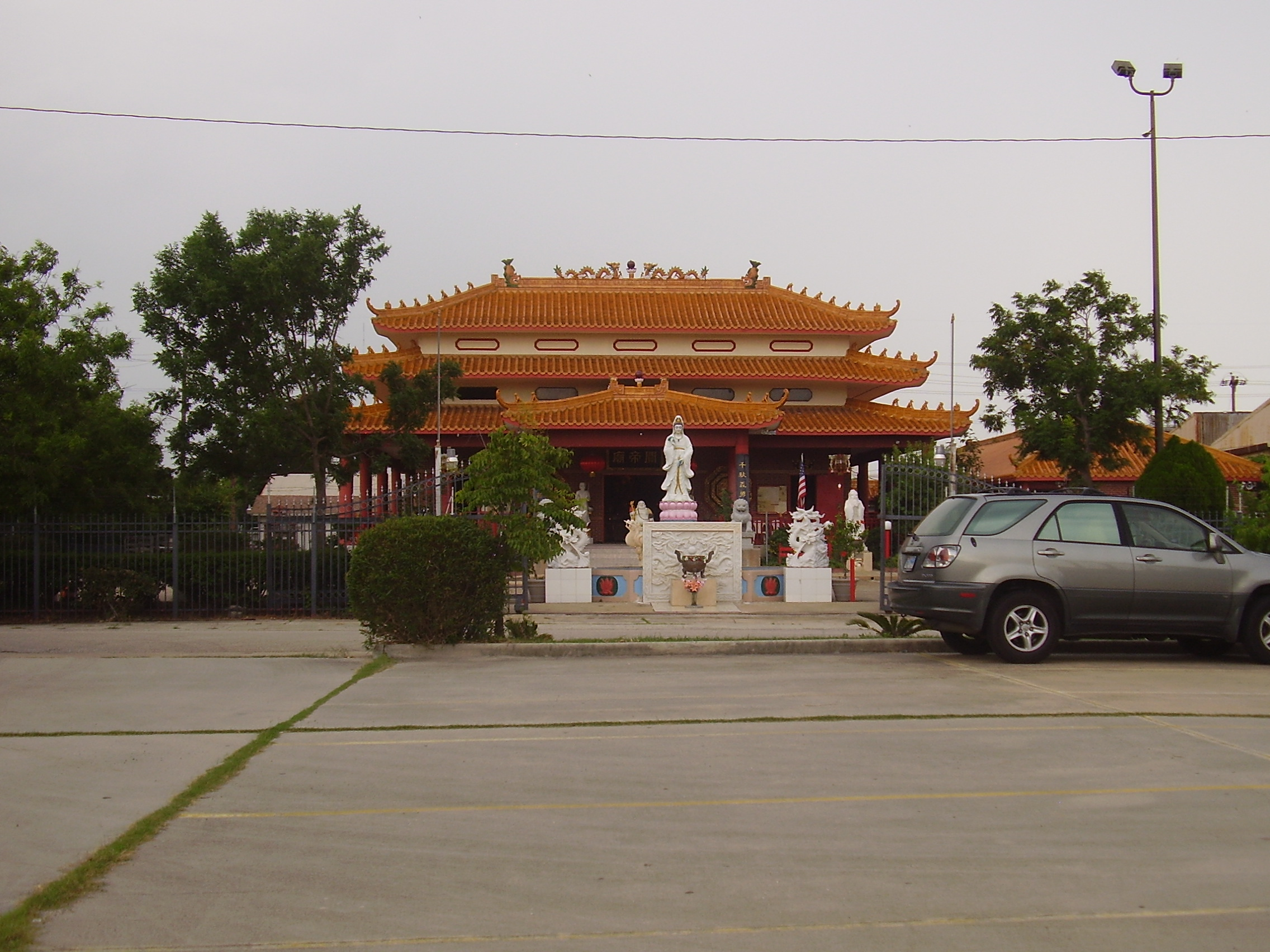
Texas Guandi Temple

A Taoist temple, Texas Guandi Temple (traditional Chinese: 德州關帝廟; simplified Chinese: 德州关帝庙; pinyin: Dézhōu Guāndì Miào) is located in East Downtown. The temple was established in 1999 by a Vietnamese couple, Charles Loi Ngo and Carolyn, the former originating from China. They decided to build a temple to Guan Yu (Guandi) after surviving an aggravated robbery which occurred at their store in the Fifth Ward. They believed that Guandi saved their lives during the incident.

A Vietnamese refugee named Charles Lee coordinated the donations and funding so the temple could be built; Lee stated his motivation was to thank the United States for welcoming him and saving his life when he arrived in 1978. The construction materials and architectural design originated from China. A representation of Buddha and a golden Lord Brahma originated from Thailand. The temple is open to followers of all religions, and it has perfumed halls. Ming Shui Huang was appointed volunteer manager in 2000.

== Hinduism ==
In 1969, the first Hindu institution, ISKCON Houston of the Hare Krishnas, opened, and in the following decade there was an increase in Hindus. As of 2016, according to the spokesperson of the Hindus of Greater Houston, Vijay Pallod, there were about 120,000 Hindus in the Houston area. In a separate 2020 study, the Association of Religion Data Archives estimated some 51,567 Hindus and Yoga practitioners.

In 2018, there were around 480 Hindu families in The Woodlands. In a 15 year period ending in 2011 the Hindu population in the Woodlands increased by 300%, and Kate Shellnut of the Houston Chronicle stated that according to "Hindu leaders" every year the Hindu population in The Woodlands grows by 20 to 25 families.

The original Hindu places of worship in the Houston area were private residences; at a later period dedicated buildings opened in the area.

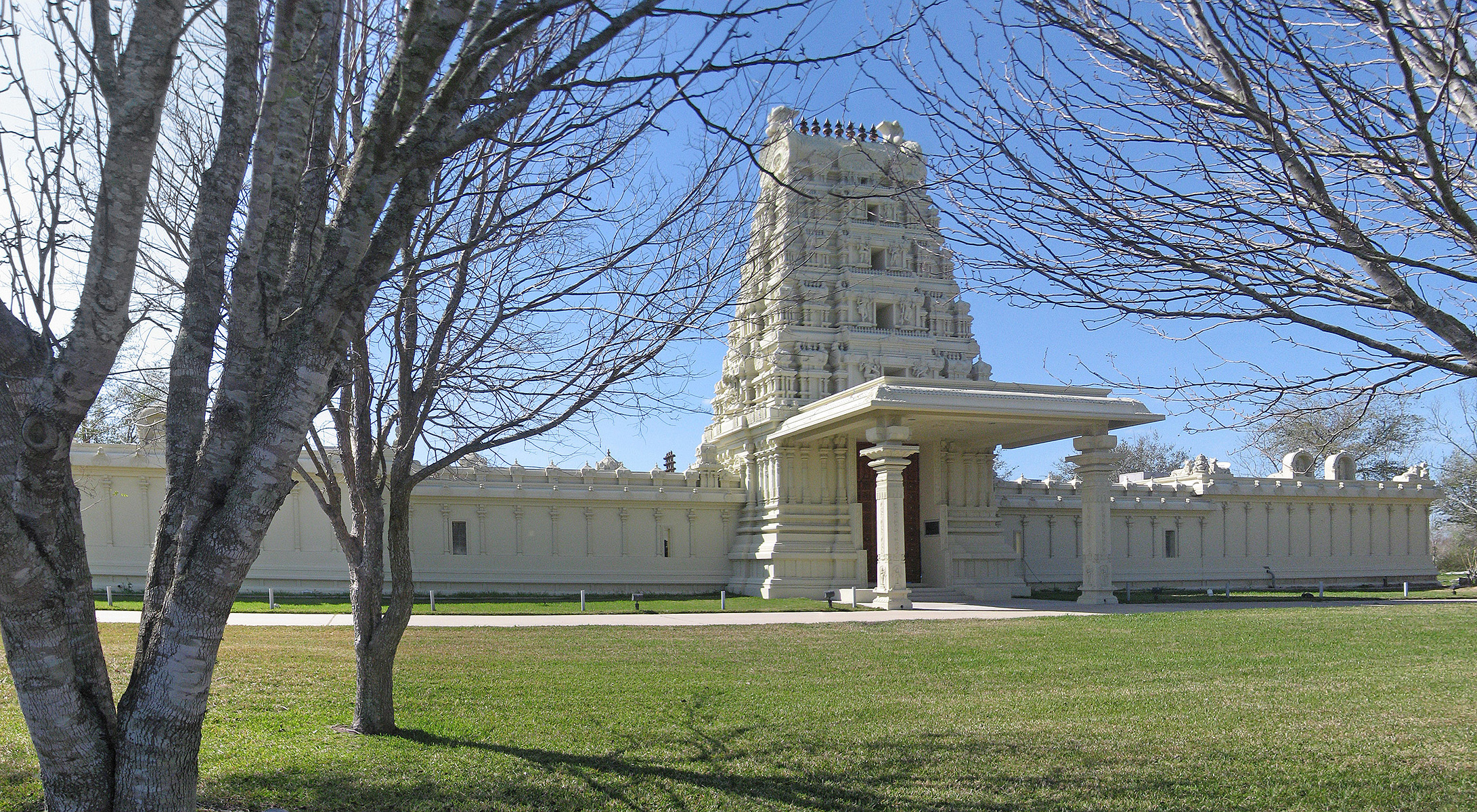
Sri Meenakshi Devasthanam Temple in unincorporated Brazoria County (near Pearland)

Sri Meenakshi Temple in unincorporated Brazoria County (near Pearland) had its property purchased in 1978 and was established in 1979. Pat Turner of the Houston Chronicle wrote that the initial facility "was barely big enough for one person to stand in while performing worship services (pooja)." New facilities were established circa 1995.

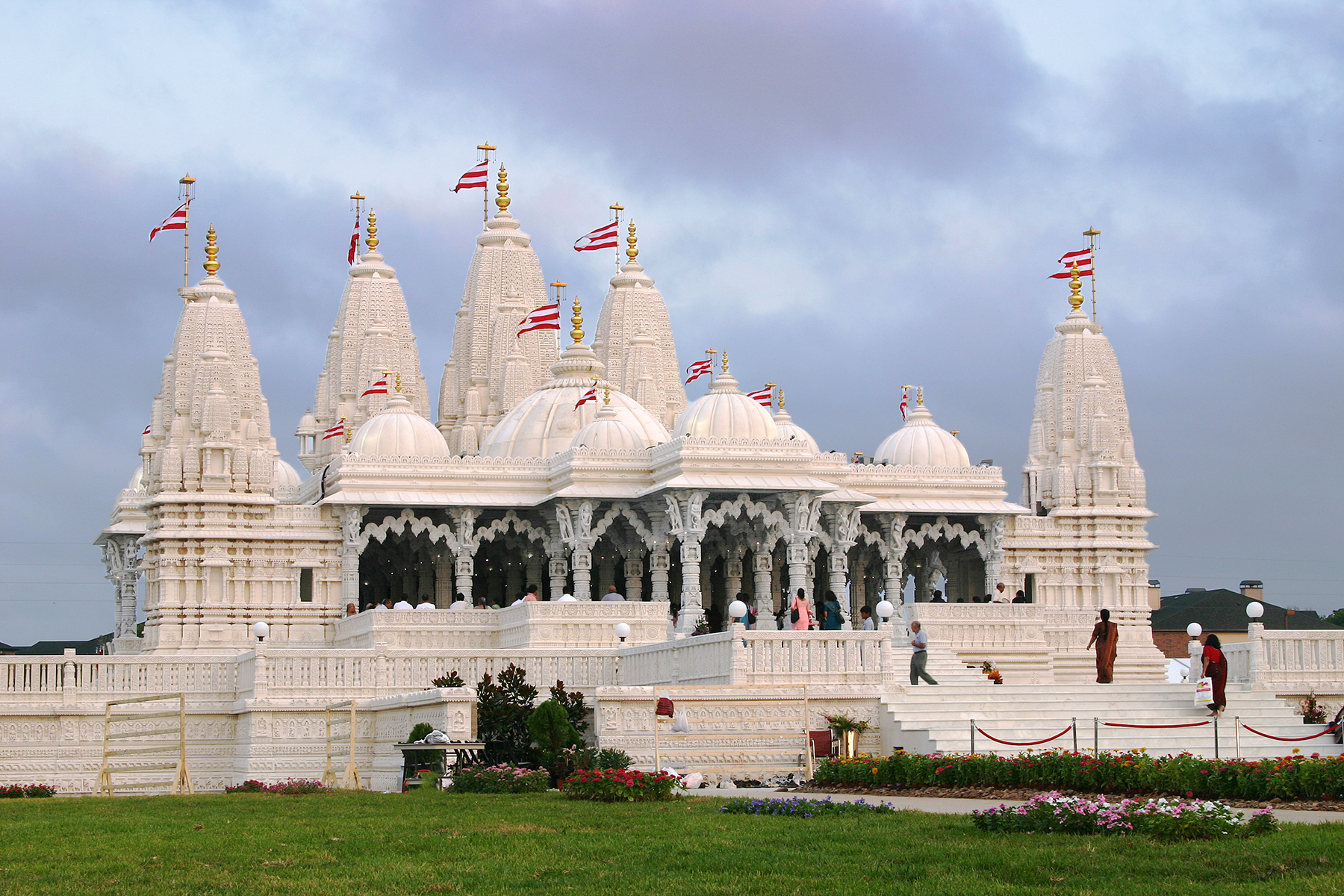
BAPS Shri Swaminarayan Mandir Houston in unincorporated Fort Bend County

The BAPS Shri Swaminarayan Mandir Houston, a Swaminarayan sect Hindu temple, is along Brand Lane in unincorporated Fort Bend County, near Stafford and Sugar Land. It consists of a 11,500-square-foot (1,070 m^{2}), 73-foot (22 m) tall open-air temple and a 25,620-square-foot (2,380 m^{2}) surrounding deck. By July 2004, the cost to build the temple was $7 million at that time. The temple materials were carved out of Italian marble and Turkish limestone by 3,000 craftsmen in various parts of India. The pieces were shipped to Houston, and construction began in March 2002. 175 volunteers, including some individuals resident in India, came to the Houston area to help build the temple. Most of the labor was donated. Up until the opening, some finishing touches to the structure were made.

The Sri Saumyakasi, a Sugar Land Chinmaya Hindu temple, opened in December 2007. It is the only Hindu temple in the city devoted to Shiva. The Chinmaya Mission Houston started in 1982. Originally classes were held in an apartment. In a ten year period the members raised $2.5 million for the permanent temple.

There is another Hindu temple with a Sugar Land postal address, Shri Krishna Vrundavana, physically in the Alief super neighborhood in the Houston city limits, which occupies the 450-person, 9,000-square-foot (840 m^{2}) former La Festa Hall. It was established in 2011 with about 200 people in its congregation; originally the temple rented its property. In October 2015, the temple organizers bought the current site for $1.3 million. In December 2015, its congregation had numbered over 800.

The Hindu Temple of The Woodlands, initially the sole Hindu temple serving the northern part of Greater Houston, was scheduled to open in 2011. The temple, built for $3 million, is located in a 10,000-square-foot (930 m^{2}) stone exterior building on an 8-acre (3.2 ha) plot of land along the Woodlands Parkway. It serves Hindus living in The Woodlands, Conroe, Spring, Tomball, and northern Harris County. The planning, fundraising, and construction took six years. Before the temple was built, residents of the service area of the temple had to travel about one and half hours per direction to temples in Pearland and Sugar Land. Another Hindu temple, Char Dham Hindu Temple at Northway Drive at Texas State Highway 242 in the Woodlands, was founded by Surya Sahoo. By 2012, its construction was upcoming. At that time some area residents had concerns about forest preservation, traffic, noise pollution, and lighting.

In 2010, Indo-Caribbeans Hindus finished constructing the Lakshmi Narayan Mandir of North Houston in Willowbrook, Houston. It is one of the many Hindu Temples in the world associated with the Green Kumbla, a Hindu Organization associated with establishing green practices in Hindu Temples. In 2014, the Hindu Temple planted trees on campus in celebration of Earth Day. In 2015, the temple became the first Hindu Temple in North America to create a rainwater harvesting system for its building.

In 2013, Sanatan Dharma Maha Sabha of Trinidad and Tobago, Branch 377, an organization of those who have Trinidad and Tobago ancestry, and the Hindu community of the Greater Katy area jointly began development of a new Hindu temple, which will include all Hindu deities rather than focusing on one deity. By November of that year, the 2.4-acre (0.97 ha) future site of the Sai Durga Shiva Vishnu Temple in unincorporated Fort Bend County already had its temporary buildings. The renovation was scheduled to begin in early 2014 with a goal of opening in May of that year. About 10-15 people are organizing the temple. Amaranth Venkateswarlu, an engineer who is one of the organizers, stated that there are about 500 Indian families who live in Greater Katy and that they currently go to Hindu temples in Pearland and Sugar Land.

== Sikhism ==
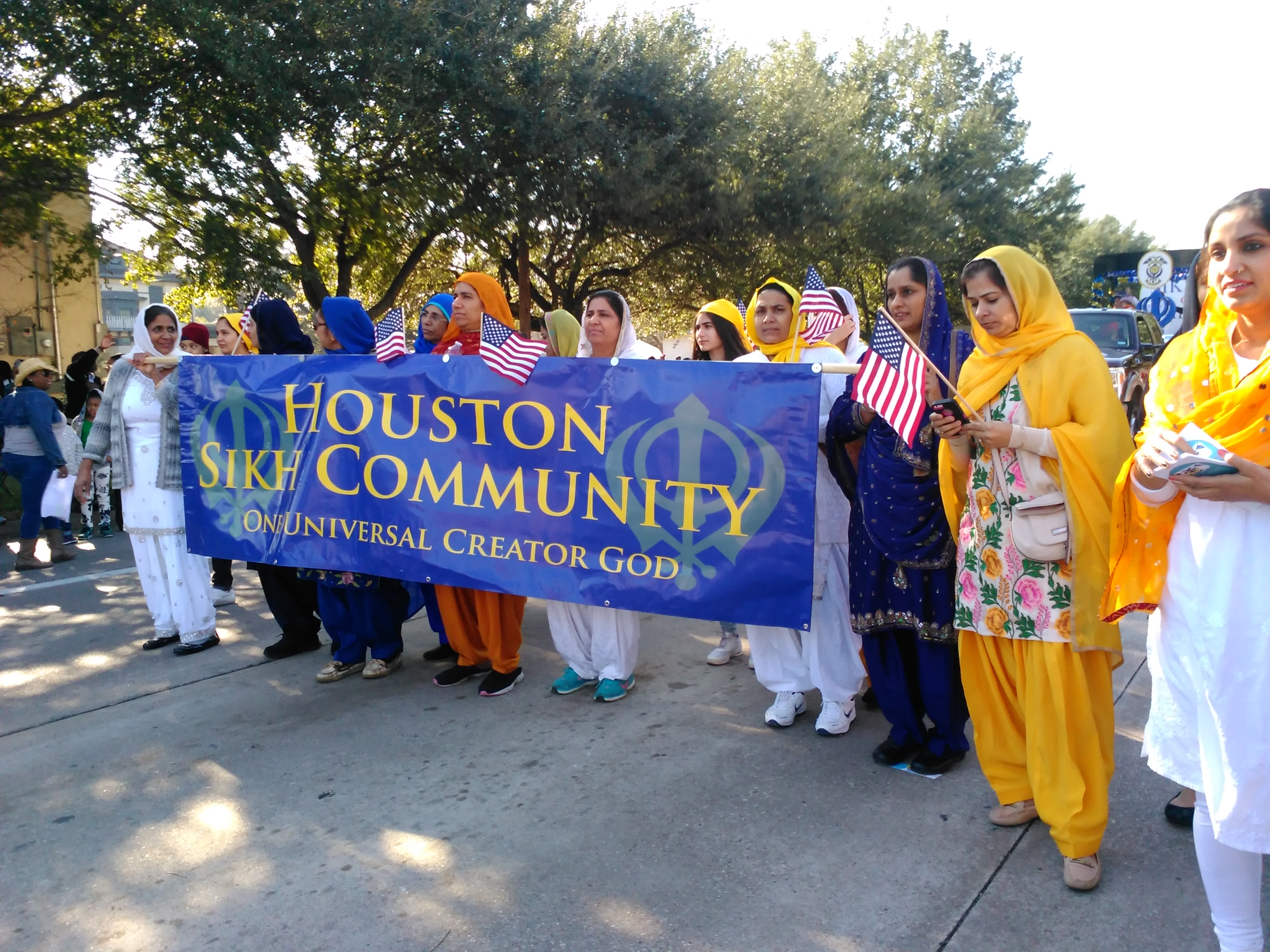
Houston Sikh Community at the 2016 Martin Luther King Day parade in Midtown Houston

Sikh people originally held religious services in private residences. In 1972, the Sikh Center of the Gulf Coast Area, the first dedicated Sikh center of worship, was established by Kanwaljeet Singh and other Sikhs. In 2012, the Sikh National Center stated that the city of Houston had 7,000 to 10,000 Sikhs. By 2016, the figure of Sikhs was similar and there were seven gurdwaras. As of 2012, the majority of the city's Sikhs originate from the portion of Punjab in India.

The Gurdwara Guru Teg Bahadur Sahib Ji is a Sikh temple in Houston, located off of Fairbanks North Houston.

The first Sikh police officer in Harris County was Sandeep Dhaliwal. He became an officer in 2009, and received an accommodation to wear his Sikh articles of faith (including the turban and unshorn hair and beard) in 2015. Dhaliwal was shot and killed while making a traffic stop in 2019.

== Zoroastrianism ==
In the 1970s, Zoroastrians began arriving to Houston. Originally they worshipped in private residences. The Zoroastrian Association of Houston (ZAH) was established in 1976. The Zarathushti Heritage and Cultural Center, in Southwest Houston opened in the 1990s.

Of the Zoroastrian groups in Houston, as of 2000, the main ones are Iranians and Parsis. As of that year, the total number of Iranians in Houston of all religions is, on a 10 to 1 basis, larger than the total Parsi population. As of 2000 within Houston there were about 12 Zoroastrian priests there. Yezdi Rustomji, author of The Zoroastrian Center: An Ancient Faith in Diaspora, stated that they were "variously divided in matters of Zarathushtrian orthodoxy."

As of 2000, the ZAH is majority Parsi. Rustomji wrote that because of that and the historic tensions between the Parsi and Iranian groups, the Iranians in Houston did not become full members of the ZAH. Rustomji stated that Iranian Zoroastrians "attend religious functions sporadically and remain tentative about their ability to fully integrate, culturally and religiously, with Parsis." In 1996, the Iranian population had its largest attendance at a ZAH event when it attended Jashne-e-Sade, an event the community created for ZAH. By 2000 some Muslim Iranians who were opposed to fundamentalism in the mosques began attending Zoroastrian events. Rustomji wrote in 2000 that between 2000 and 2005, Iranians were expected to make up a greater proportion of ZAH.

As of 2016, there were 650 Zoroastrians in Houston. Around that period, they had plans to build a fire temple. The fire temple, Bhandara Atash Kadeh in Southwest Houston, opened in 2019.

== Baháʼí Faith ==
The Houston Baháʼí Center is a Baháʼí organization in Houston. Most members are Persians. There are also other ethnic groups. As of 2010, many Houston Baháʼí are refugees from Iran. In Iran, many of their relatives and parents were arrested and/or executed. As of that year, there were roughly 14,000 Baháʼí in the entire State of Texas.

== Jainism ==
In the 1970s, Houston's Jain population began. Jain Vishva Bharati (JVB) Houston, a Jain organization, was started around 1999. At the time, it had 40 members. Two Samanijis from India went to Houston to operate the JVB. In 2009, Arlene Nisson Lassin wrote that by then "the organization has seen tremendous growth."

In 2009, the JVB's $2 million, 6,000-square-foot (560 m^{2}) Jain Vishva Bharati-Preksha Meditation Center was scheduled to open in 2009. The facility, in far west Houston, includes a 3,600-square-foot (330 m^{2}) meditation hall. Jain Vishva Bharati offers Sunday school classes. In addition, the Jain Society of Houston has a temple in west Houston.

In 2011, Morgan Wilson of the Houston Chronicle wrote that there were about 1,000 Jain families in the city, with 250 families regularly go to Jain Vishva Bharati to worship. In 2012, Jill Carroll of the Houston Chronicle stated that Greater Houston has about 700 Jain families. As of 2016, there were around 1,000 Jains.

== Yazidism ==
As of 2016, Houston had a group of Yazidis who practiced their religion. Yazda Global Yazidi Organization is a multi-national Yazidi global organization established in the aftermath of the Yazidi genocide in 2014 with headquarters in Houston.

== Scientology ==
The Church of Scientology operates the Church of Scientology Mission of Houston.

== Atheism ==
The group Houston Atheists, as of 2011, had 1,400 members. In a two-year period ending in 2011, the membership doubled.

== Paganism ==
As of the 1970s, the First Pagan Church was located in Montrose.

== Satanism ==
In 2015, the Greater Church of Lucifer opened in the Old Town Spring area of Spring, Texas, a census-designated place within the extraterritorial jurisdiction of Houston; the group anticipated that 40 persons would attend its first meeting. Christian groups protested the opening.

In 2018, the Satanic Temple of Houston began operations, with religious services held at the Brash Brewing Company in Northside, Houston on a regular basis. During the COVID-19 pandemic in Texas, the group instead began holding events in area coffeehouses where they share information on books that the members read; this was because the group could no longer use the brewery as it had closed. In 2022, the group had 20 people.

== See also ==
- Demographics of Houston
- Culture of Houston
