= BAPS Shri Swaminarayan Mandir Houston =

Hindu temple in Texas

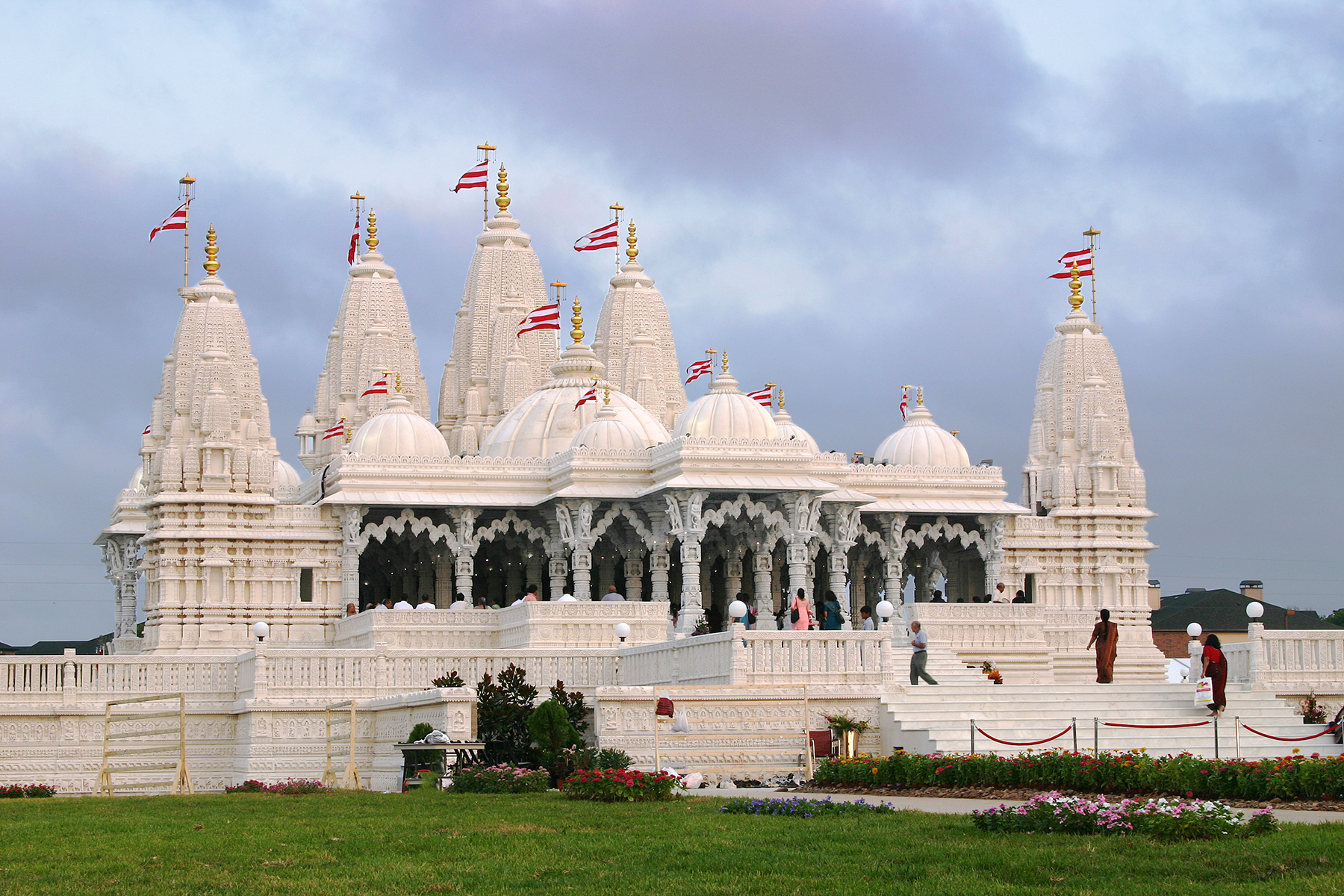

Religion
- Affiliation: Hinduism
- Deity: Swaminarayan, Radha Krishna, Sita Rama, Shiva-Parvati

Location
- Location: Fort Bend County
- State: Texas
- Country: United States
- Interactive map of BAPS Shri Swaminarayan Mandir Houston

Architecture
- Type: Shilpa Shastras
- Creator: Pramukh Swami Maharaj / BAPS
- Completed: July 2004 (consecrated)

Website
- houston.baps.org

BAPS Shri Swaminarayan Mandir is a Hindu temple in Houston, Texas, built by the BAPS Swaminarayan Sanstha. It is in unincorporated Fort Bend County, Texas, within the extraterritorial jurisdiction (ETJ) of Stafford and with a Stafford mailing address. The BAPS Swaminarayan Sanstha, which is headed by Mahant Swami Maharaj, is a denomination of the Swaminarayan tradition of Hinduism. It consists of a 11,500-square-foot (1,070 m^{2}), 73-foot (22 m) tall open-air temple and a 25,620-square-foot (2,380 m^{2}) surrounding deck. By July 2004 the cost to build the temple was $7 million at that time.

The temple materials were carved out of Italian marble and Turkish limestone by 3,000 craftsmen in various parts of India. The pieces were shipped to Houston, and construction began in March 2002. 175 volunteers, including some individuals resident in India, came to the Houston area to help build the temple. Most of the labor was donated. Up until the opening, some finishing touches to the structure were made. The marble and limestone add up to 33,000 pieces. The mandir was built in 28 months.

The mandir is the largest of its kind in Texas and was constructed according to guidelines outlined in ancient Hindu scriptures. The grounds spread over 22 acres and in addition to the mandir, include a haveli and the Understanding Hinduism exhibition. The haveli is a cultural center in which weekly congregations are held. The Understanding Hinduism exhibition provide visitors with a foundation of the key tenets of Hinduism.

== Mandir and daily rituals ==
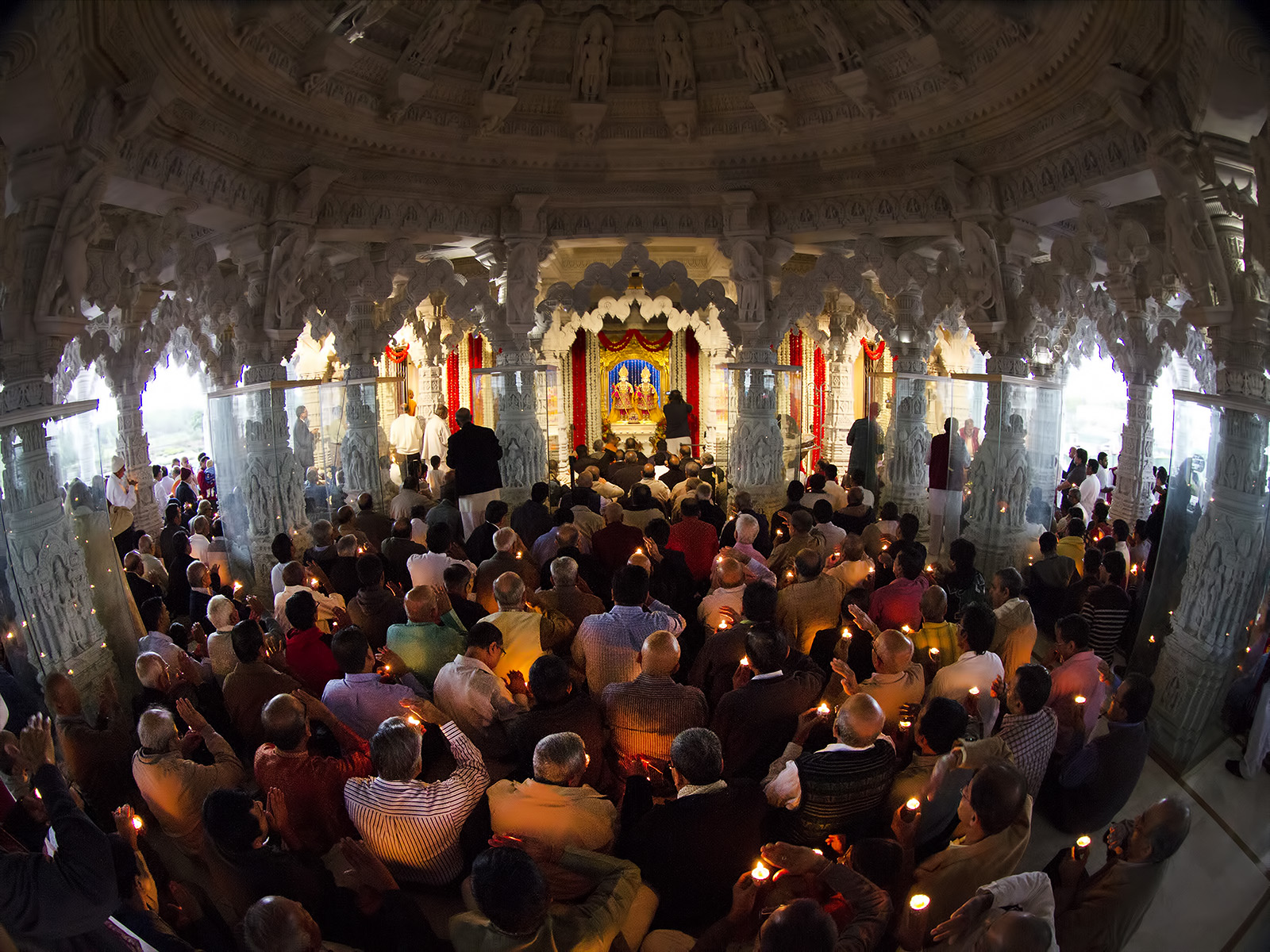
Aarti being performed

The temple is a type of ‘Shikarbaddha’ mandir, built according to principles laid out in the Shilpa Shastras, Hindu texts prescribing standards of sacred architecture. Within the mandir, murtis (sacred images of the deities) have been installed in different shrines. The central shrine holds the murti of Bhagwan Swaminarayan, with Gunatitanand Swami to his left, together worshipped as Akshar-Purushottam Maharaj. Similarly, different shrines hold murtis of other Hindu deities such as Radha Krishna, Shivji Parvatiji, Sitji Ramji, Hanumanji, Ganapatiji and the lineage of BAPS gurus who are Swaminarayan's spiritual successors. The murtis are made from marble and are considered to be imbued with the living presence of divine beings. Accordingly, Swaminarayan swamis (Hindu monks) offer devotional worship to the deities throughout the day. Before dawn, they awaken the deities by singing morning hymns, called prabhatiya. The deities are then bathed and offered food and garments depending on the time of the day and season. Food that has been offered to the deities is considered sanctified. These holy offerings are distributed to the devotees as prasadam. Throughout the day, arti, a ritual where devotees sing the glory of God while a lighted wick is circulated before the murtis, is performed five times a day and named Mangala Aarti, Shanagar Aarti, Rajabhoga Aarti, Sandhya Aarti and Shayana Aarti, respectively. During midday, lunch is offered. In the evening, dinner is offered. Finally, the swamis put the murtis to rest by adorning them with night garments. While food is being offered to the murtis and when they are put to rest, their chamber doors are closed.

== Mandir activities ==
The congregation gathers for weekly assemblies in the haveli. Devotional hymns are sung and spiritual discourses covering teachings in Hindu scriptures are conducted. In addition, there is a wide spectrum of activities for youths such as Hindu heritage classes, Indian music classes and Gujarati language training. Further, leadership seminars and conferences held over school intersessions encourage youths to take an active role in their community and mandir activities. During major Hindu festivals, youths are given the opportunity to showcase these learnings in the weekly assemblies through singing devotional hymns, performing traditional dances and delivering spiritual discourses and speeches. Sports tournaments are held to promote physical well-being and teamwork and to encourage youths to build camaraderie.

== The BAPS congregation in Houston ==
In 1977, after Pramukh Swami Maharaj's first visit to Houston, a small group of devotees started gathering in homes to hold spiritual assemblies. By 1979, the spiritual assemblies were being held in community halls to accommodate the increasing congregation size. An assembly of 350 devotees gathered at Alief Hastings High School during Pramukh Swami's visit in July 1980.

By 1985, the continued growth of the congregation prompted the need for a larger space. As a result, a site for a new mandir was chosen in Stafford, Fort Bend County. The groundbreaking ceremony took place in 1986. The newly built mandir was situated on a five-acre plot, consisting of an 8,000 square foot assembly hall. The mandir was located on Brand Lane and was inaugurated in 1988 by Pramkuh Swami.

In the late 1990s, the congregation began planning the development of a new Shikarbaddha mandir that would be situated in next to the current mandir. Pramukh Swami performed the foundation stone laying ceremony for this mandir in September 2000.

== Mandir construction and opening ==
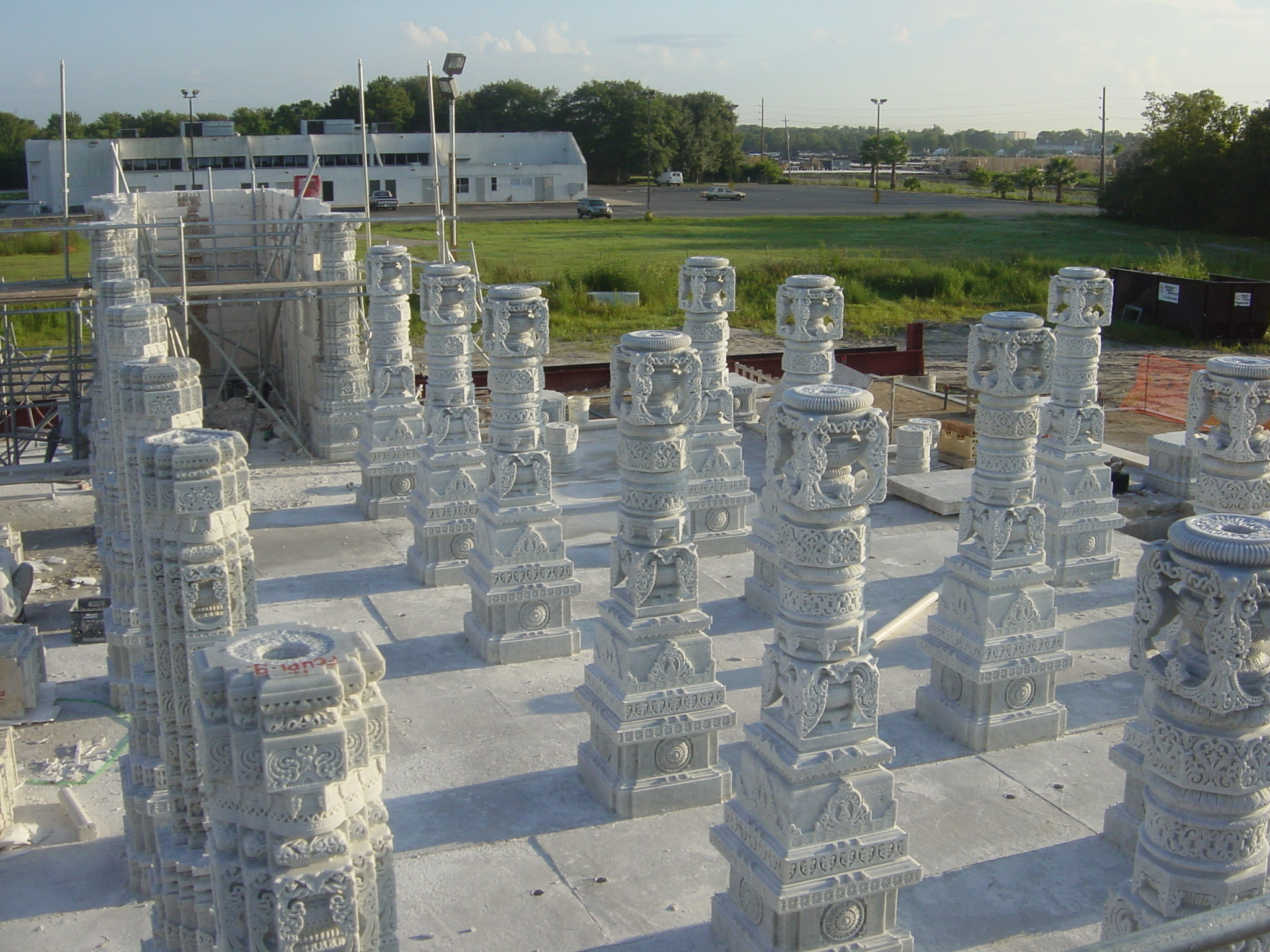
BAPS Houston Columns

Construction commenced in 2002 with the celebration of the first carved stone-laying ceremony. The mandir was officially inaugurated on 25 July 2004 in the presence of Pramkuh Swami. The mandir is composed of 33,000 pieces of marble and limestone that have been hand-carved in India by 2,400 artisans. Shipped to Houston in 150 containers, the marble pieces were fitted together in tongue-and-groove fashion like a three-dimensional jigsaw puzzle. The entire structure, including the 4-foot foundation, does not contain a single piece of iron or steel.

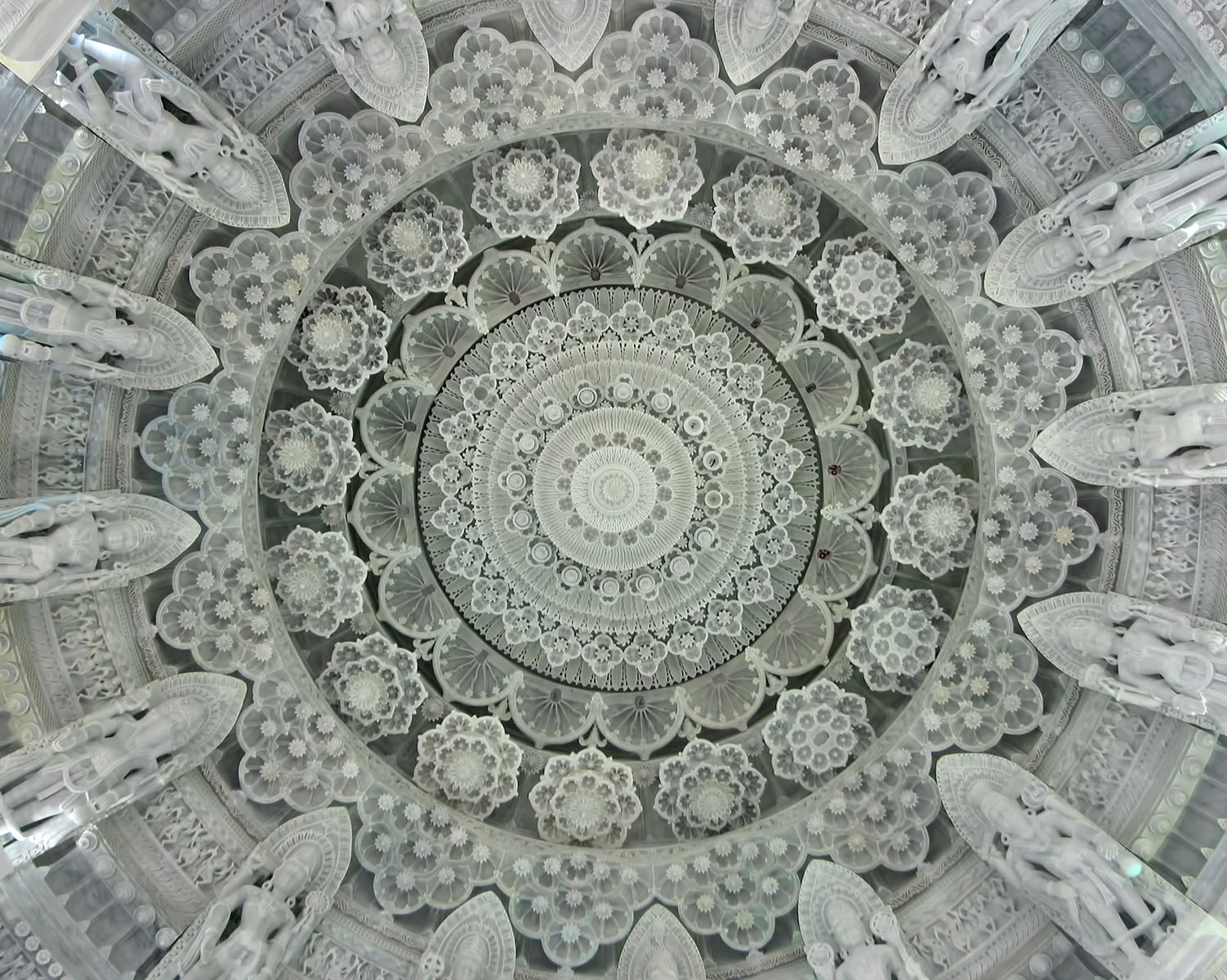
BAPS Houston Mandir Central Dome

The mandir is 73 feet high, 125 feet long and 95 feet wide. The 11,500 square foot base is surrounded by a 25,620 square foot deck. The detail in the columns and walls include carvings of deities, dancers, musicians, elephants, horses, flowers and geometric designs. Prior to his trip to Houston to inaugurate the mandir, Pramukh Swami penned a letter for all devotees. Swamishri explained that Swaminarayan took birth to redeem innumerable jivas and grant them ultimate liberation. Further, the mandir and the guru play a central role in this mission.

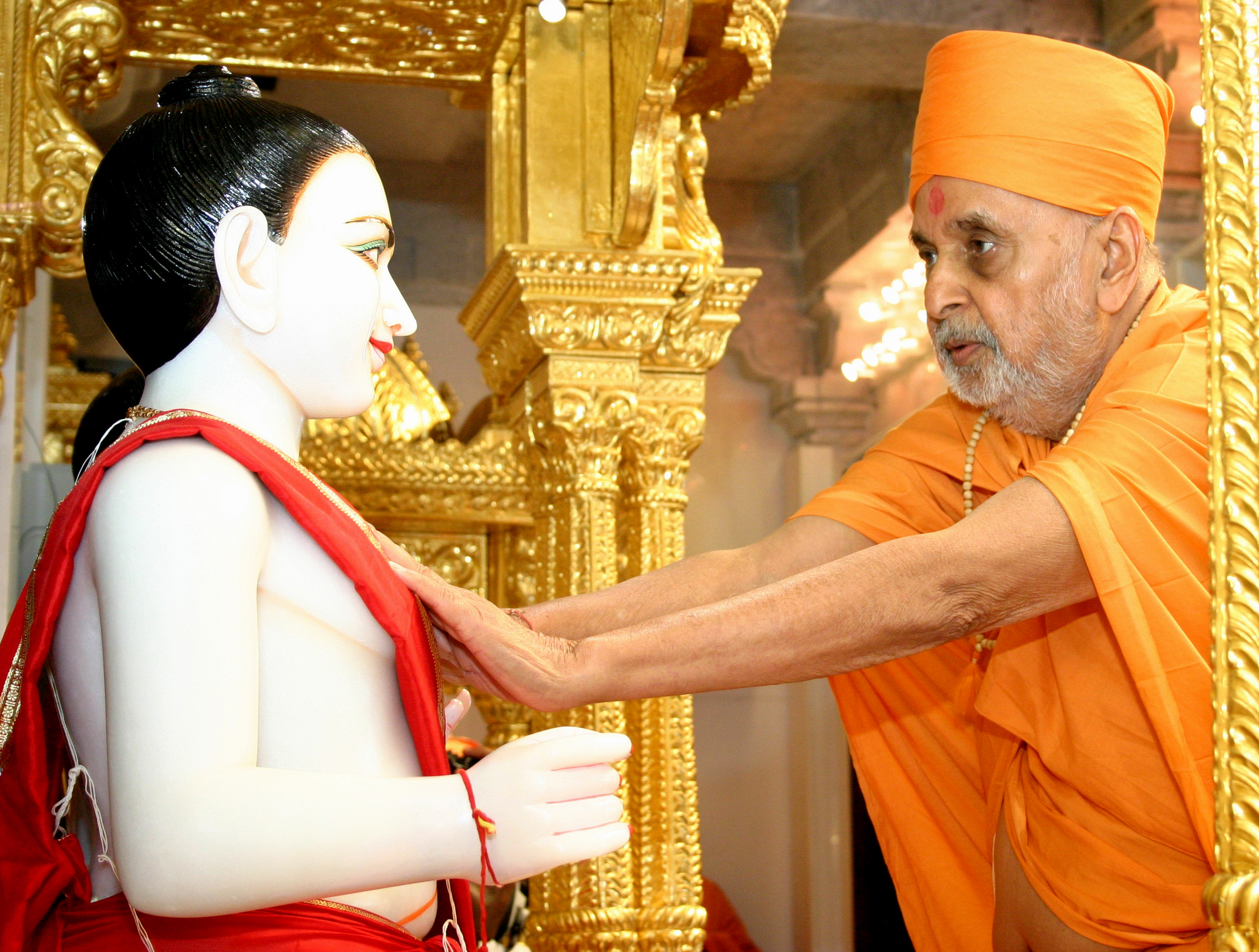
Pramukh Swami Maharaj sanctifying murtis

Pramukh Swami arrived for the eighth time to Houston on 20 July 2004. On 21 July, he sanctified the spires and flags which would be mounted at the top of the mandir. The brass and gold leafed spires symbolize nectar and the flags symbolize victory and attainment. On 24 July, a shobha yatra (colorful procession) of all the murtis took place along a seven-mile route through the streets of Houston. The procession itself was 1.3 miles long. The procession included a total of eight floats.

On 25 July 2004, the mandir was officially inaugurated. The murtis were installed in the shrines, after which they were consecrated by Pramukh Swami.

== Human trafficking ==
In May 2021, a lawsuit was filed against BAPS by several volunteer artisans from India who were involved in the construction alleging that the temple administrators violated labor laws. In relation to this, the Federal Bureau of Investigation, Department of Labor, and Department of Homeland Security visited the site on "court-authorized law enforcement activity." The lawsuit alleges that over 200 Indian men, mostly of the Dalit caste, were brought from India to the US and were subject to wage theft, forced labor, and human trafficking.

BAPS Spokespersons rejected the allegations listed in the lawsuit as false stating that the artisans had come to the US as religious volunteers to offer seva, or religious service, as part of their devotion. They further stated that federal, state, and local government agencies had been regularly inspecting and approving the various mandir projects where artisans in this program have volunteered over the last 20 years.

As of July 2023, 12 of the plaintiffs have withdrawn from the lawsuit, stating that they were coerced into making false charges against BAPS by a US based lawyer named Swati Sawant with threats of imprisonment, promises of US citizenship and large sums of money for them and their families The dozen withdrawn plaintiffs stated that they have been offering service at BAPS temples in the US and India for many years and had "never experienced any pressure, any casteism or discrimination". The lawsuit is on-hold, pending an investigation. Some news outlets characterized the trial as raising questions about the ability of US labor laws to account for certain forms of religious volunteerism.

== Community involvement ==
=== International Women's Day celebrations ===
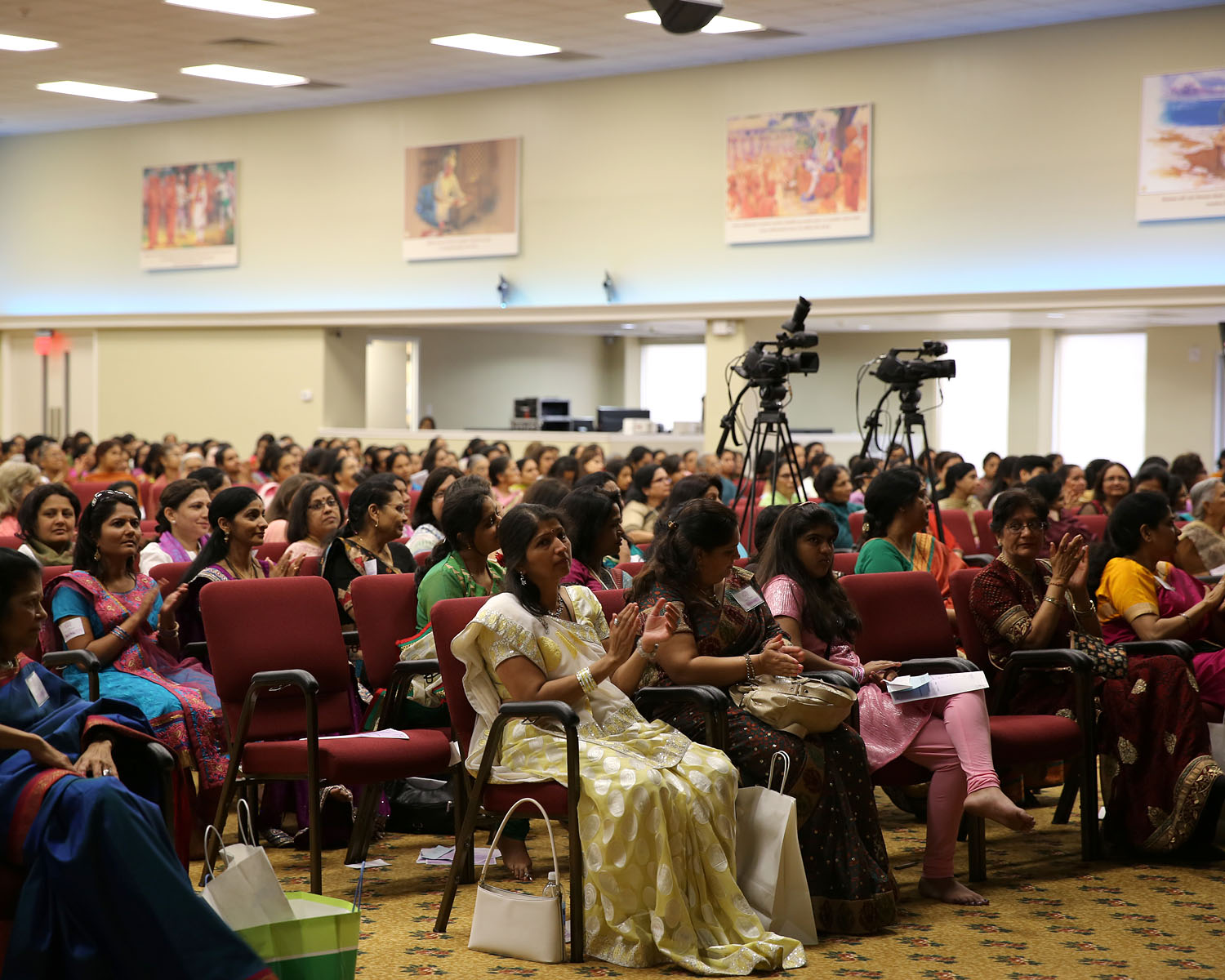
Women's Conference Assembly

The mandir has been hosting an annual Women's Day conference since 2008. In 2012, the focus was on the ancient Hindu teachings of the four Puruṣārtha (goals of life). The theme was meant to resonate with community members who work to balance their family and career. Panelists and speakers shared relevant applications of the Puruṣārtha teachings. In 2013, the theme of the conference was "Timeless Traditions: Celebrating the Past, Cultivating the Future." Guest speakers included Nandita Parvathaneni, wife of Honorable Consul General of India in Houston, Harish Parvathaneni, and Alpana Thakker, a prominent lawyer in the Houston community. Panelist discussions and speeches focused on the importance of instilling culture and tradition in future generations.

=== Annual walkathon ===
Alongside BAPS centers throughout North America, the BAPS mandir in Houston holds an annual walkathon in support of various charities. Participants work to raise funds for BAPS Charities initiatives and local beneficiaries. In 2011 and 2012, over 700 walkers participated in the walks respectively. Proceeds went towards the American Diabetes Foundation and the Stafford MSD Education Foundation. In 2013, the number of participants increased to 1000. The 100 Club's Survivor Fund for firefighters was added as a beneficiary.

=== Annual health fair ===
BAPS Charities held its 13th annual health fair in the Stafford mandir complex in April 2013. 100 healthcare professionals offered services in the areas of pediatrics, gynecology, cardiology, ophthalmology, dentistry and orthopedics. The annual health fair offers a variety of free services such as physical examinations, dental screenings and vision screenings. More advanced services are offered at a nominal cost. These include subsidized echocardiograms and PSA hormone tests In total, over 1200 participants underwent a total of 6000 procedures and tests.

== Restaurant ==
The temple includes the Gujarati restaurant Shayona Cafe.

== Gallery ==
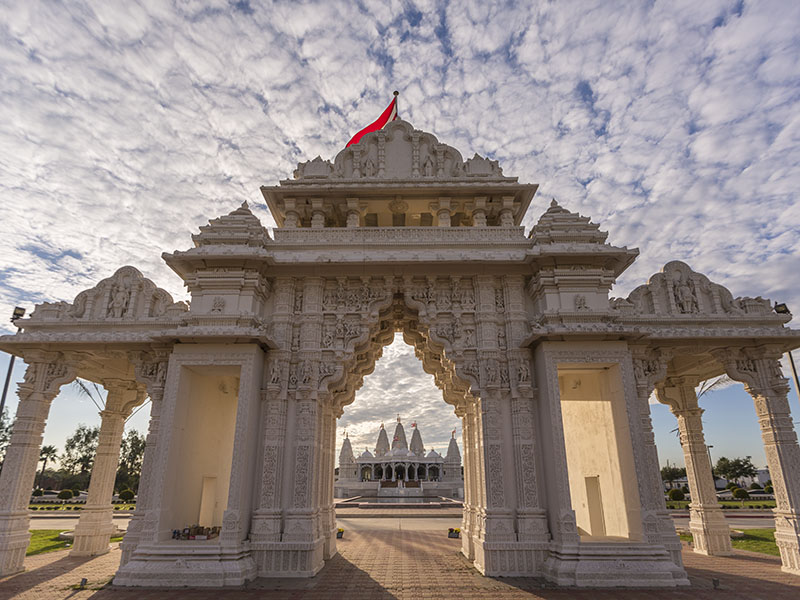
Gateway to the mandir

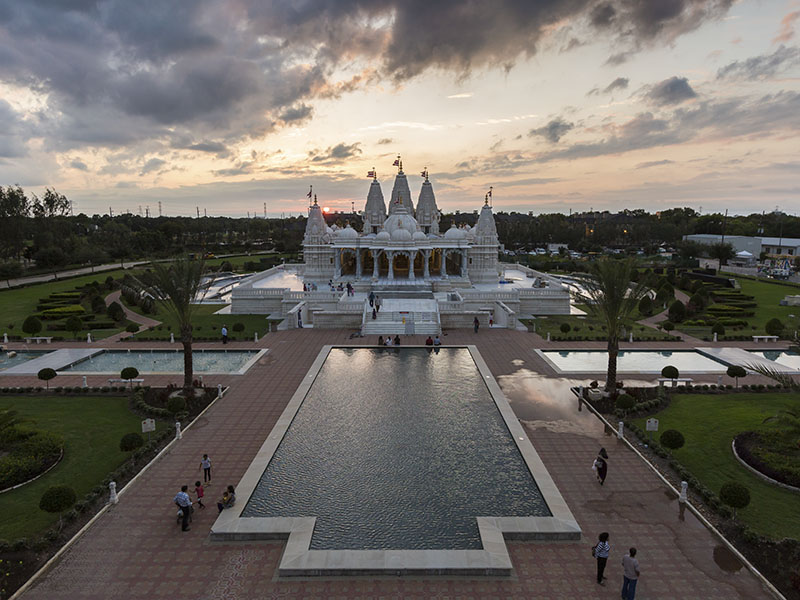
Mandir and the reflection pond (front, aerial view)

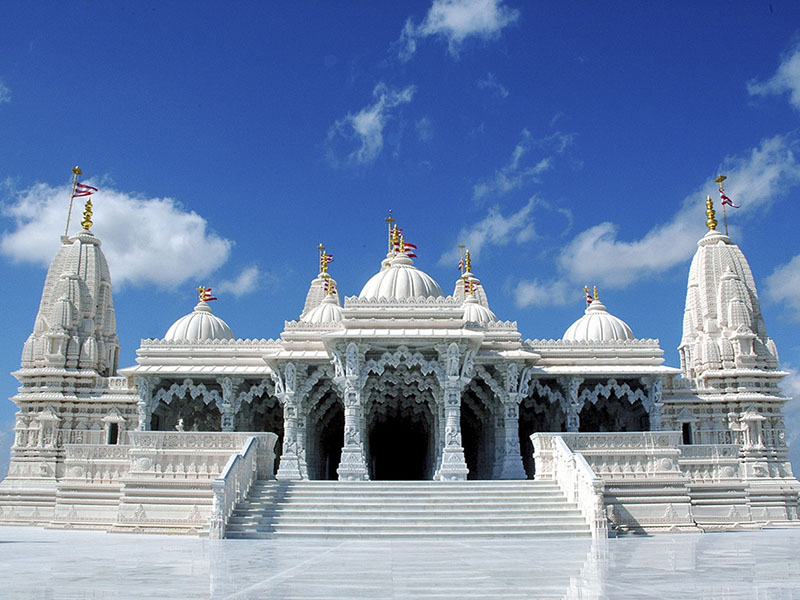
Mandir (front view)

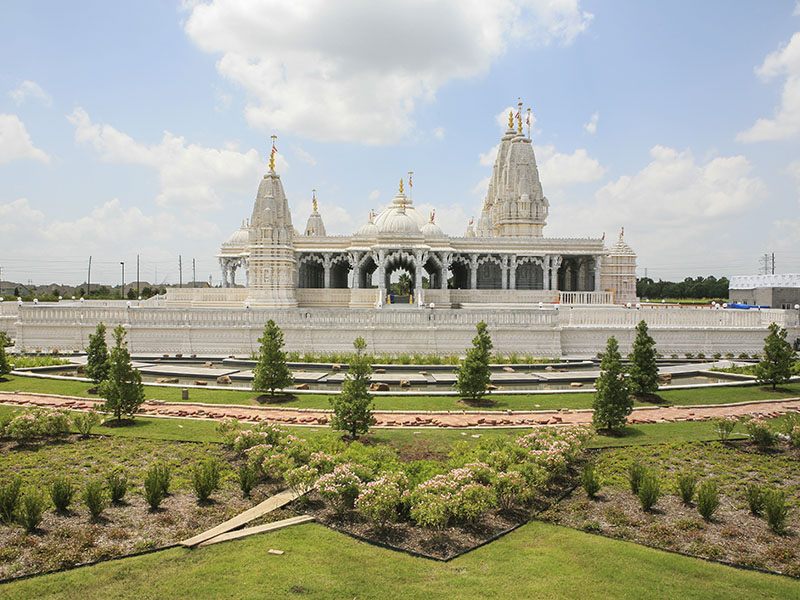
Mandir (side view)

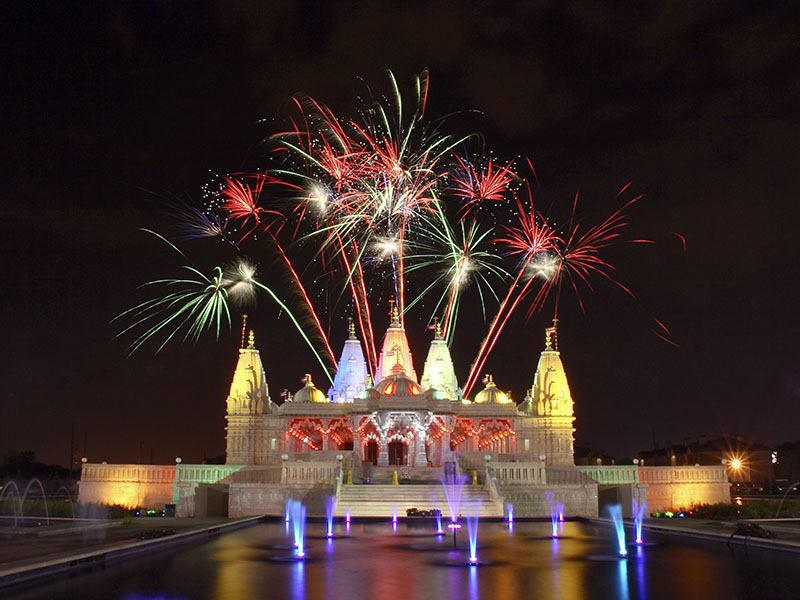
Diwali firework celebrations at the mandir

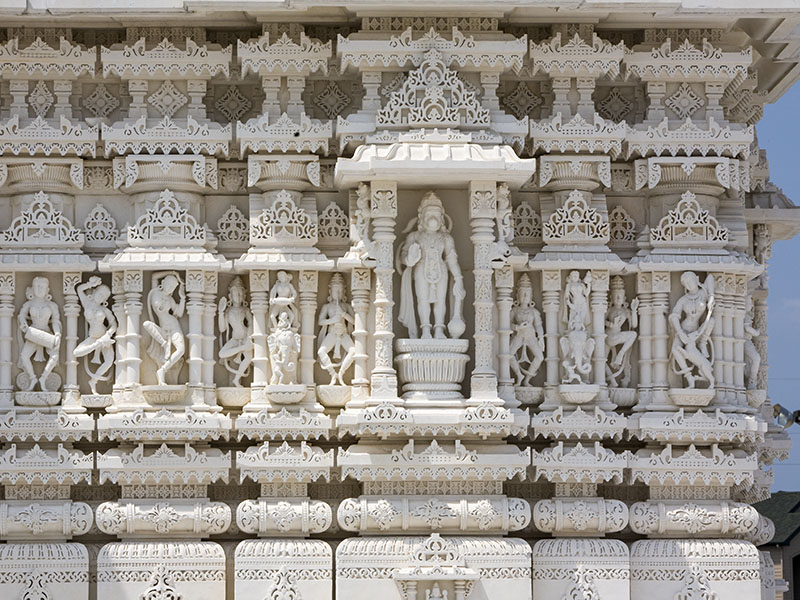
Exterior carvings surrounding the mandir

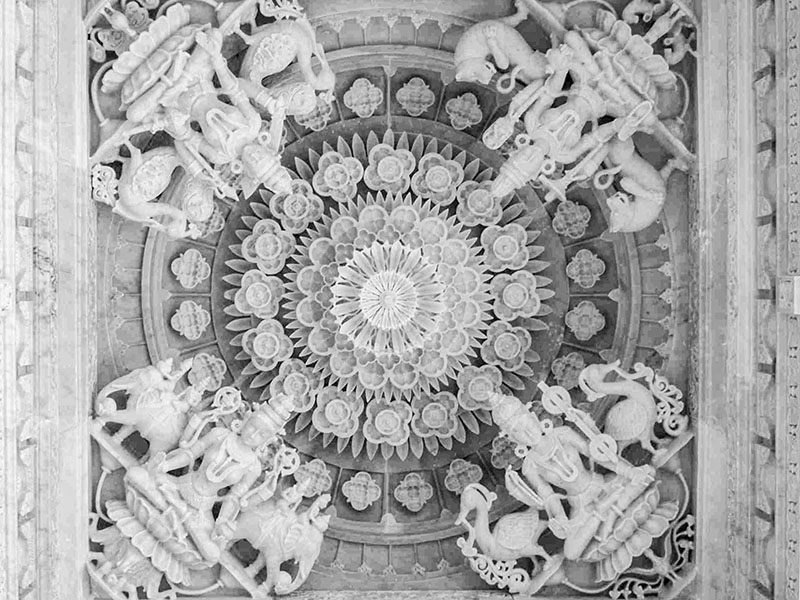
Carved ceiling panel

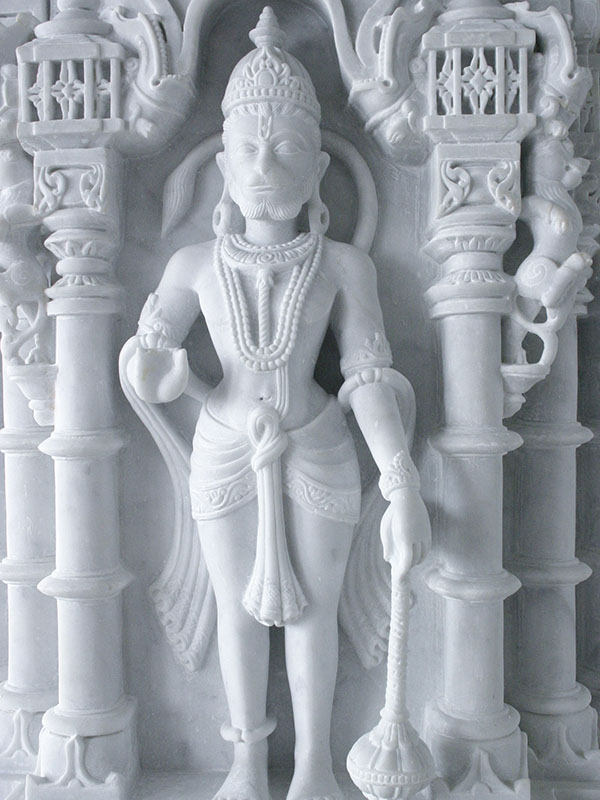
Carving of Hanuman

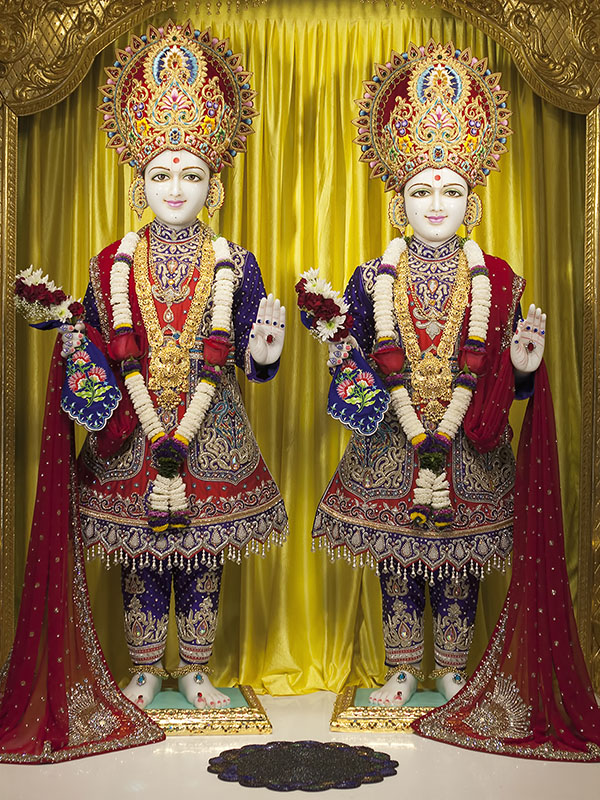
Swaminarayan and Gunatitanand Swami (collectively known as Akshar-Purushottam Maharaj)

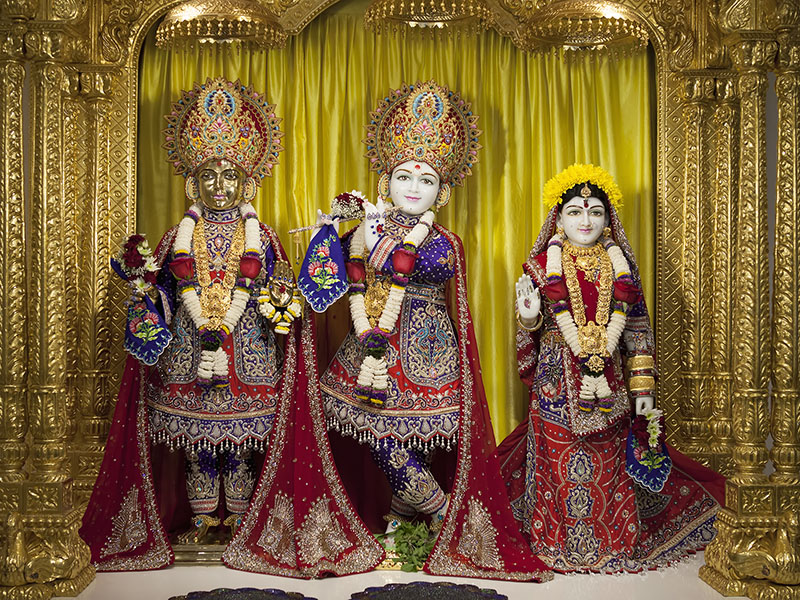
Hari Krishna Maharaj, Krishna and Radha

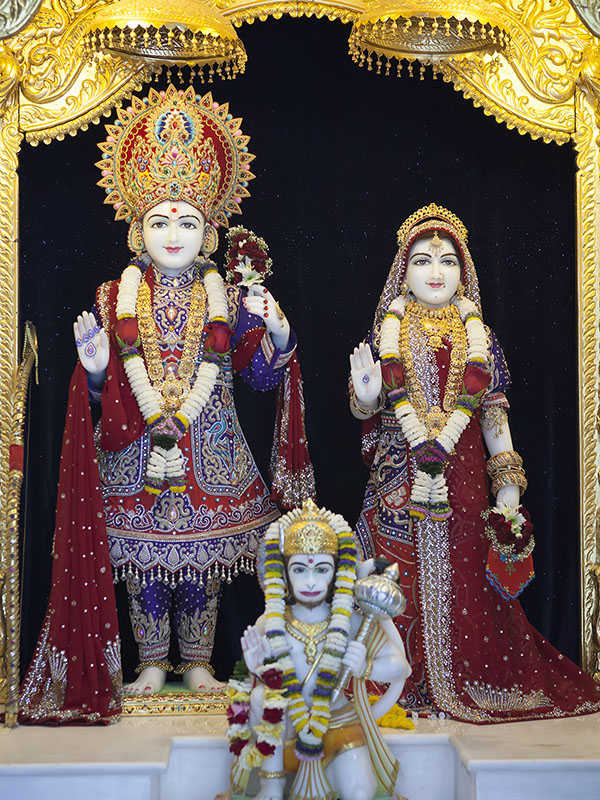
Rama, Sita, and Hanuman

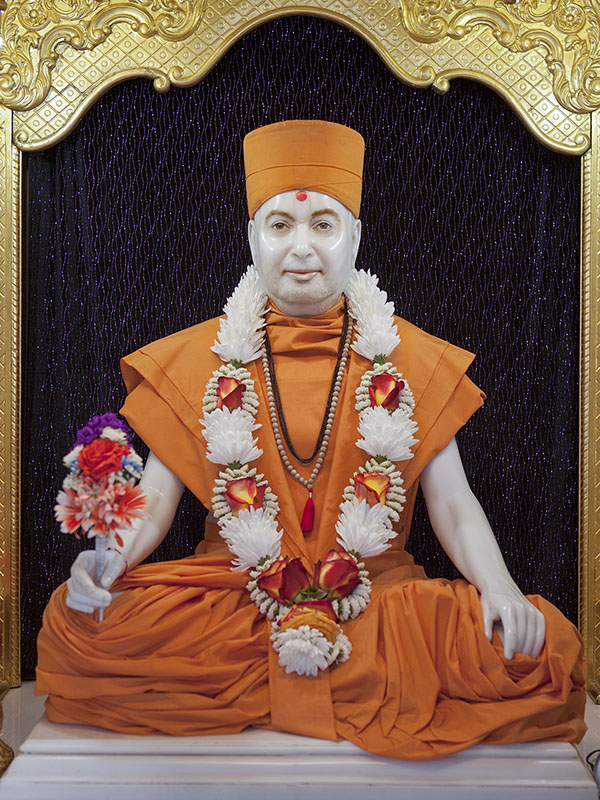
Pramukh Swami Maharaj

== See also ==
- Religion in Houston
