= Ganesa =

Ganesa may refer to:

- Gaṇeśa, alternate spelling for the name of the Hindu god
- Ganesa (gastropod), a genus of marine snails in the family Turbinidae
- Gaṇeśa Daivajna, 16th century Indian astronomer, mathematician, and astrologer

== See also ==
- Ganes (disambiguation)
- Ganesha (disambiguation)
- Ganesan, an Indian surname
