= Ganeshamoorthy =

Ganeshamoorthy கணேசமூர்த்தி
- Romanisation: Kaṇēcamūrtti
- Pronunciation: [kaɳeːsaˈmuːɾt̪ːi]
- Gender: Male
- Language: Tamil

Origin
- Meaning: 'Manifestation of Ganesha'
- Region of origin: Southern India; North-eastern Sri Lanka

Other names
- Alternative spelling: Ganesamoorthy; Ganeshamurthi; Ganesamurthi
- Derived: Ganesha
- See also: Ganesan

Ganeshamoorthy (Tamil: கணேசமூர்த்தி, romanized: Kaṇēcamūrtti), also romanized Ganesamoorthy, Ganeshamurthi or Ganesamurthi, is a Tamil male given name. Due to the Tamil tradition of using patronymic surnames, it may also be a surname for males and females. It means 'manifestation of Ganesha' (compare murti).

== Notable people ==
- Avinashi Ganeshamurthi (1947–2024), Indian politician
- Rigivan Ganeshamoorthy (born 1999), Italian para-athlete and world record holder
- S. Ganeshamoorthy, Sri Lankan politician
- V. Chinnaiya Manrayar Ganesamoorthy (1928–2001), known as Sivaji Ganesan, Indian actor and film producer

== See also ==
- Ganesan
