= Ganpat =

Ganpat may refer to:

- Ganesha, a Hindu god, also known as Ganapati or Ganpat
- Ganapatha, Sanskrit grammatical term in Pāṇini's Aṣṭādhyāyī
- "Ganpat", a song by Mika Singh from the 2007 Indian film Shootout at Lokhandwala
- Ganapath, a 2023 Indian science fiction film by Vikas Bahl
- Ganpat University in Gujarat, India
- Ganpat Patil (1920–2008), Indian actor
- Ganpat Rao Gaekwad (1816–1856), Indian Maharaja
- Jayant Ganpat Nadkarni, Indian Navy admiral
- Palwankar Ganpat, Indian cricketer
- Thakur Ganpat Singh (1895–?), Indian politician
- Martin Louis Alan Gompertz, Anglo-Indian soldier and writer, also known by the pseudonym of 'Ganpat'

== See also ==
- Ganpatrao, an Indian male given name
- Ganapati (disambiguation)
