= Ganpatrao =

Ganpatrao or Ganpat Rao is a Hindic given name that may refer to

- Ganpatrao Deshmukh (1927–2021), Indian politician
- Ganpatrao Devji Tapase (1908–1991), Indian politician
- Ganpatrao Jadhav, Indian freedom activist, journalist and writer
- Ganpatrao Narayanrao Madiman (1879–1947), Indian businessman, banker and merchant
- Ganpat Rao Gaekwad (1816–1856), Indian Maharaja
- Janardan Ganpatrao Negi (born 1936), Indian geophysicist
- Prataprao Ganpatrao Jadhav, Indian politician
- Ramesh Ganpatrao Bundile, Indian politician

== See also ==
- Ganpat (disambiguation)
