= Vinayaka (disambiguation) =

Vinayaka, or Ganesha, is the Hindu god of new beginnings, success, and wisdom.

Vinayaka or Vinayak may also refer to:

- Vinayakas, a group of four demons in Hindu mythology
- Kangiten, the Japanese Buddhist elephant-headed god

== People ==
- Vinayak Damodar Savarkar (1883–1966), Indian political activist and writer
- Vinayak Janardan Karandikar, Indian poet in Marathi
- Vinayaka Krishna Gokak (1909–1992), Indian writer
- Vinayak Lohani, Indian humanitarian
- Vinayak Mane, Indian cricketer
- Vinayak Narahari Bhave, Indian non-violence and human rights activist
- Vinayak Pai, Indian businessman, CEO of Tata Projects
- Vinayak Pandurang Karmarkar (1891–1967), Indian sculptor
- Vinayak Sasikumar (born 1994), Indian lyricist
- Vinayak Torvi, Indian musician
- Vinayakan, Indian actor

== See also ==
- Ganesha (disambiguation)
- Vinayak Rao, a fictional character portrayed by Sohum Shah in the 2018 Indian film Tumbbad
- Vinayakan, Indian film actor and music composer
- Vinayakudu (film), a 2008 Indian Telugu-language film
- Ashtavinayaka, Ganesha temples in Maharashtra, India
- Binayak, Nepal, a city in Nepal
- Binayak Sen, Indian activist
