= Hindu Temple of The Woodlands =

- Location in Texas

Religion
- Affiliation: Hinduism

Location
- Location: Spring
- State: Texas
- Country: United States
- Coordinates: 30.180583°N 95.544693°W

Architecture
- Completed: 2011

Website
- www.woodlandshindutemple.org

The Hindu Temple of The Woodlands is a Hindu temple in The Woodlands, Texas, in Greater Houston.

== History ==
In 2005 the Hindu Temple organization was created, buying land later that year. In 2008 the construction on the initial two buildings, the sanctuary and welcome center, began.

This temple, originally the sole Hindu temple serving the northern part of Greater Houston, was scheduled to open in 2011. The temple, built for $3 million, is located in a 10,000-square-foot (930 m^{2}) stone exterior building on an 8-acre (3.2 ha) plot of land along the Woodlands Parkway. It serves Hindus living in The Woodlands, Conroe, Spring, Tomball, and northern Harris County. The planning, fundraising, and construction took six years. Before the temple was built, residents of the service area of the temple had to travel about one and half hours per direction to temples in Pearland and Sugar Land.

In 2018, each prayer or meditation meeting has 100-200 adherents. That year temple was adding more 100 parking spaces and had plans to build another building. The temple celebrates Ganesh Chaturthi and Holi. In 2023, the cultural and education center was under construction and in 2024, it opened.

== Activities ==
The temple holds public holi celebrations and offers free yoga classes. It also offers heritage classes for five Indian languages.

== See also ==
- Religion in Houston
