= Sri Meenakshi Temple (Brazoria County, Texas) =

Sri Meenakshi Devasthanam
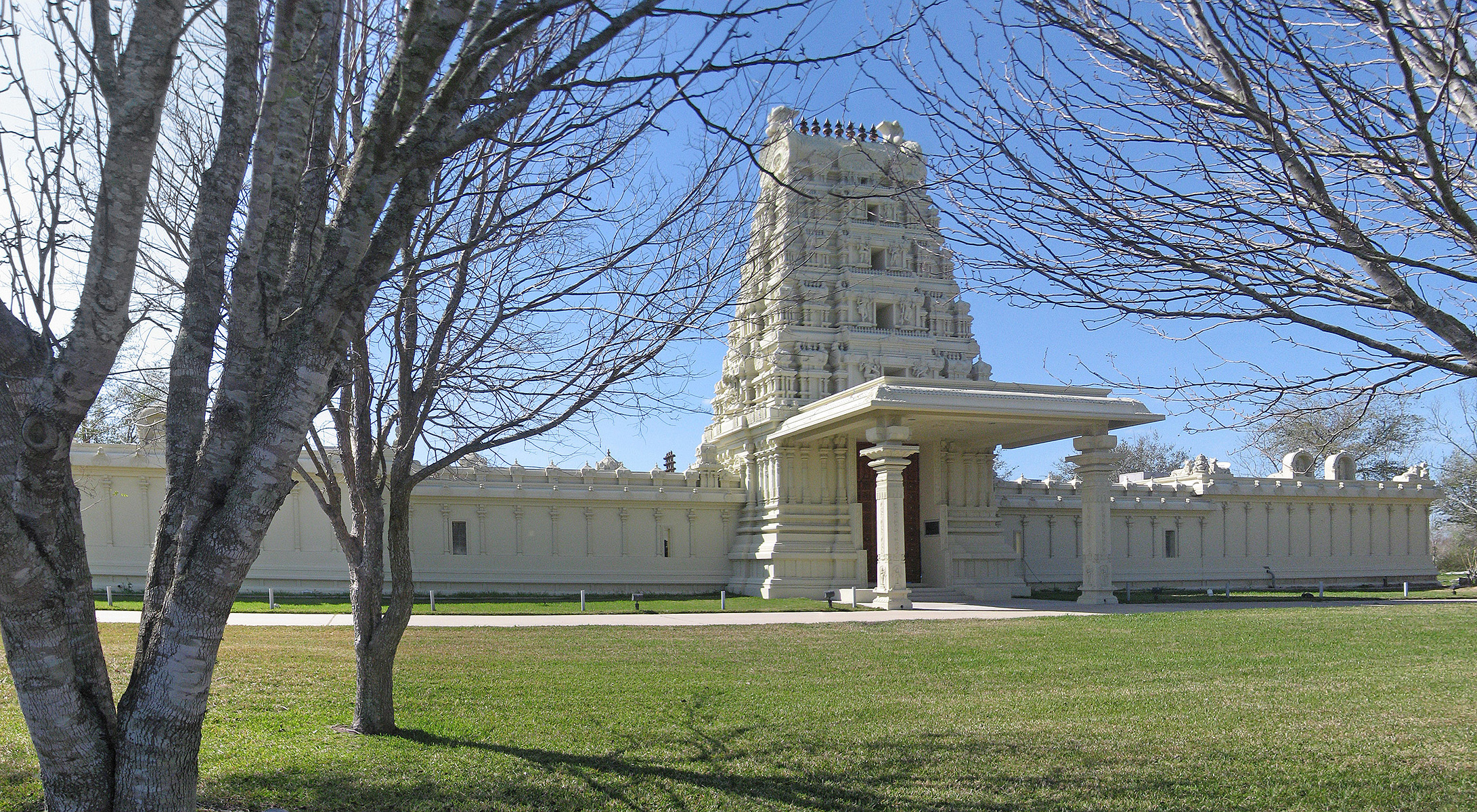

- Location in Texas

Religion
- Affiliation: Hinduism
- Deity: Meenakshi (Parvati)

Location
- Location: Unincorporated Brazoria County
- State: Texas
- Country: United States
- Coordinates: 29.522919144347274°N 95.297626°W

Architecture
- Architect: S. M. Ganapathy Sthapathi
- Type: Dravidian architecture
- Completed: 1982, 1995

Website
- www.meenakshi.org

The Sri Meenakshi Temple (also called the Sri Meenakshi Devasthanam) is a Hindu temple located in unincorporated Brazoria County, Texas, in the Houston metropolitan area, with a Pearland postal address and in the Pearland extraterritorial jurisdiction. The temple's presiding deity is the goddess Meenakshi, an aspect of Parvati whose consort is Sundareswarar, an aspect of Shiva. The Sri Meenakshi Temple in Pearland is the only temple outside of India that is dedicated to Meenakshi and it is a replica of the Meenakshi Temple in Madurai, Tamil Nadu, India. The Sri Meenakshi Temple in Pearland was built in 1982 and was designed by Indian architect S. M. Ganapathy Sthapathi in the South Indian Dravidian style of Hindu temple architecture. It is also the third-oldest Hindu temple in the United States.

The Sri Meenakshi Temple attracts Hindu devotees and visitors from across the Houston metropolitan area. It is considered one of Greater Houston's most prominent religious landmarks as well as a major visitor attraction in Pearland.

== History ==
The Sri Meenakshi Temple Society was established in 1977. The land for the temple, a five acre site, was acquired between 1976 and 1978. A plan for the site was drawn up by Ranjit Banerjee, a professor of architecture at the University of Houston. The temple's first permanent structure was a Ganesha temple. The first Mahakumbhabhishekam (inauguration ceremony) for the main shrine, designed by Indian architect S. M. Ganapathy Sthapathi, was performed in 1982, making it the third-oldest Hindu temple in the United States. Fundraising campaigns for the temple often included prominent Indian classical musical artists, including Parveen Sultana, M. Balamuralikrishna, Seerkazhi Govindarajan, and M. S. Subbulakshmi.

The temple expanded in subsequent years, with the rajagopuram and corner temples being completed in 1995. The Sri Meenakshi Temple's architecture reflects the Dravidian architectural style of South Indian Hindu temples. The temple is made of white granite.

== Shrines ==
The temple's main shrine is dedicated to Meenakshi, Sundareswarar, Venkateshwara (a form of Vishnu), and Lakshmi. Other shrines within the temple complex are dedicated to Ganesha, Murugan, Valli, Deivanai, Rama, Ayyappan, Durga, Nandi, and Garuda. In addition to the main shrine, the temple has four additional corner shrines – one at each corner. The temple also has sculptures of the Tamil Alvar and Nayanar poet-saints and gurus of Vedanta philosophy (Adi Shankaracharya, Ramanujacharya, and Madhvacharya).

There is a separate temple dedicated to Ganesh which served as the original temple in 1977 and it was reconstructed in 2013.

== Other facilities ==
In addition to the temple and other shrines, the Sri Meenakshi Temple is home to a peacock sanctuary, a kalyana mandapam (function hall), library, and a canteen that serves South Indian vegetarian food. There is also the Carriage House which houses chariots used for the deities for various festivals.
