= Ganapati (disambiguation) =

Ganesha or Ganapati is the Hindu god of knowledge.

Ganapati, Ganapatti, Ganapathy and Ganapathi may also refer to:

- Bṛhaspati, Hindu Vedic deity and god of planet Jupiter
- Ganapati (novel), a 1920 Telugu novel
- Ganapati (raga), Indian musical raga created by M. Balamuralikrishna
- Ganapathi (actor), Indian actor
- Ganapathy (Maoist), General Secretary of Communist Party of India
- Ganapathy, Coimbatore, a suburb in the city of Coimbatore
- Ganapati (Kakatiya dynasty), a 13th century ruler of southern India

== See also ==
- Ganesha (disambiguation)
- Ganpat (disambiguation)
