= Khairatabad Ganesh =

Ganesha's idol in Hyderabad

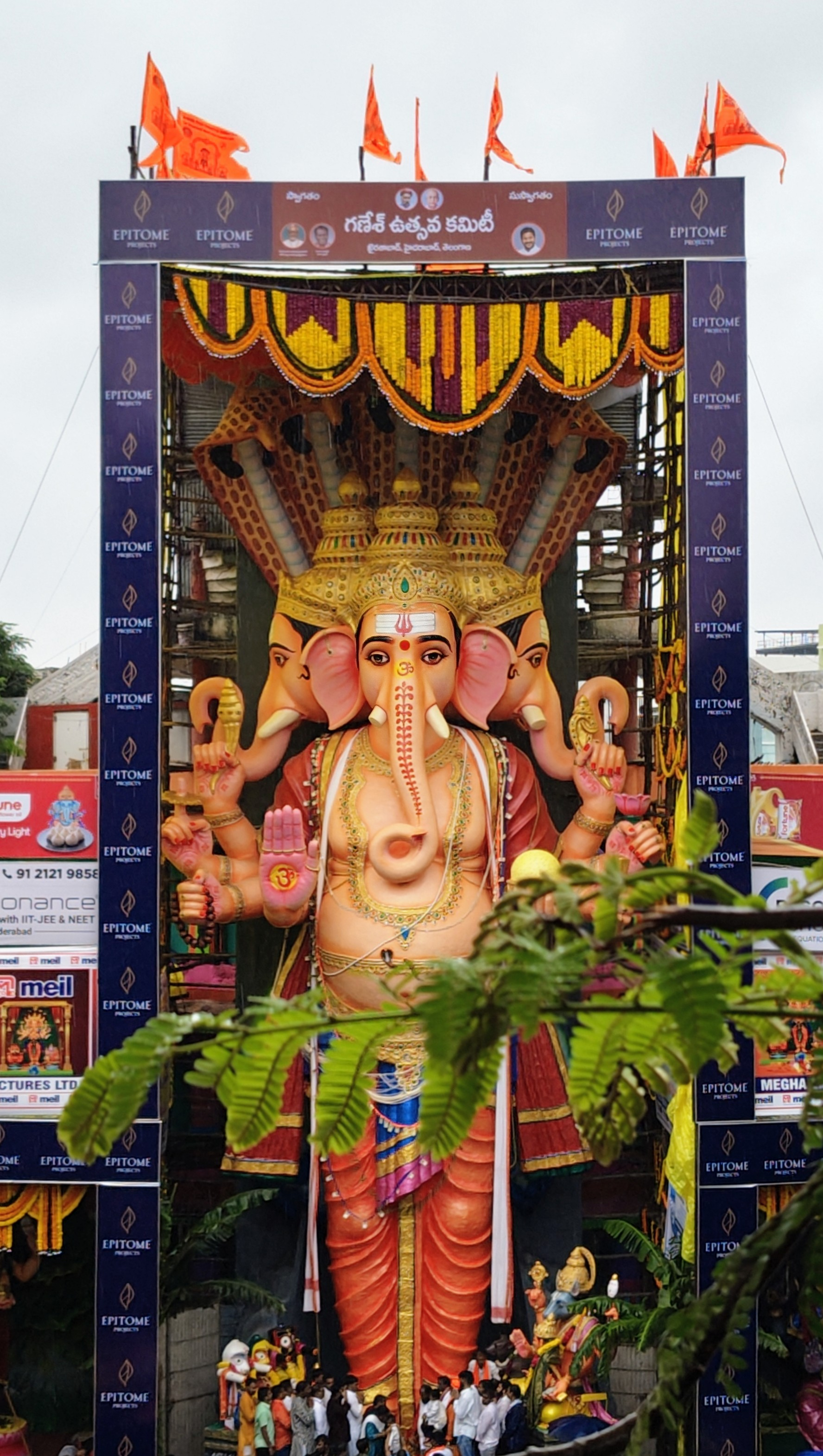
- The Khairatabad Ganesh idol in 2025
- Status: Active
- Genre: Festival ceremony
- Begins: With Ganesh Chaturthi
- Ends: After 10 days
- Frequency: Annual
- Locations: Khairatabad, Hyderabad, Telangana
- Coordinates: 17.410713°N 78.46373°E
- Country: India
- Years active: 72
- Inaugurated: 1954
- Founder: Singari Shankaraiah Mudiraj
- Most recent: 2026
- Next event: 2027
- Attendance: 3-4 million (2026)
- Budget: ₹1 crore (US$100,000) (2019)
- Organiser: Sri Ganesh Utsav Committee, Khairatabad
- Website: www.ganapathideva.org

Khairatabad Ganesh is an idol of the Hindu god Ganesha (known as "Ganesh" in Hindi) that is installed during the annual festival of Ganesh Chaturthi at Khairatabad locality of Hyderabad, India. Constructed annually and known for its height and the laddu held in the figure's hand, the idol is worshipped during the 10-day festival where thousands of devotees visit every day. On the 11th day, the idol is immersed in the nearby Hussain Sagar lake.

Inspired by Bal Gangadhar Tilak, Singari Shankaraiah Mudiraj first established a 1 foot (0.30 m) Ganesh idol in 1954 at a temple in Khairatabad. The height of the constructed idol increased by one foot every year until 2014, where it reached 60 feet (18 m). The size was later reduced owing to the limitations of the route to Hussain Sagar lake and environmental concerns. The idol's peak height was 61 feet (19 m) (Note: While some sources give a higher figure of 65–66 ft (20–20 m), the organizing committee chairman S. Sudarshan Mudiraj confirmed its height as 61 ft (19 m).) in 2019, thereby becoming the tallest idol of Ganesh in India that year.

== Origins ==
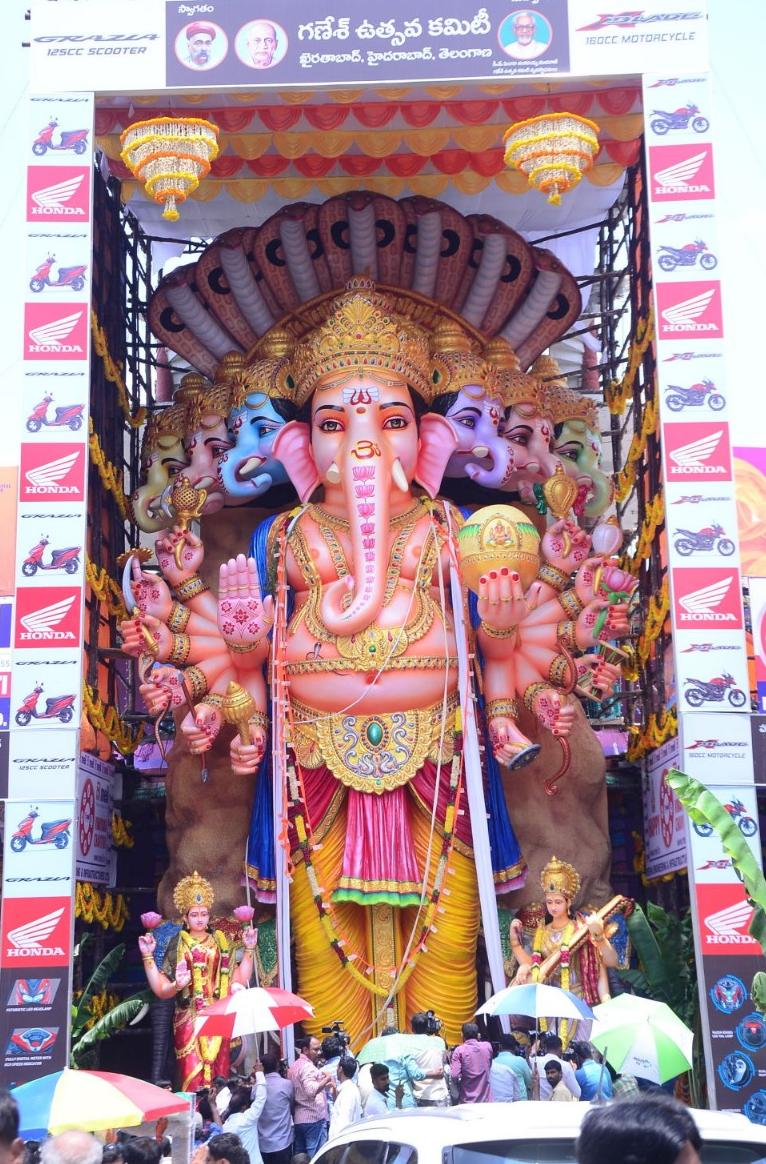
Khairatabad Ganesh in 2018.

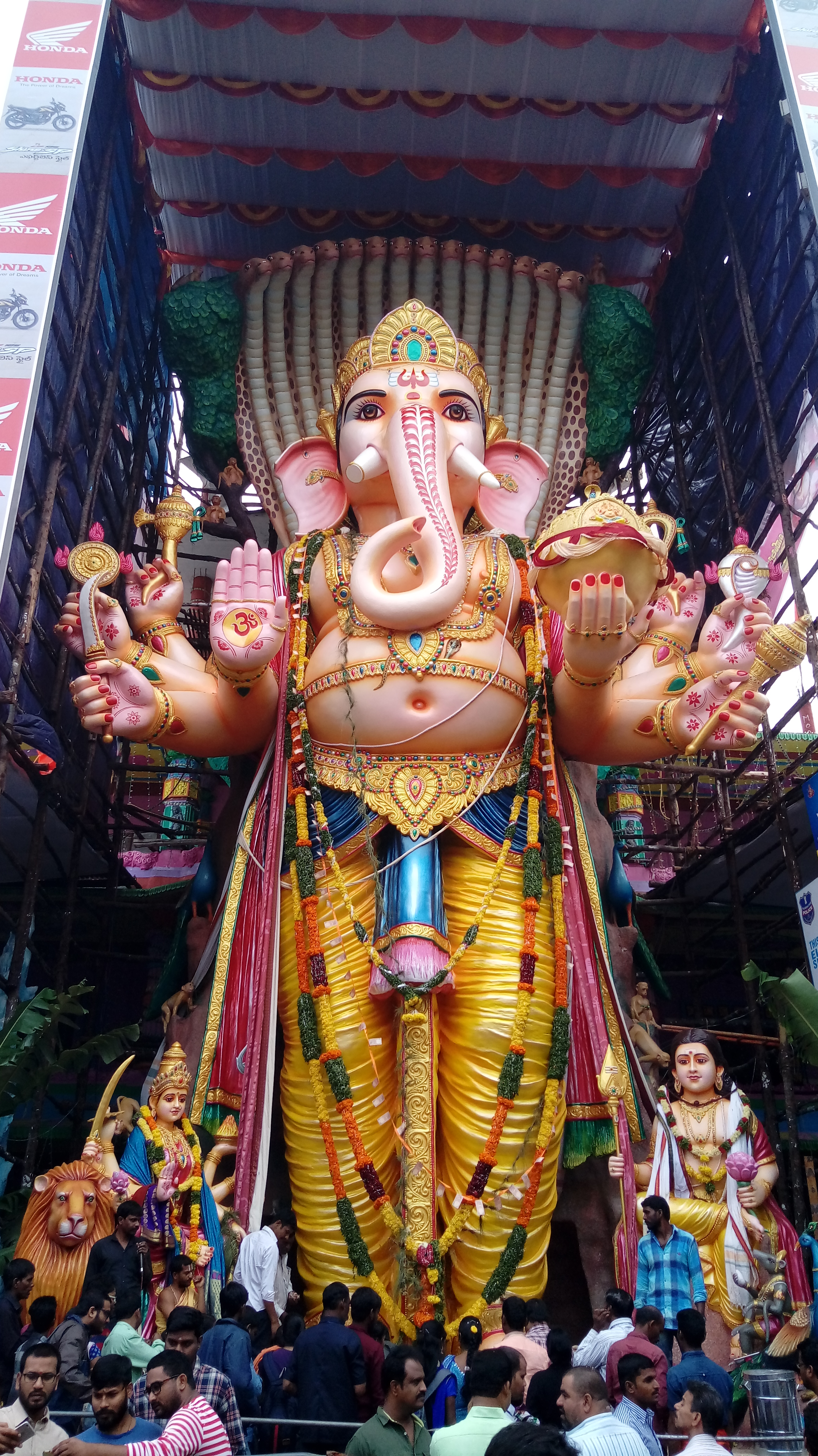
Khairatabad Ganesh in 2017.

A 1 foot (0.30 m) high idol of the Hindu deity Ganesha was first established in 1954 at Khairatabad locality in Hyderabad to commemorate the festival of Ganesh Chaturthi. It was started by Singari Shankaraiah Mudiraj , Indian independence movement activist and former corporator, who was inspired by Bal Gangadhar Tilak's call in 1893 to celebrate the festival as a mark of unity.

Devotees participate in the 10-day festival where thousands of people visit the Khairatabad Ganesh every day from various parts of the city, and other places. On the 11th day, the idol is immersed in the nearby Hussain Sagar lake.

Chinnaswamy Rajendran, who previously worked in film set designing in South Indian cinema, has been the chief architect and supervising the design of the idol since 1978. In 1978, the organizers had commissioned a backup idol to be built at Dhoolpet, a neighbourhood in Hyderabad, had Chinnaswamy unable to deliver. The idol has been placed outside the temple since 1978.

== Height ==
The height of the idol constructed increased one foot every year since 1954 until 2014 where it reached 60 feet (18 m). The organizing committee then decided to reduce the height gradually, following the High Court's order to cap the height at 20 feet (6.1 m). In 2019, the height was increased to 61 feet (19 m) due to requests from the devotees. Later height was increased in year 2024(70 feet).

== Laddu ==
The Khairatabad Ganesh is also known for its laddu, offered as prasadam. Until 2009, the Khiaratabad Ganesh Utsav committee used to place a 50 kg (110 lb) laddu at the pandal. Starting from 2010 until 2015, the laddu was offered by PVVS Mallikarjun Rao a.k.a. Malli Babu, a sweet maker from Tapeswaram, a village located in East Godavari district of Andhra Pradesh. It was made in Tapeswaram and transported to the idol location at Khairatabad, and came to be known as Tapeswaram laddu. (Note: Some sources spell it as Tapeswaram laddoo) Rao donated a laddu weighing 500 kg (1,100 lb) in 2010, which gradually increased to 6,000 kg (13,000 lb) in 2015. This is the heaviest laddu offered in the idol's history.

In 2016, the Utsav committee asked Rao to reduce the laddu weight to 600 kg (1,300 lb), citing the distribution of a large laddu to devotees as a problem. Later, Rao announced that he would not be donating laddu any further to Khairatabad, alleging that the committee had breached their contract by placing the laddu at the feet of Ganesha instead of placing it in hands as agreed before. The same year, Rao entered the Guinness World Records by creating a laddu weighing 29,465 kg (64,959 lb) which was presented to a Ganesh idol at Visakhapatnam.

Since 2016, the laddu is presented by J. Tanay Rana and his family who run an air-cooler business in Hyderabad. The presented laddu, which weighed 62 kg (137 lb) in 2016, reached 1,100 kg (2,400 lb) in 2021.

Once the puja ceremony is completed, the laddu is distributed to the devotees, ranging between 2,000 and 3,000 every year.

== Contemporary ceremonies ==
In 2013, a 59 feet (18 m) Ganesh idol was installed with the Tapeswaram laddu weighing about 4,000 kg (8,800 lb) (Note: Some sources reported the weight to be of 4,200 kg (9,300 lb)) was kept in the palm. However, the laddu was damaged due to rainfall and had to be immersed in the Hussain Sagar lake.

In 2014, the height of the Ganesh reached 60 feet (18 m), celebrating 60 years of its formation. In 2018, a 57-foot (17 m) tall idol was constructed at the cost of ₹80 lakh (US$83,000). 35 tonnes of Plaster-of-Paris (PoP), 22 tonnes of steel, 15 tonnes of clay and 500 litres of paint were used for the construction.

The 2019 Ganesh idol was the tallest idol at Khairtabad. The 61 feet (19 m) idol was constructed at a cost of ₹1 crore (US$100,000) and around 40 lakh (4 million) devotees visited the idol during the 10-day festival. It was also the tallest Ganesh idol in India that year.

A short idol with a height of 9 feet (2.7 m) was constructed in 2020 owing to the COVID-19 pandemic in India, and no devotees from other areas were allowed to visit. Devotees, however, continued to visit the idol despite restrictions. The idol was limited to 40 feet (12 m) in 2021 due to limitations of the route to the Hussain Sagar lake. The organizers commissioned a turban to be designed by experts who designed turbans for the film franchise Baahubali. The immersion event of the idol witnessed devotees ignoring COVID-19 preventive measures.

== Immersion ==
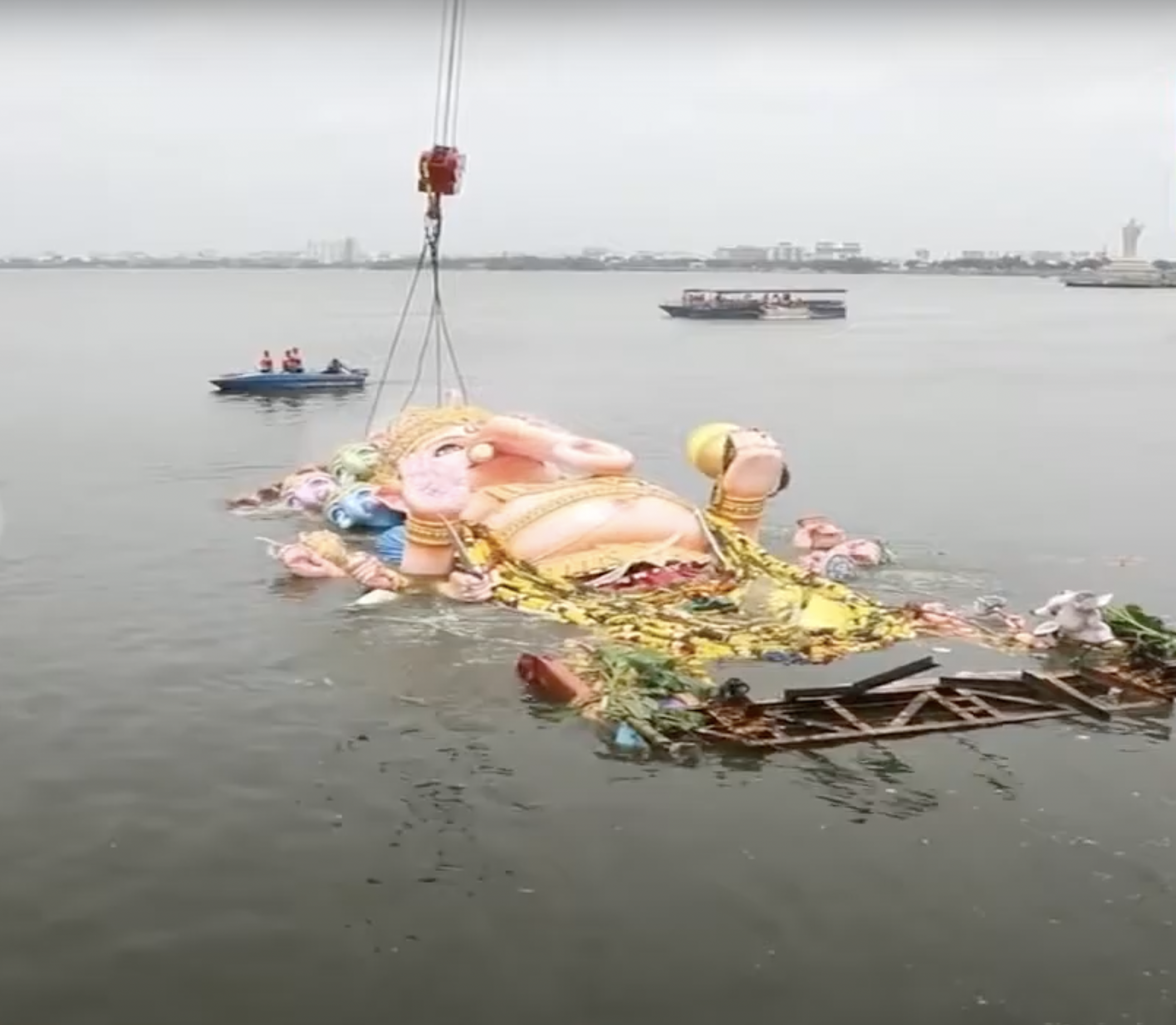
The 2019 idol being immersed in the Hussain Sagar lake

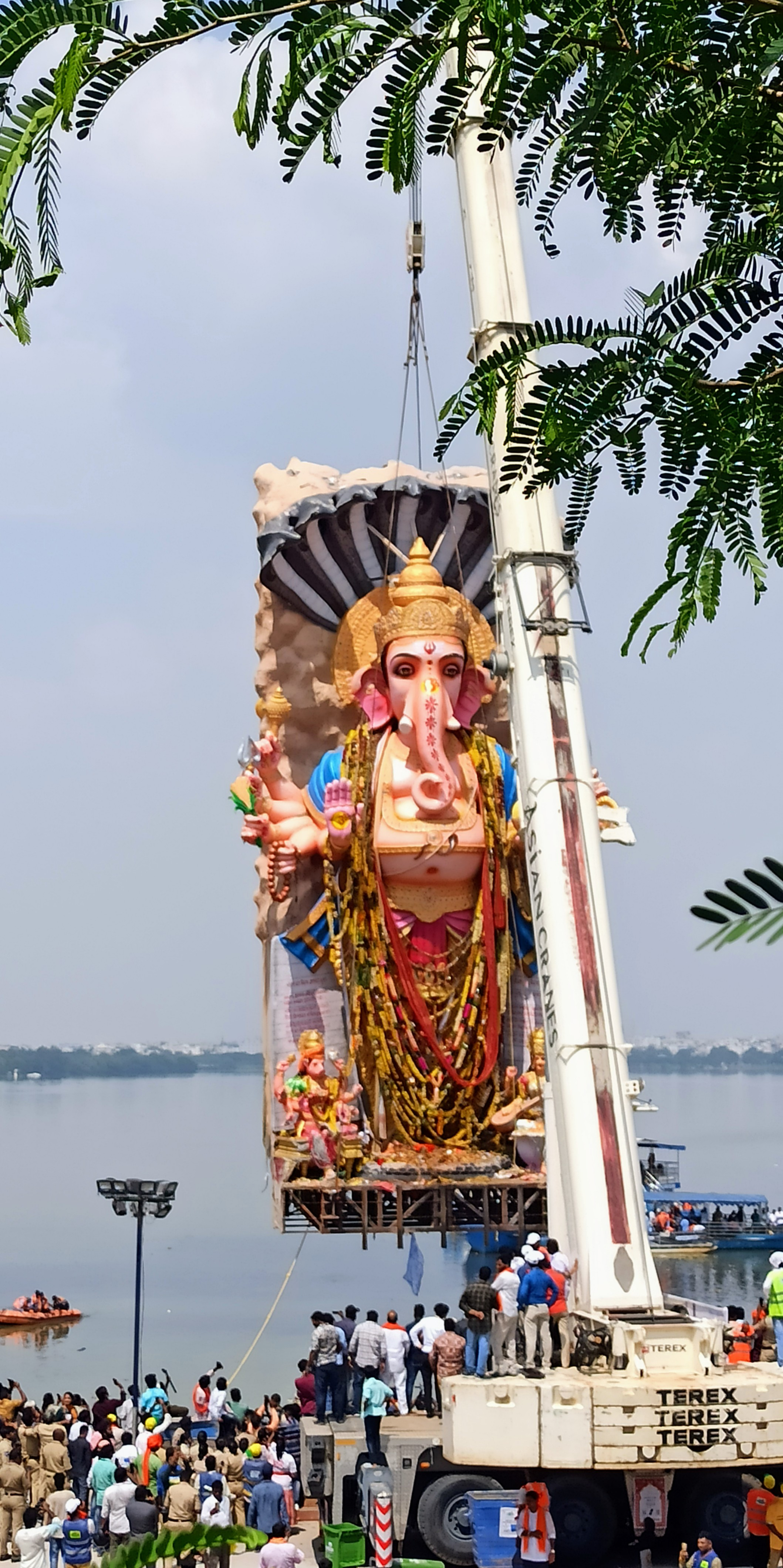
The 2023 idol being immersed in the Hussain Sagar lake

The Khairatabad Ganesh, along with several thousand other idols in the city, are immersed in the Hussain Sagar lake on the last day of the festivities. (Note: Not all idols are immersed in Hussain Sagar. In 2021, 33 lakes in and around Hyderabad were used.) The idol is taken on a shobha yatra (transl. Radiant journey), an immersion procession rally in the city. Massive trolley pulls up the idol with the help of advanced cranes from Khairtabad to Hussain Sagar. The Khairatabad Ganesh idol is taken on a direct route to the lake at Tank Bund Road, while other idols are taken in a longer procession route around the city. Once the idol reaches the lake, cranes, fitted with specialized equipment in the recent years, lift up the idol and immerse it in the lake.

The Hyderabad City Police impose preemptive traffic sanctions along the procession route. In the recent years, the police has started using technology like Google Maps to monitor the traffic. Since the construction of Hyderabad Metro in the late 2010s, the procession route had to be avoided along the railway route so as to prevent collision of the idols with the metro stations.

== List of idols ==
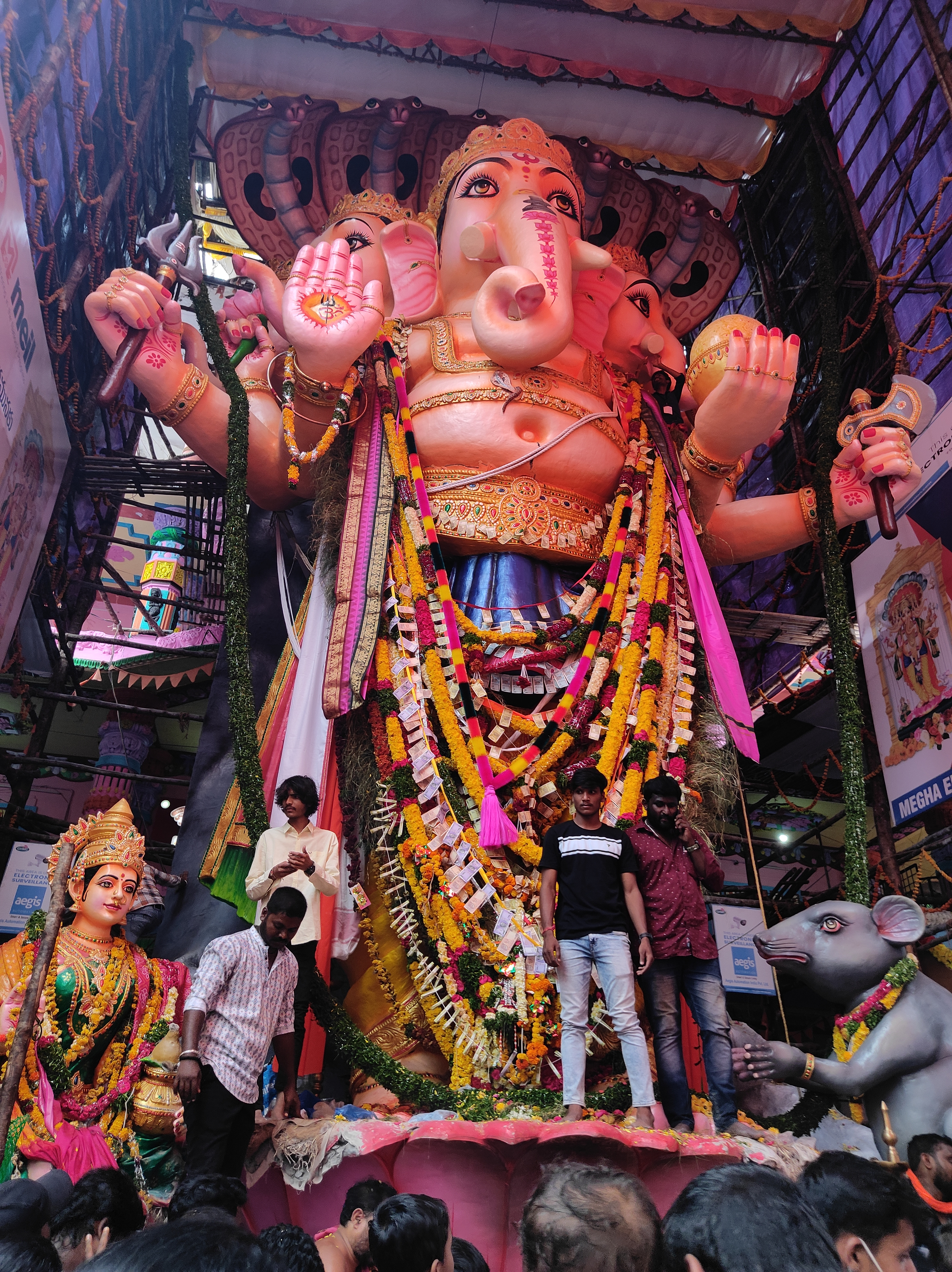
2022's Khairatabad Ganesh idol.

Each year, the committee chooses a different avatar for the idol.

Year	Avatar	Height in feet	Notes	Ref.
2013	Sri Gonaga Chaturmukha Vinayakudu	59		
2014	Sri Kailasha Vishwarupa Maha Ganapati	60		
2015	Trishaktimaya Moksha Ganapati	59		
2016	Sri Shaktipitha Shivanagendra Maha Ganapati	58		
2017	Sri Chandikumara Ananta Maha Ganapati	57		
2018	Sri Saptamukha Ganesh	55		
2019	Sri Dwadashaditya Maha Ganapati	61		
2020	Sri Dhanvantari Narayana Maha Ganapati	9		
2021	Sri Panchamukha Rudra Maha Ganapati	40		
2022	Sri Panchamukha Maha Laxmi Ganapathi	50		
2023	Sri Dasha Maha Vidya Maha Ganapathi	63		
2024	Sri Saptamukha Maha Shakti Ganapathi	70	70th anniversary, the tallest Khairatabad Ganesh.	
2025	Sri Vishwashanthi Maha Shakti Ganapathi	69		
2026	Sri Panchamukha Sankatahara Maha Ganapathi	69		

== Environmental concerns ==
In 2017, E. S. L. Narasimhan, the governor of Telangana called for construction of the Khairtabad Ganesh idol using clay and natural colours instead of the usual Plaster-of-Paris (PoP). However, the organizing Ganesh Utsav Committee expressed concerns over the clay idol as it could be damaged due to heavy rains and the plan was eventually dropped.

In September 2021, the Telangana High Court issued a ban on immersing the Ganesh idols made out of Plaster-of-Paris (PoP) in the Hussain Sagar lake due to environmental concerns. The verdict had put immersion of the 40-feet Khairtabad Ganesh in a state of limbo. The governing body of the city, Greater Hyderabad Municipal Corporation (GHMC), sought a stay order from the Supreme Court of India. The court allowed the immersion for the last time with an undertaking that there would be no immersion of PoP idols from the following year. Following the exemption, GHMC dug up Hussain Sagar lake, for the first time, along the shore on NTR Marg so that the idol would be fully immersed in accordance to religious beliefs.

During the same time, the organizing committee announced their plans to build a 70-foot (21 m) eco-friendly Ganesh idol made out of clay in 2022, following the request by the mayor of Hyderabad. The committee also stated that they would explore the idea of immersing the idol at the site itself, instead of taking it to the Hussain Sagar lake. The first such idol at a height of 50-foot (15 m) was made in 2022.

== Popular culture ==
Khairatabad Ganesh was featured in the K. Viswanath-directed 1983 film Sagara Sangamam where Kamal Haasan's dance sequences were shot in front of the idol.
