= Ganesh (name) =

- Gender: Male

Origin
- Word/name: India

Ganesh is a masculine given name commonly used in India and the Indian diaspora. The name is a form of Ganesha, a widely worshipped deity in the Hindu pantheon. The name has also been used as a surname. Notable people with the name include:

== Given name ==
- Ganesh (actor), Kannada language film actor
- Ganesh Asirvatham, English language teacher from Klang, Selangor
- Ganesh Baba, yogi and teacher in the tradition of Kriya Yoga
- Ganesh Chand, Fijian academic and former politician of Indian descent
- Ganesh Dutt (1868–1943), Indian freedom fighter, administrator and educationist
- Ganesh Ghosh (1900–1994), Indian Bengali freedom fighter, revolutionary and politician
- Ganesh Hegde (born 1974), Indian singer and Bollywood choreographer, from Karnataka
- Ganesh Man Singh, commander of Nepalese democratic movement of 1990 AD
- Ganesh Mavlankar (died 1956), Indian politician
- Ganesh Mylvaganam (born 1966), former United Arab Emirates cricketer
- Ganesh Naik, Indian politician
- Ganesh Patro, film writer
- Ganesh Prasad Singh (born 1947), member of the 14th Lok Sabha of India
- Ganesh Pyne, Calcutta-born Indian painter
- Ganesh Satish (born 1988), Indian cricketer
- Ganesh Shah (born 1949), Nepalese politician and Minister of Environment, Science and Technology
- Ganesh Shankar Vidyarthi (1890–1931), fighter against oppression and injustice
- Ganesh Singh (born 1962), a member of the 14th Lok Sabha of India
- Ganesh Sittampalam, the youngest person to pass an A-level in 1988 at 9 yrs 4 months old
- Ganesh Thapa, president of the All Nepal Football Association (ANFA)
- Ganesh Vasudeo Joshi, social activist and elderly guiding philosopher in the Indian freedom struggle
- Ganesh Venkatraman, a Tamil language actor

== Surname ==
- Amresh Ganesh (born 1988), Indian actor, film composer and singer, who has worked in Tamil-language films
- Babu Ganesh, Indian film actor-director, who has worked in Tamil films
- Bandla Ganesh (born 1973), Indian actor, and film producer of Telugu cinema
- Delhi Ganesh (born 1944), Indian actor who mostly acts in supporting roles in Tamil cinema
- Chitra Ganesh, an artist based in Brooklyn, New York
- Dodda Ganesh (born 1973), former Indian cricketer
- Ishari K. Ganesh (born 1966), Indian academic
- J. N. Ganesh, Indian politician
- Jai Ganesh (1946–2001), Indian Tamil film actor
- Janan Ganesh (born 1982), British journalist, author and political commentator
- Kudroli Ganesh, Indian magician
- M. P. Ganesh, (born 1946), former Indian field hockey player
- Meena Ganesh (1942–2024), Indian actress who acted mostly in Malayalam movies
- R. Ganesh (politician), Indian politician
- Savitri Ganesh (1935–1981), Indian actress, playback singer, dancer, director, and producer
- Senthil Ganesh (born 1983), Indian folk, playback singer and actor
- Shatavadhani Ganesh (born 1962), Indian practitioner of the art of avadhana, a polyglot, an author in Sanskrit
