= Ganesan =

Ganesan கணேசன்
- Romanisation: Kaṇēcaṉ
- Gender: Male
- Language: Tamil

Origin
- Region of origin: Southern India; North-eastern Sri Lanka

Other names
- Alternative spelling: Ganeshan; Kaneshan
- Derived: Ganesh
- See also: Ganesh (given name)

Ganesan or Ganeshan (Tamil: கணேசன், romanized: Kaṇēcaṉ) is a Tamil male given name. Due to the Tamil tradition of using patronymic surnames, it may also be a surname for males and females. The name is derived from the Hindu god Ganesh.

== Notable people ==
=== Given name ===
- Anayampatti S. Ganesan, Indian musician
- C. Ganesan, Indian politician
- D. Ganesan, Indian politician
- Dhanpal Ganeshan (born 1994), Indian footballer
- I. Ganesan, Indian politician
- K. C. Ganesan, Indian politician
- La Ganesan, Indian politician
- N. Ganesan (1932–2015), Singaporean football administrator
- P. Ganesan, Indian politician
- S. Ganesan, Indian politician
- S. A. Ganesan, Indian politician
- Saw Ganesan (1908–1982), Indian politician
- Susi Ganeshan, Indian film director
- Ganeshan Venkataraman (born 1932), Indian physicist

=== Surname ===
- Gemini Ganesan (1920–2005), Indian actor
- L. Ganesan (1934–2026), Indian politician
- Mano Ganesan (born 1959), Sri Lankan trade unionist and politician
- Praba Ganesan (born 1964), Sri Lankan politician
- Ramkumar Ganesan, Indian film producer
- Rekha Ganesan (born 1954), Indian actress
- Savitri Ganesan (1936–1981), Indian actress
- Sivaji Ganesan (1928–2001), Indian actor
- Suriaprakash Ganesan (born 1982), Malaysian cricketer
- V. P. Ganesan, Sri Lankan trade unionist and film producer

== See also ==
- Ganeshamoorthy
