= List of Hindu temples in the United States =

This is a list of 139 notable Hindu temples, centers, and ashrams in the United States.

== History ==
Following his famous speech at the Parliament of the World's Religions in Chicago, Swami Vivekananda established Vedanta Societies in New York City and San Francisco in the 1890s. The Vedanta Society built its first temple, called the Old Temple, in North America in San Francisco in 1905. (Note: However, its website states, "In actual fact, the Temple was not in any sense Hindu—not in organization, activities, membership, architecture, or decor.") This temple has evolved into a bona fide Hindu temple. Through the 1930s and 1940s, Vedanta Societies were also established in Boston, Los Angeles, Portland, Providence, Chicago, St. Louis, and Seattle. Although the Society's membership was relatively small, it paved the way for the later rise in popularity of yoga in the United States.

Paramahansa Yogananda also came to the United States to attend a conference in 1920 and established the Self Realization Fellowship. Promoting yoga through his book Autobiography of a Yogi, he opened centers throughout the country. By the 1950s, the Self Realization Fellowship had become the most prominent Hindu organization in America. Its international headquarters Self-Realization Fellowship Lake Shrine opened in California in 1950.

The rise of counterculture of the 1960s in the United States saw the arrival of many gurus and swamis from India. The most prominent of these were Maharishi Mahesh Yogi, A. C. Bhaktivedanta Swami Prabhupada, Swami Satchidananda, Swami Rama, and Swami Muktananda. In the 1960s and 1970s, these and other teachers established centers, temples, and ashrams, many of which continue to the present day.

The Immigration and Nationality Act of 1965 facilitated a significant increase in Indian immigration. The Hindu students and professionals who immigrated in the late 1960s and 1970s often kept small altars and puja rooms in their homes. These altars became the first makeshift temples of the early immigrants. As these immigrants started raising families, they began taking active steps to preserve their culture and heritage. They formed religious communities such as the Swaminarayan Sampradaya and cultural organizations such as Bengali, Gujarati, Marathi, Odisha, Tamil, Telugu, and India Associations. Many of these associations rented halls, churches, and school auditoriums to celebrate Hindu festivals such as Diwali, Holi, and Navaratri. The religious groups often met in members' homes to study the scriptures, conduct pujas, or sing bhajans (devotional songs).

By the 1970s, the religious groups and cultural associations started working together to create Hindu "temple societies." These societies formed in metropolitan areas with large Indian American populations such as Atlanta, Boston, Chicago, Detroit, Houston, Los Angeles, New York, Pittsburgh, the San Francisco Bay Area, and Washington D.C. The goal of the societies was to create permanent temples by purchasing existing properties such as private homes, former churches, warehouses, and office buildings, or by buying land and constructing new temples "from scratch." The Sri Venkateswara Temple, Pittsburgh, inaugurated on June 8, 1977, and the Hindu Temple Society of North America in New York, consecrated on July 4, 1977, became the first Hindu temples in the U.S. built by Indian immigrants. In the 1980s and 1990s, temples were built in nearly all major metropolitan areas.

In the 21st century, Hindu temples have been established in many smaller cities and towns, and larger metropolitan areas have continued to add temples, as seen in the list below. In the meantime, older temples have been expanded and/or renovated to include kitchens, dining areas, community halls, and auditoriums to meet the growing needs of their congregations.

== List of temples ==
Locations of all temples having coordinates may be seen together in a map linked from "Map all coordinates using OpenStreetMap" on the right of this page.

- Note: this is not an exhaustive list, only temples with reliable sources are included.

=== Alabama ===
Temple	Location	Image	Notes
Hindu Cultural Center of North Alabama	Harvest		
Hindu Temple and Cultural Center of Birmingham	Pelham; 33.329951°N 86.811822°W		Completed in 1998.
BAPS Shri Swaminarayan Mandir	Madison		

=== Alaska ===
Temple	Location	Image	Notes
Sri Ganesha Temple of Alaska	Anchorage; 61.159402°N 149.954632°W		Founded by Hindu leader Sivaya Subramuniyaswami in 1999. In current location since 2011.

=== Arizona ===
Temple	Location	Image	Notes
Maha Ganapati Temple of Arizona	Maricopa; 32.955630°N 112.118778°W		Opened in 2008.

=== Arkansas ===
Temple	Location	Image	
HANWA Hindu Temple	Bentonville; 36.336601°N 94.242534°W		Opened in 2012.

=== California ===
Temple	Location	Image	Notes
Old Vedanta Society Temple a.k.a. "Old Temple" (Vedanta Society of Northern California)	San Francisco; 37.79809°N 122.43430°W		Unique building, constructed in 1906, the first Hindu temple in the United States. The Vedanta Society of San Francisco was established in 1900 by Swami Vivekanandaji, after his attending Chicago World's Fair of 1893. At Filbert Street & Webster. Or it was developed in two stages in 1905 and 1908. Incorporating Mogul was designed by Swami Trigunatitananda and architect Joseph A. Leonard. Its towers in multiple Indian, Mogul, and Western architectural styles, "are intended to symbolize the harmony of all religions and the pointed arches and domes the upward aspiration of the spiritual seeker."
Nitya Mahima Panduranga Temple	Long Beach, California		
Malibu Hindu Temple	Calabasas		
BAPS Shri Swaminarayan Mandir Chino Hills	Chino Hills		
Balaji Temple San Jose	San Jose; 37.42386°N 121.96757°W		Opened in 2012.
Siddha Yoga Ashram in Oakland	Oakland		Established by Muktananda in 1975. Oldest Siddha Yoga ashram outside India.
Vedanta Society of Southern California, Santa Barbara Temple	Montecito; 34.44581°N 119.58020°W		Completed in 1956. Early South Indian wooden, Japanese, and Chinese architectural styles.
Vedanta Society Of Southern California, Ramakrishna Monastery	Trabuco Canyon; 37.42386°N 121.96757°W		Consecrated in 1949.
Sankat Mochan Hanuman Temple	Watsonville		
Self-Realization Fellowship Lake Shrine	Pacific Palisades, Los Angeles		Established by Paramahansa Yogananda in 1950.
Shiv Durga Temple of Bay Area	Santa Clara, California		Opened in December 2012.
Shiva Murugan Temple	Concord, California		Reconstructed in 2025.

=== Colorado ===
Temple	Location	Image	Notes
Hindu Temple and Cultural Center of the Rockies	Littleton, Colorado; 39.58577°N 104.83053°W		Completed in 2015.

=== Delaware ===
Temple	Location	Image	Notes
Hindu Temple of Delaware	Hockessin		

=== Florida ===
Temple	Location	Image	Notes
BAPS Shri Swaminarayan Mandir	Tampa		
Shree Swaminarayan Mandir	Lakeland		
Manav Mandir	Melbourne		
Shree Swaminarayan Temple	Ocala		
Shri Lakshmi Narayan Mandir Orlando	Orlando		
Shiva Vishnu Temple of South Florida	Southwest Ranches		
Hindu Temple of Tallahassee	Tallahassee		
Hindu Temple of Florida (Tampa)	Tampa		
Shree Mariamman Devi Temple	Tampa		Originally located in Town 'n' Country as Shree Mariamman Kali Temple.

=== Georgia ===
Temple	Location	Image	Notes
BAPS Shri Swaminarayan Mandir Atlanta	Lilburn		
Hindu Temple of Atlanta	Riverdale		

=== Hawaii ===
Temple	Location	Image	Notes
Kauai's Hindu Monastery	Kapaa		Temple complex consisting of the Iraivan Temple (pictured above) and the Kadavul Temple (pictured below)

=== Idaho ===
Temple	Location	Image	Notes
Boise Hare Krishna Temple	Boise		

=== Illinois ===
Temple	Location	Image	Notes
BAPS Shri Swaminarayan Mandir Chicago	Bartlett		
Hindu Temple of Bloomington-Normal	Bloomington; 40.454998°N 88.915458°W		
Hindu Temple of Central Illinois	Peoria		Opened 1999
Home of Harmony, Vivekananda Vedanta Society of Chicago	Chicago		Opened 2022
ISKCON Chicago	Chicago		Moved from Evanston to current location in 1980
Shree Ganesh Temple of Chicago	Chicago		First Hindu temple in Chicago's Little India
Hanuman Mandir of Greater Chicago	Glenview		Opened 2016
Vivekananda Vedanta Society of Chicago	Homer Glen		Established 1930. First Hindu institution in Chicago.
ISSO Shree Swaminarayan Temple Itasca IL	Itasca		
The Hindu Temple of Greater Chicago	Lemont		
Quad City Hindu Temple	Rock Island		
Shree MahaLakshmi Temple (Hindu Temple of Greater Springfield)	Chatham		Opened 2021
Shree Swaminarayan Mandir Wheeling IL	Wheeling		
Sri Venkateswara Swami (Balaji) Temple	Aurora, Illinois		

=== Indiana ===
Temple	Location	Image	Notes
Sri Ganesh Mandir	Columbus		Opened 2022.
Sri Bhaktha Hanuman Temple	Fishers		Opened 2025. First Hindu temple in suburban Hamilton County.
BAPS Shri Swaminarayan Mandir	Greenwood		
Hindu Temple of Central Indiana	Indianapolis; 39.8160°N 85.97345°W		Opened 2006. First Hindu temple in Indiana.
Tri-State Hindu Temple & Cultural Center	Newburgh		Opened 2022.

=== Iowa ===
Temple	Location	Image	Notes
Hindu Temple & Cultural Center of Iowa	Madrid		First Hindu temple in Iowa.

=== Kansas ===
Temple	Location	Image	Notes
Hindu Temple and Cultural Center of Kansas City	Shawnee Mission; 39.013117°N 94.762028°W		
Hindu Temple of Greater Wichita	Wichita		

=== Kentucky ===
Temple	Location	Image	Notes
Hindu Temple of Kentucky	Fincastle		
ISSO Shree Swaminarayan Hindu Temple	Bowling Green		Opened 2022
Shree Umiya Mataji Temple	Richmond		Opened 2023

=== Maryland ===
Temple	Location	Image	Notes
Murugan Temple of North America	Lanham		
Sri Siva Vishnu Temple	Lanham		

=== Massachusetts ===
Temple	Location	Image	Notes
Sri Lakshmi Temple	Ashland; 42.268703°N 71.442867°W		1990 completed.
New England Shirdi Sai Temple	Groton		

=== Michigan ===
Temple	Location	Image	Notes
Sri Kasi Vishwanatha Temple Flint	Flint; 43.01196°N 83.81038°W		
Parashakthi Temple	Pontiac		
Indo-American Cultural Center and Temple	Portage		
Bharatiya Temple	Troy		

=== Minnesota ===
Temple	Location	Image
Hindu Temple of Minnesota	Maple Grove	

=== Missouri ===
Temple	Location	Image	Notes
Hindu Temple of St. Louis	Ballwin		Completed 1991
Shanthi Mandir Hindu Temple and Community Center of Mid-Missouri	Columbia		Opened 2005

=== Nebraska ===
Temple	Location	Image	Notes
Hindu Temple of Omaha	Omaha		Opened 2004

=== Nevada ===
Temple	Location	Image	Notes
Hindu Temple of Las Vegas	Las Vegas		

=== New Hampshire ===
Temple	Location	Image	Notes
Hindu Temple of New Hampshire	Nashua		

=== New Jersey ===
Temple	Location	Image	Notes
Sri Venkateswara Temple, New Jersey (Bridgewater)	Bridgewater		
ISSO Shree Swaminarayan Temple Colonia NJ	Colonia		
BAPS Shri Swaminarayan Mandir Edison	Edison		Rebuilt and reopened in 2019
Akshardham (New Jersey)	Robbinsville		Largest Hindu temple in the United States
ISSO Swaminarayan Temple Weehawken NJ	Weehawken		

=== New Mexico ===
Temple	Location	Image	Notes
Neem Karoli Baba Ashram and Mandir	Taos		

=== New York ===
Temple	Location	Image	Notes
Geeta Temple Ashram	Elmhurst, Queens		
Hindu Temple Society of North America	Flushing, Queens		
Radha Govind Dham New York	Glen Oaks, Queens		
Bhakti Center	New York		
Broome Street Ganesha Temple	New York		
Vedanta Society of New York	New York		
Ramakrishna-Vivekananda Center of New York	New York		
Paranitya Narasimha Ashram and Temple	New York		Paranitya Narasimha Temple, Elmira, New York. Hindu temple and ashram inaugurated by Paramahamsa Vishwananda in 2023. Housed in a former church and monastery dating to 1940, it contains an 8-foot-3-inch (2.5 m), 3.5-ton granite murti of Paranitya Narasimha. Considered the largest Narasimha temple in the United States, it has become an important pilgrimage center for Bhakti Marga devotees and visitors from across the Americas.
Shree Divya Dham	Queens		
Sri Rajarajeswari Peetam (Sri Vidya Temple Society)	Rush		
Shree Muktananda Ashram	South Fallsburg		

=== North Carolina ===
Temple	Location	Image
Carolina Murugan Temple	Moncure	
Sri Venkateswara Temple of North Carolina	Cary	
Sri Somesvara Temple	Clyde	

=== Ohio ===
Temple	Location	Image	Notes
Athens Krishna House	Athens		
Hindu Temple of Dayton	Beavercreek		
Hindu Temple of Greater Cincinnati	Cincinnati		
BAPS Shri Swaminarayan Mandir	Columbus		
ISKCON Columbus	Columbus		Opened 1969. Oldest Hindu temple in Ohio.
Siddha Yoga Meditation Center in Columbus	Columbus		
Sri Lakshmi Ganapathi Temple	Columbus		
Vedic Welfare Society	Columbus		
BAPS Shri Swaminarayan Mandir	Dayton		
Kailasa Ohio Temple	Delaware		
Sri Venkateswara Temple of Central Ohio	Delaware		
Om Center Divya Dham	Galion		Founded by Bhutanese refugees.
Sri Saibaba Temple Society Of Ohio	Lewis Center		
Shiva Vishnu Hindu Temple of Greater Cleveland	Parma		
Bharatiya Hindu Temple	Powell		Opened 1994. Largest Hindu temple in Columbus metropolitan area.
Chinmaya Mission Columbus	Powell		
Shree Laxmi Narayan Temple	Reynoldsburg		
Hindu Temple of Toledo	Sylvania		

=== Oklahoma ===
Temple	Location	Image
Oklahoma City Hindu Temple	Oklahoma City	

=== Pennsylvania ===
Temple	Location	Image	Notes
Chinmaya Amarnath	Mars		First Shiva temple in Pittsburgh metropolitan area
Sri Venkateswara Temple, Pittsburgh	Pittsburgh		Opened 1977. Oldest Hindu temple in the United States built by Indian immigrants.
Arsha Vidya Gurukulam	Saylorsburg		Founded by Swami Dayananda Saraswati
Vraj Hindu Temple	Schuylkill Haven		Dedicated to Shrinathji, a form of Krishna

=== Puerto Rico ===
Temple	Location	Image	Notes
ISKCON Puerto Rico	Gurabo		

=== South Carolina ===
Temple	Location	Image	Notes
Hindu Temple of Charleston	Charleston		

=== South Dakota ===
Temple	Location	Image	Notes
Hindu Temple of Siouxland	Tea		Opened 2018. First Hindu temple in South Dakota.

=== Texas ===
Temple	Location	Image	Notes
Radha Madhav Dham	Austin		
Sri Guruvayurappan Temple of Dallas	Carrollton		
North Texas Hindu Mandir (NTHM)	Dallas		
Radha Kalachandji Temple	Dallas		Established 1971. Known for its Indian vegetarian restaurant.
Karya Siddhi Hanuman Temple	Frisco		
Radha Krishna Temple, Dallas	Allen		
Hindu Temple of San Antonio	Helotes		
Sri Meenakshi Devasthanam (Sri Meenakshi Temple Society)	Pearland		Inaugurated in 1982. Sole Meenakshi temple outside India.
BAPS Shri Swaminarayan Mandir Houston	Houston		
Hindu Temple of The Woodlands	The Woodlands		
DFW Hindu Temple	Irving		
Hindu Temple of Central Texas	Temple, Texas		
BAPS Shri Swaminarayan Mandir, Dallas	Irving		
BAPS Shri Swaminarayan Mandir	Frisco		

=== Utah ===
Temple	Location	Image
Sri Sri Radha Krishna Temple	Spanish Fork	

=== Virginia ===
Temple	Location	Image
Hindu Temple of Hampton Roads	Chesapeake	
Shree Swaminarayan Mandir	Chesapeake	
Durga Temple of Virginia	Lorton	
Yogaville	Yogaville	

=== Washington (state) ===
Temple	Location	Image
Hindu Temple and Cultural Center	Bothell	

=== West Virginia ===
Temple	Location	Image
Hindu Religious & Cultural Center	Morgantown	
Sri Sri Radha Vrindavan Chandra Temple and Prabhupada's Palace of Gold	New Vrindaban Community, Moundsville	

=== Wisconsin ===
Temple	Location	Image
Hindu Temple of NE Wisconsin	Kaukauna	
Sri Lakshmi Narasimha Temple	New Berlin	
BAPS Shri Swaminarayan Mandir	Pewaukee	
Hindu Temple of Wisconsin	Pewaukee	
Wisconsin Shirdi Sai	Pewaukee	

== See also ==
- Lists of Hindu temples
- List of Hindu temples in Canada
- List of Hindu temples outside India
- Hinduism in the United States
