= Hindu Temple of Wisconsin =

Hindu temple in Wisconsin, United States

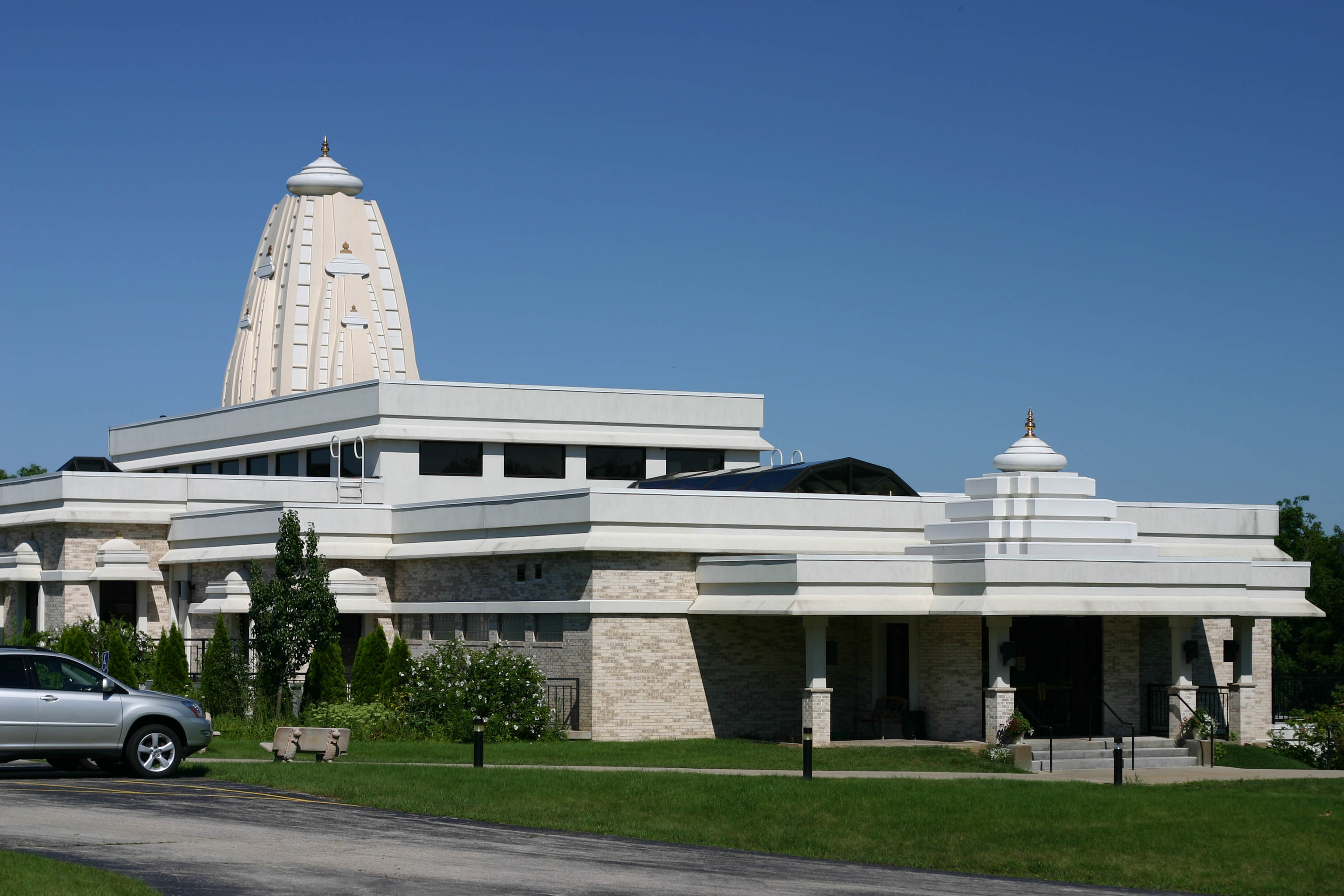
- The Hindu Temple of Wisconsin in 2010

- Location within Wisconsin Location within the United States

Religion
- Affiliation: Hinduism
- Deity: Vishnu
- Status: Active

Location
- Location: W243 N4063 Pewaukee Road, Pewaukee
- State: Wisconsin
- Country: United States
- Interactive map of Hindu Temple of Wisconsin
- Coordinates: 43°05′28″N 88°13′42″W

Architecture
- Creator: Suhas Pawar
- Established: 2002
- Groundbreaking: 1998
- Completed: 2000

Specifications
- Direction of façade: East
- Height (max): 40 feet
- Site area: 22 acres

Website
- https://www.ourhtw.org/ https://www.jainwi.org/

The Hindu Temple of Wisconsin (HTW) is the oldest Hindu temple in the U.S. state of Wisconsin, located in Pewaukee. It is attended by thousands of families. The Jain Temple of Wisconsin, the state's only Jain temple, is located on the same property.

Plans for the first Hindu temple in Wisconsin were made in the mid-1990s to serve the state's growing Indian population. They chose a rural site for its low cost and its accessibility for people across the state. The first phase of construction began in 1998 and ended in 2000; the temple held its first puja the same year. The second phase of construction was completed in 2002, when idols of deities were installed. An expansion was completed in 2016. Members of HTW established smaller temples in Pewaukee for two Hindu denominations.

The building, designed by Suhas Pawar, has two stories, each measuring 12,000 square feet. It incorporates North Indian and South Indian temple design and practices with nontraditional adaptations. Though the temple primarily honors Vishnu, its main hall has shrines to several Hindu deities popular across India.

== History ==
=== Background ===
Before HTW was established, Hindu families in Wisconsin frequently traveled to temples in Aurora and Lemont, Illinois, or met in each other's homes and basements. In 1997, there were about 1,000 Indian Hindu families in the state, which had gone up from 300 a decade earlier due to an increase in technology jobs. This population increase enabled them to build a temple in the state.

Before the 1990s, ideas to build a Hindu temple in the Milwaukee metropolitan area had not been realized. In April 1995, a group of about sixty people began plans for a temple in the area. They formed a committee in 1996 with the involvement of artists and an engineer to create a design. They visited Hindu temples in the United States and consulted a South Indian architect about designing a building for Hindu practices. Indian architect Muthiah Sthapati led the construction alongside the firm Kapur & Associates.

=== Foundation ===
The committee chose a rural location for the temple as Hindu families were spread across the state, and the cost of building in Pewaukee was lower than in Milwaukee. The City of Pewaukee approved construction in November 1997. The project faced no opposition from residents, who were glad it limited business development, and it defeated a bid for a community center. According to temple secretary Sarvesh Geddam, the location was "in the middle of nowhere" when the temple was built.

The project broke ground in 1998. On August 9, the temple held a ground blessing ceremony, following Hindu tradition, which was attended by about 350 people. The first phase of construction was completed in 2000 and cost $4.5 million. It received funds from about 400 families and $2 million in loans.

Initial plans housed the Jain Temple of Wisconsin in the same building as the Hindu temple, but Jain families raised funds for a separate temple to meet their needs for worship. It was the first Jain temple in Wisconsin and one of about 20 in the country. At the time it opened, about 40 Jain families lived in the state. The presence of the temple encouraged Jain immigrants to come to the state.

The temple held its first puja on July 7, 2000. It was attended by nearly 200 people and conducted by a priest from the temple in Aurora. A Jain ceremony was held two days later. At the time, there were fewer than 50 Hindu temples in the country and none in Wisconsin. The first board president was Kumar Iyer, an orthodontist from Brookfield.

By September 2000, the temple had performed two weddings. In March 2001, it hosted an interfaith conference featuring religion professor Anantanand Rambachan. After the September 11 attacks, it held a meeting to honor the victims, condemn racial harassment, and fundraise for the American Red Cross, which was attended by Representative Tom Barrett.

The total cost of construction was $4.7 million. After the second phase of construction was completed, the temple was inaugurated on June 28, 2002. Two days later, it held prana pratishtha and kumbhabhishekham ceremonies in which it installed idols of deities. Hundreds of volunteers set up the events and twelve priests came to lead the rituals. On June 13, 2003, a second prana pratishtha was conducted to install the final idols. The gopura was completed later.

=== Later history ===
After the December 2004 tsunami in India, the temple held a fundraiser to donate to the Association for India's Development and AIM For Seva. Along with other religious groups in Wisconsin, it provided donations and volunteers to aid victims of Hurricane Katrina. The temple's steeple was completed on July 9, 2007. By that year, temple membership had grown to 2,000 families, with over 300 attending per week.

After the 2012 mass shooting at the Sikh gurdwara in Oak Creek, Wisconsin, the temple held a vigil, attended by hundreds of people including Barrett. HTW's president, Anand Adavi, and other members visited the gurdwara. The temple completed a $2.5 million expansion in June 2016, adding 8,000 square feet and a dhvajastambha. Governor Scott Walker attended the reopening ceremony. The temple hosted vaccination clinics during the COVID-19 pandemic.

Two smaller Hindu temples in Pewaukee have been founded by attendees of HTW. Followers of the Shirdi Sai Baba movement purchased a former nondenominational Christian church, slated to be torn down, and converted it into the Wisconsin Shirdi Sai. Followers of the BAPS movement founded the BAPS Shri Swaminarayan Mandir in 2018, located in a former mattress warehouse on the same street as HTW.

As of 2023, HTW is attended by 2,500 families. The Jain temple is attended by about 60 families, many of whom also attend the Hindu temple.

== Description ==
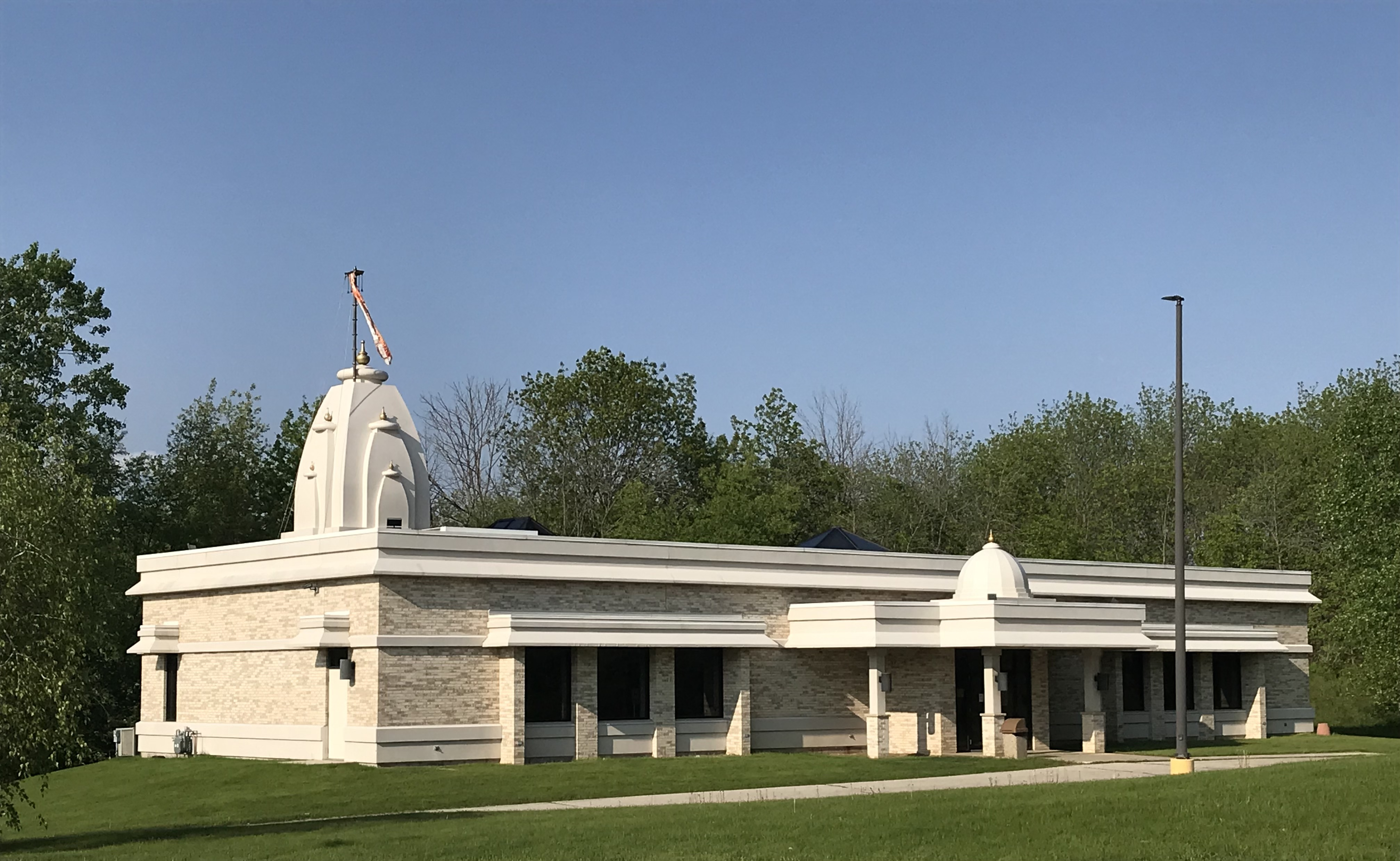
The Jain Temple of Wisconsin

The Hindu Temple of Wisconsin and Jain Temple of Wisconsin occupy a 22-acre lot at W243 N4063 Pewaukee Road (Wisconsin Highway 164), and the two temples share a parking lot. Most of the property is Wisconsin Department of Natural Resources-protected forest. It is next to the Shepherd of the Hills Lutheran Church and near a Jehovah's Witness Kingdom Hall. The Jain temple contains classrooms and a library. It is the only Jain temple in Wisconsin.

=== Design ===
The temple was designed by Suhas Pawar, an Indian immigrant based in New Berlin. He designed the temple to resemble those in India, with stone stucco walls and golden domes above the windows. His design includes a skylight above the entrance, which is not traditional. The building is 40 feet tall and has two stories, each measuring 12,000 square feet. Due to the site's topography, the main entrance is on the second floor facing west, but the main hall faces east like typical Hindu temples. The roof has two domes: one in a South Indian style and a North Indian shikhara.

The second floor has the main temple hall and a lobby resembling typical outdoor temple spaces. The first floor has a foyer and a kitchen; directly below the main hall is a community hall with a stage and space to seat 350 people. On the second-floor foyer, next to the skylight, is a bronze relief sculpture, Geetopadesh, which depicts a scene in the Bhagavad Gita of Krishna and Arjuna riding a chariot with five horses. The sculpture was designed by Pawar, his daughter Deepa, and University of Wisconsin–Milwaukee professor emeritus Narendra Patel.

The main hall is 90 feet by 60 feet. It has a homa kunda in the northeast corner with downward smoke pipes to meet fire hazard regulations. It houses eleven shrines with idols, imported from India, along with an idol of the temple's primary deity, Vishnu. The temple chose gods popular in each region of India, placing gods common in South India on the south side of the hall and ones from North India on the north side, with Vishnu in front of the entrance. These are placed on the edges of the hall, without columns obscuring them, to emulate traditional outdoor spaces for circumambulation. The shrines were designed by two pairs of brothers from a university in South India.

== See also ==
- Hinduism in the United States
- Hindu Temple of Greater Chicago, the temple in Lemont, Illinois
