= Hindu Temple and Cultural Center of the Rockies =

- Interactive map of the Hindu Temple and Cultural Center of the Rockies area

General information
- Location: 7201 S. Potomac St., Littleton, Colorado, U.S.
- Coordinates: 39.5858°N 104.8305°W
- Completed: 2015

Hindu Temple and Cultural Center of the Rockies in Centennial, Colorado is the major Hindu Temple in the Denver, Colorado region. The Hindu Society of Colorado was incorporated in 1984. During 1996-2015 the temple was located in a former church building in Littleton. The formally designed temple opened on July 3, 2015. with Prana Pratishtha on June 5–7, 2015. The temple membership grew to include 1,500 families in 2011. The temple is non-regional and non-sectarian.

== Overview ==
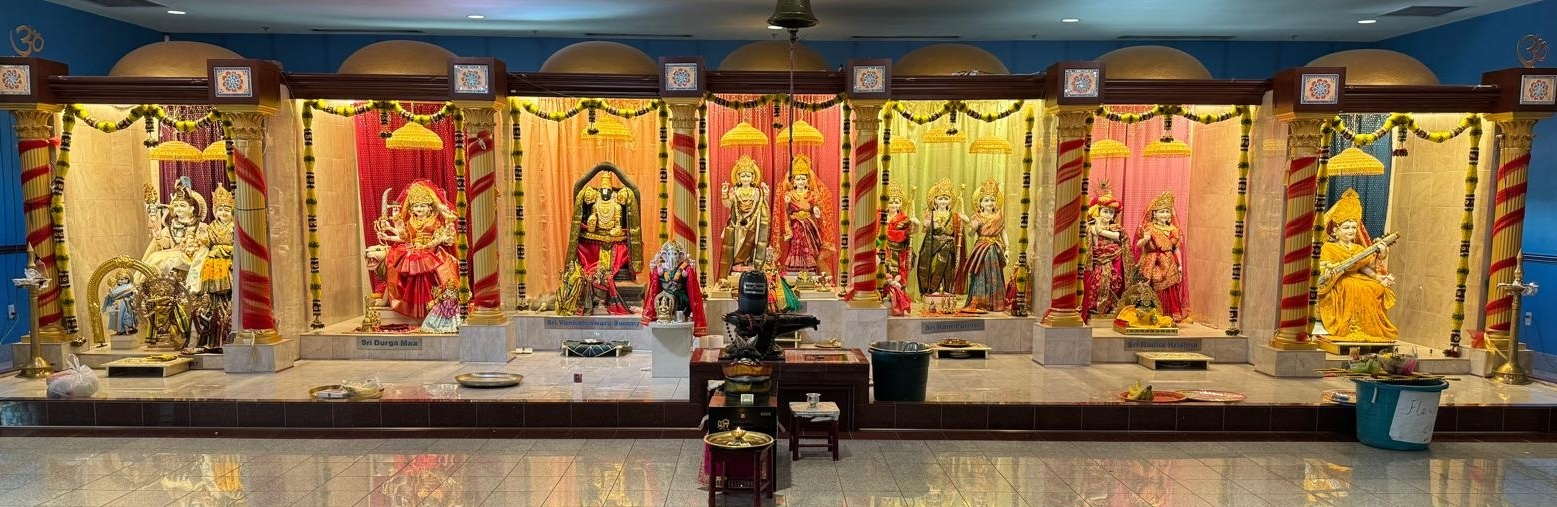
Hindu Temple of Denver, Main shrines

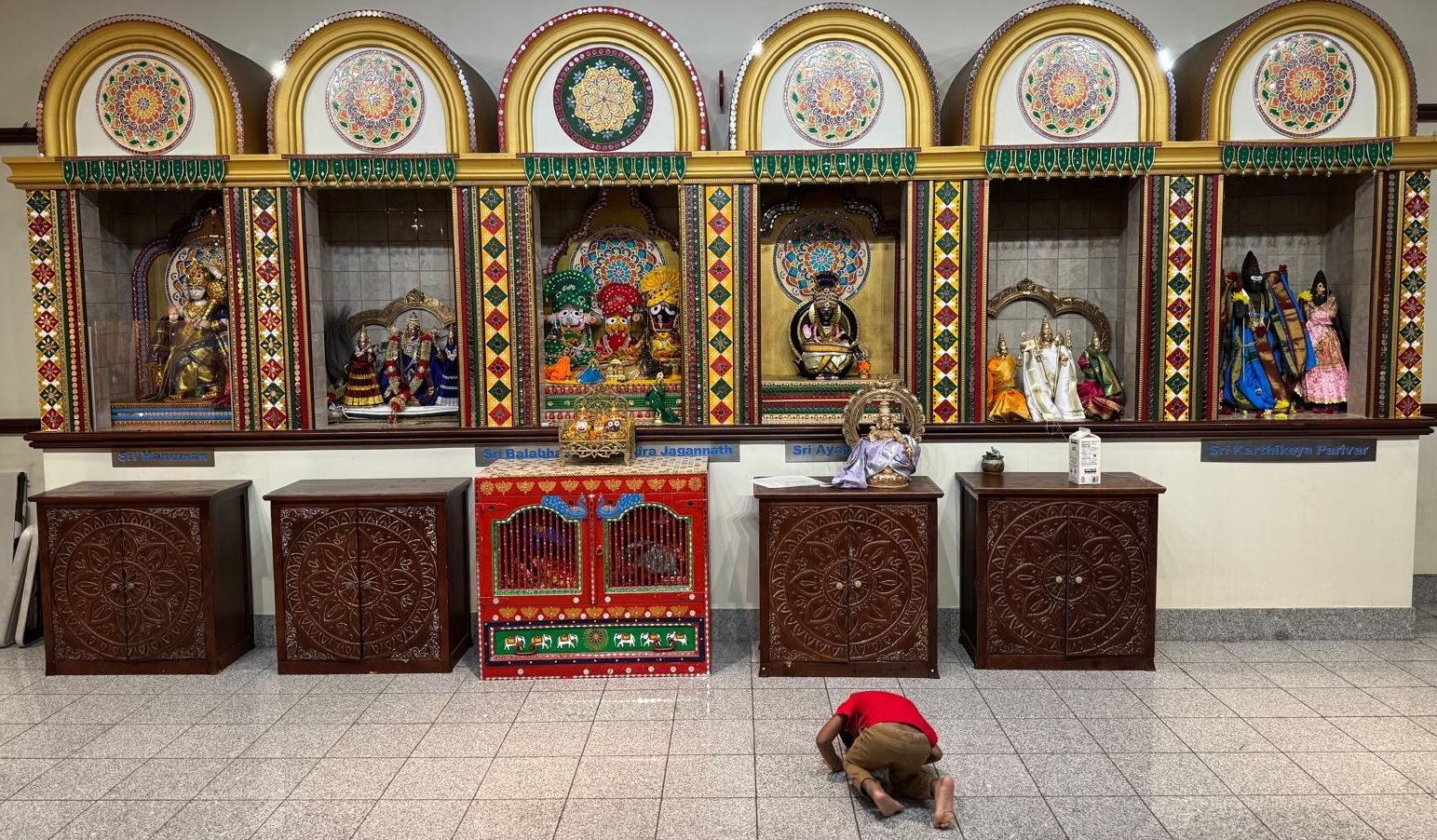
Hindu Temple of Denver, Side shrines

The temple, on a 4.25 acres (1.72 ha) property, is located on a hill with a 360 degree view of the mountains and the plains. The main floor has a prayer hall with seven shrines: Shiva Parvati, Durga, Venkateshwara (Vishnu), Laxmi Narayan (Visnu), Rama & Sita, Radha & Krishna, and Saraswati. The deities were carved in marble at Jaipur, India, except for the Venkateswara granite image was carved at Tirupati. In the front granite Shiva-Linga with Nandi and an image of Ganesha. The shrines are surrounded by a parikrama. On the other side of the hall, there are smaller shrines for Hanumana, Jagannath (with Balram and Subhadra), Ayappa, and Subramanya (Kartikeya) with Devyani and Valli.

The lower level, when fully finished later this year, will have a large multi-purpose hall with a stage and a kitchen for preparation and serving of food. The hall opens to a patio. The hall will be used as a cultural center for the celebrations such as weddings. No alcohol, tobacco or meat is allowed, in accordance with temple conventions.

== History ==
Starting in the 1960s, planning meetings were held at the residences of Dr. Tripathi, Dr. Ahuja, Dr. Gangadharam, Dr. K.C. Gupta, Dr. Vedanthan, Drs. Sagar, Nawal Sharma, and Katharine Nanda. In 1985, the Hindu Temple and Cultural Center of the Rockies was incorporated with Ved Nanda, a professor of International Law at University of Denver as the president, and the Hindu Society of Colorado was merged in it. Initially a small house was purchased in Aurora, which could accommodate about 45 people. Kauai's Hindu Monastery donated a Ganesh murti as the main deity for the Temple.

In 1996 a former church was purchased on Wadsworth Boulevard in 1996 and remodeled to serve as the temple. Some adjacent land was purchased for possible expansion, however the lot size was considered to be too small.

In 2007, 4.25 acres of land for the new temple were purchased for $500,000 in 2006 and the construction cost thus far has been about $4.5 million. Some of the donor families contributed more than $100,000. Professional contributors included the real-estate agent and the legal expert.

Priests Acharya Kailash Chandra Upadhyaya (1998) and later Pandit Raghavendra Iyer (2006) were invited to serve.

== 2015 Prana Pratishtha ==
Nine Hindu priests, seven of whom came from all over the United States, and two local ones, conducted the Prana Pratishtha (infusion of life) ceremonies. Hundreds of local Hindus from the Denver participated in the official opening of the new temple.

Both Pandit Raghavendra Iyyer and then Kailash Chandra Upadyay retired from the temple in 2016. The HTCC invited applications from potential priests and developed criteria based on skills in Sanskrit/English/Indian languages, Music, computing, and experience as a temple archak and a purohit for sanskaras in India/overseas. The new priests are Acharya Shiv Kumar Mishra and Pundit Deepak Raghunath.

== Temple Finances ==
The temple currently has a building loan of $2.25 million requiring a monthly mortgage payment of $13,600. The temple seeks to build a building fund of $200,000. which will allow the temple to refinance and significantly reduce the monthly payment. The temple still needs to construct a kitchen for the food distribution. A hall and stage are needed for temple programs and community celebrations such as weddings, birthdays, anniversaries.

== Advisory Council and Management Committee ==
The temple has instituted an advisory council with eight Legacy Donors (more than $100,000 total donation), thirteen sponsors (more than $25,000 donation), and 26 patrons (more than $10,000 donation). The Management Committee consists of thirteen individuals.

== Schedule and Festivals ==
The temple is open for visitors Monday-Friday 09:30 AM – 01:30 PM and 05:30 PM – 08:30 PM. During it is open from 09:00 AM – 09:00 PM.

Among the many festivals in the Hindu calendar, there are the major celebrations held at the temple (exact dates are determined using the traditional Indian calendar): The daily schedule for each festival is determined separately.

- New Year Ganesha Puja (January)
- Maha Shivaratri (March)
- Sri Rama Navami (April)
- Graduation Puja (June)
- Ratha Yatra” to honor Lord Jagannath (June)
- Krishna Janmastami (August)
- Ganesh Chauturthi (September)
- Maha Chandi Havan & Diwali (November)
- Diwali Celebration (November)

== Services for the yajamana ==
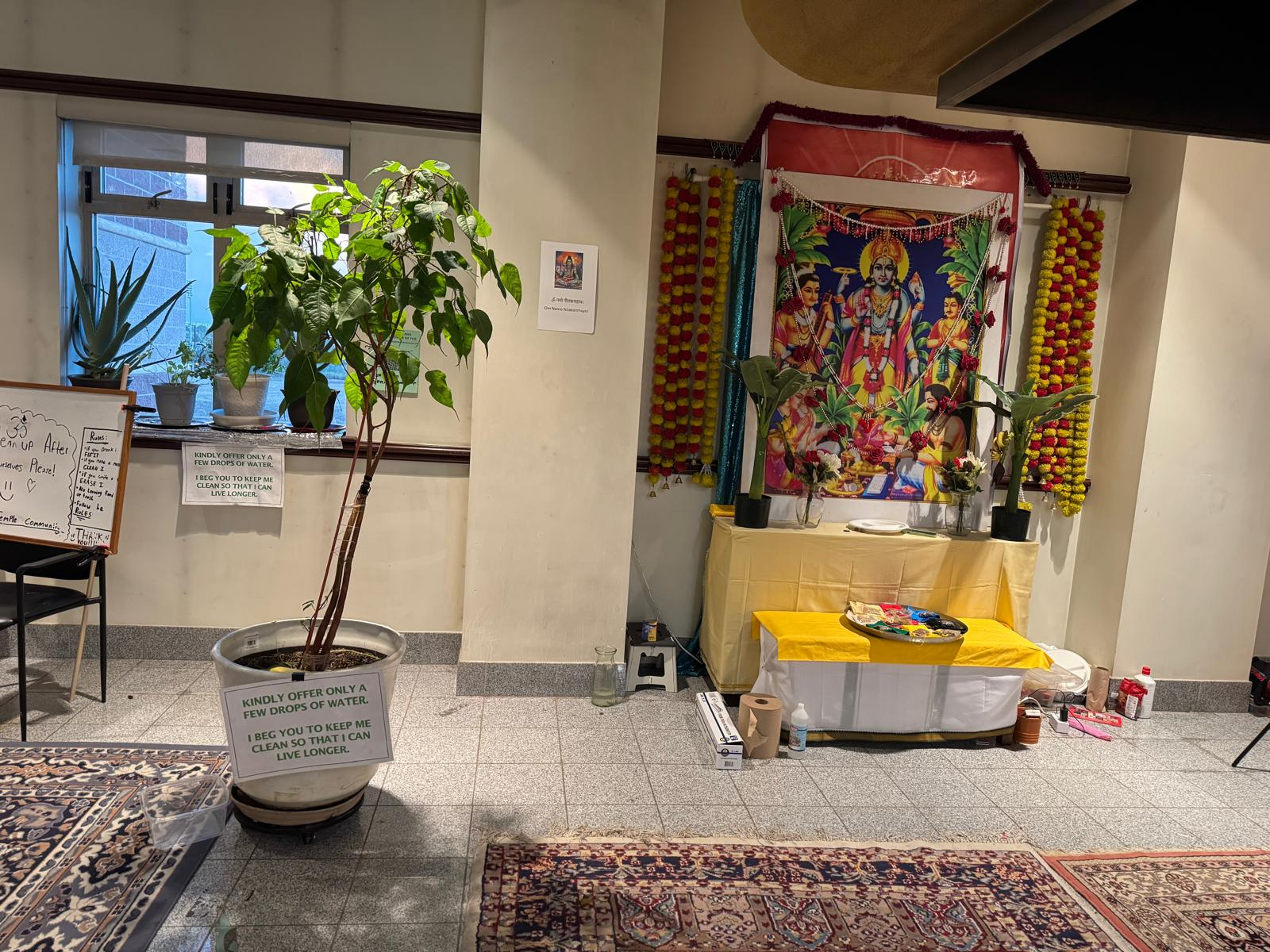
Denver, HinduTemple, Lord Satyanarayan altar, sacred Peepal plant

The temple priests provide religious services to the yajamanas, both as the temple as well as in the nearby region. These include pujas, sankaras (such as Wedding) and functions such as Grahapravesh. The temple publishes a list of recommended donations and charges, the yajamanas may provide additional dakshina to the priests.

The temple provides facilities for community use. These include a learning center for teaching regional languages for children, a conference room (25 – 30 people), and a walk-out basement space for functions of up to 400 individuals with a stage and a vegetarian kitchen.

== Inclusive character of The Denver Hindu Temple ==
Unlike many other temples, Hindu Temple and Cultural Center of the Rockies made a deliberate decision to include diversity. Venkateshwar is Vishnu as represented in the Southern tradition at Tirupati, Laxmi Narayan is Vishnu as represented in the Northern tradition (see Laxminarayan Temple), Jagannatha is the presiding deity of Jagannath Temple, Puri which represents the Eastern Tradition. Ayappa is popular in Kerala and Subramanya (Murugan or Kartikeya) is popular in Tamil Nadu.

While most devotees are Hindus of Indian origin, Hindus of other origins and non-Hindus are welcome at the temple.

== Location ==
The temple is located 7201 S. Potomac St. Centennial, Colorado, in Denver area.

== Other Temples in Denver region ==
- Radha Krishna Temple (ISKCON tradition), Cherry St, Denver, incorporated on October 25, 1976.
- Sri Venkateswara temple (South Indian tradition), Castle Rock, 2007
- Shiva Sai Mandir, (American Hindu tradition) S Pennsylvania St, Denver, 2003
- Sanatan Mandir, Cultural and Community Center (Nepali tradition), Brighton, Colorado, 2007
- Shri Shirdi Saibaba Temple of Rockies, Centennial, 2010
- Tri-State/Denver Buddhist Temple, Lawrence St, Denver, 1916
- SGI-USA Denver Buddhist Center, Speer Blvd, Denver, 1989
- Vietnamese Buddhist Congregation, Iliff Ave, Denver, 1987
- Lao Buddhist Temple of Denver, Dover Street, 1981
- Colorado Singh Sabha Sikh Temple, Commerce City, 1980
- Sikh Dharma of Colorado (Yogi Bhajan tradition) - Guru Amar Das Niwas, Baseline Rd, Boulder, 1981
- Haidkhandi Universal Ashram & Lakshmi temple, Crestone CO, 1986
- Sri Shambhavananda Eldorado Mountain Yoga Ashram, Boulder, 1991
- Neem Karoli Baba Ashram and Hanuman Temple, Taos, New Mexico, 1979
- Drala Mountain Center (formerly Shambhala Mountain Center), Red Feather Lakes, 1971
- Jain Samaj of Colorado (JSOC), Centennial, 2026
- Shri Digambar Jain Temple of Colorado, Parker, 2026

== See also ==
- Hinduism in America
- Hindu Temple Society of North America
