= Hindu Temple and Cultural Center of Birmingham =

- Location in Alabama Hindu Temple and Cultural Center of Birmingham (the United States)

Religion
- Affiliation: Hinduism

Location
- Location: Pelham, Alabama
- State: Alabama
- Country: United States
- Interactive map of Hindu Temple and Cultural Center of Birmingham
- Coordinates: 33.329951°N 86.811822°W

Architecture
- Completed: 1998

Website
- bhamhindutemple.org

The Hindu Temple and Cultural Center of Birmingham is a Hindu Temple located in Pelham, Alabama. It serves the Hindu population of the Birmingham Metropolitan Area

== History ==
Hindus did not start immigrating to the Birmingham area until after the Immigration and Nationality Act of 1965 was passed, allowing non-European immigrants to come to the United States. Most Hindus would practice their religion in the rooms of other people's homes. By 1990, the Hindu population had grown tremendously and with the creation of the Hindu Temple of Atlanta, many Hindus desired their own permanent location to worship. Dr. Santosh Khare, a doctor who immigrated in 1972 to practice medicine at Cooper Green Mercy Hospital, created the Hindu Temple and Cultural Center of Birmingham organization in 1993 and oversaw a fundraising campaign to raise over $1 million for the construction of the temple. In 1998, the temple was opened to the public after extensive construction and designing. It is estimated over 1,000 Hindu families now call the Birmingham Area home, the majority of whom live in Hoover and Pelham.
