= Hindu Temple of Minnesota =

Hindu Temple of Minnesota (HSMN)
- Location in Minnesota

Religion
- Affiliation: Hinduism

Location
- Location: Maple Grove
- State: Minnesota
- Country: United States
- Interactive map of Hindu Temple of Minnesota (HSMN)
- Coordinates: 45.146346°N 93.511142°W

Architecture
- Completed: June 2006

Website
- www.hsmn.org

Hindu Temple of Minnesota is a Hindu Temple located in Maple Grove serving the over 40,000 Hindus in the Minneapolis Metropolitan Area. It has a floor space of over 43,000 square feet, making it one of the largest Hindu temples in the United States. It has the capacity to accommodate up to 5,000 people at one time.

== History ==
The Hindu Temple had its first major renovation in 1979 under the direction of Mr. Arun Shirole, and the first murti of Ganesha donated by Drs. Kumud & Sashikant Sane was installed in 1983. Many statues continued to be donated in subsequent years. The Hindu Temple was vandalized in April 2006 during a $9 million Temple construction to build 21 mini temples. Currently, the temple is planning to develop an adjacent 60 acre agricultural land for community use such as senior housing, condos, staff quarters, school solar energy farm and a yoga retreat center. Hindu Temple of Minnesota has 7 full time priests headed by Chief priest Ronur Murali Bhattar since 2007.

== See also ==
- List of Hindu temples in the United States
