= Maha Ganapati Temple of Arizona =

- Location in Arizona Maha Ganapati Temple of Arizona (the United States)

Religion
- Affiliation: Hinduism

Location
- Location: Maricopa
- State: Arizona
- Country: United States
- Coordinates: 32.955630°N 112.118778°W

Architecture
- Completed: 2008

Website
- www.ganapati.org

Maha Ganapati Temple of Arizona is a Hindu temple located in Maricopa, Arizona. It is one of many temples that serves the Hindu Population of the Phoenix Metropolitan Area. It is also within two hour driving distance from Tucson, Arizona. Nestled in a remote location away from the traffic it offers a quiet location for the devotees. The temple is part of Harvard University Pluralism Project, a project dedicated to cataloging all Religious bodies in the United States.

Although Maha Ganapati is the main feature of this temple, it houses multiple altars for many of the popular Hindu deities. In addition to daily pujas/services it offers special services marking major Hindu holidays.

== History ==
In 1999, Satguru Sivaya Subramuniyaswami of Kauai Aadheenam gifted a 1,400 lb, 4 ft tall statue of Ganesha as a Murti for a new Hindu Temple to be constructed in Arizona. In November 2000, The Maha Ganapati Temple of Arizona was officially established as a Non-Profit Organization and recognized as a religious organization. In 2002, 15 acres of land and a double sided trailer in Maricopa was donated to the organization by Gunnela Family. MGT Arizona later held its grand opening ceremony with 500 devotees attending. Between 2002 and 2007, $500,000 were raised for the initial phase of the project. On August 25, 2007, the groundbreaking of the 8,000 sq foot temple began. The first phase of building would be estimated to cost $1.5 million. Four Towers were constructed with the highest one reaching 26 feet. Phase 1 finished in May 2008, and a Prana Pratishtha was held for the Murtis installed. In 2010, $250,000 were raised by the 1,000 followers of the temple to construct additional murtis and towers for the temple. In 2011, four additional murtis of Hindu deities were installed and in 2012, sculptors were brought in to sculpt Indian artwork into the interior and exterior of the building. MGT Arizona attended an interfaith dialogue and religious diversity event in Chandler in 2012, reciting a prayer for the attendees. Henry Cejudo attended the event. In 2014, the temple finished sculpting its four towers with Indian artwork.
