= Sri Venkateswara Temple, Pittsburgh =

Hindu temple in Pittsburgh Metropolitan Area

Sri Venkateswara Temple
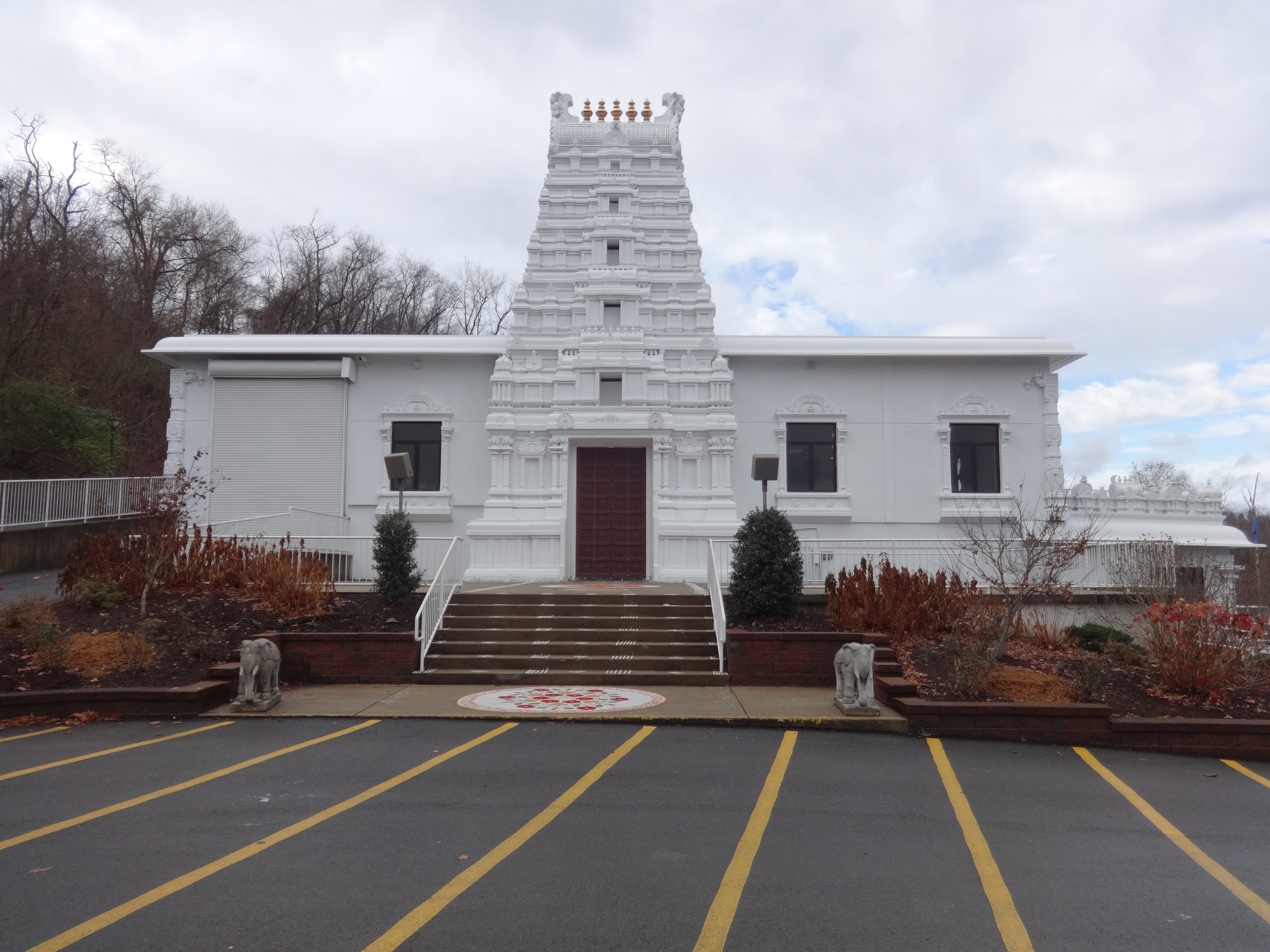

- Location in Pennsylvania

Religion
- Affiliation: Hinduism
- Deity: Venkateswara

Location
- Location: Penn Hills
- State: Pennsylvania
- Country: United States
- Coordinates: 40.441001°N 79.805182°W

Architecture
- Creator: The Endowment Department of Andhra Pradesh
- Completed: 1977

Website
- www.svtemple.org#/

Sri Venkateswara Temple, Pittsburgh is a Hindu temple in Penn Hills, Pennsylvania. It is the oldest Hindu temple in the United States built by Indian immigrants. Constructed in the style of the Sri Venkateswara Temple in Tirupati, India, the temple is a pilgrimage site for Hindus in the Northeastern and Midwestern United States. It has been described as "the trend-setting South Indian temple in its celebration of expensive, time-consuming, and intricate rituals."

== History ==
During a Pongal celebration in 1972, a group of Pittsburgh-area Hindus established a shrine with images of Hindu deities in a store basement. In the summer of that year, a granite Ganesha statue was donated to the group. Since Ganesha is worshipped before beginning an auspicious endeavor, the group saw the gift as "a good omen to invoke blessings to a larger project."

The temple's groundbreaking occurred on April 17, 1975. After the groundbreaking, tensions developed between two factions of the community: those who thought the temple should reflect South Indian traditions and architecture, and those who wanted North Indian traditions and deities represented as well. This led to a split between the factions. The North Indians constructed their own temple in suburban Monroeville, and the South Indians' temple was built in Penn Hills.

The Penn Hills temple was completed and consecrated on June 8, 1977, becoming the first Hindu temple in the United States built by Indian immigrants.

In 2005, the temple was remodeled to resemble the Sri Venkateswara Temple in Tirupati at a cost of $1.5 million.

In 2011, $15,000 in credit cards and jewelry was stolen from the temple.

== Design ==
The temple was designed by The Endowment Department of Andhra Pradesh. The temple is designed with two sides and a tower in the middle symbolizing two hands and a head. The temple operates a cafeteria as well in its basement.

== See also ==
- Old Vedanta Society Temple, San Francisco, first Hindu temple in North America
