= Shiv Durga Temple of Bay Area =

Temple in USA

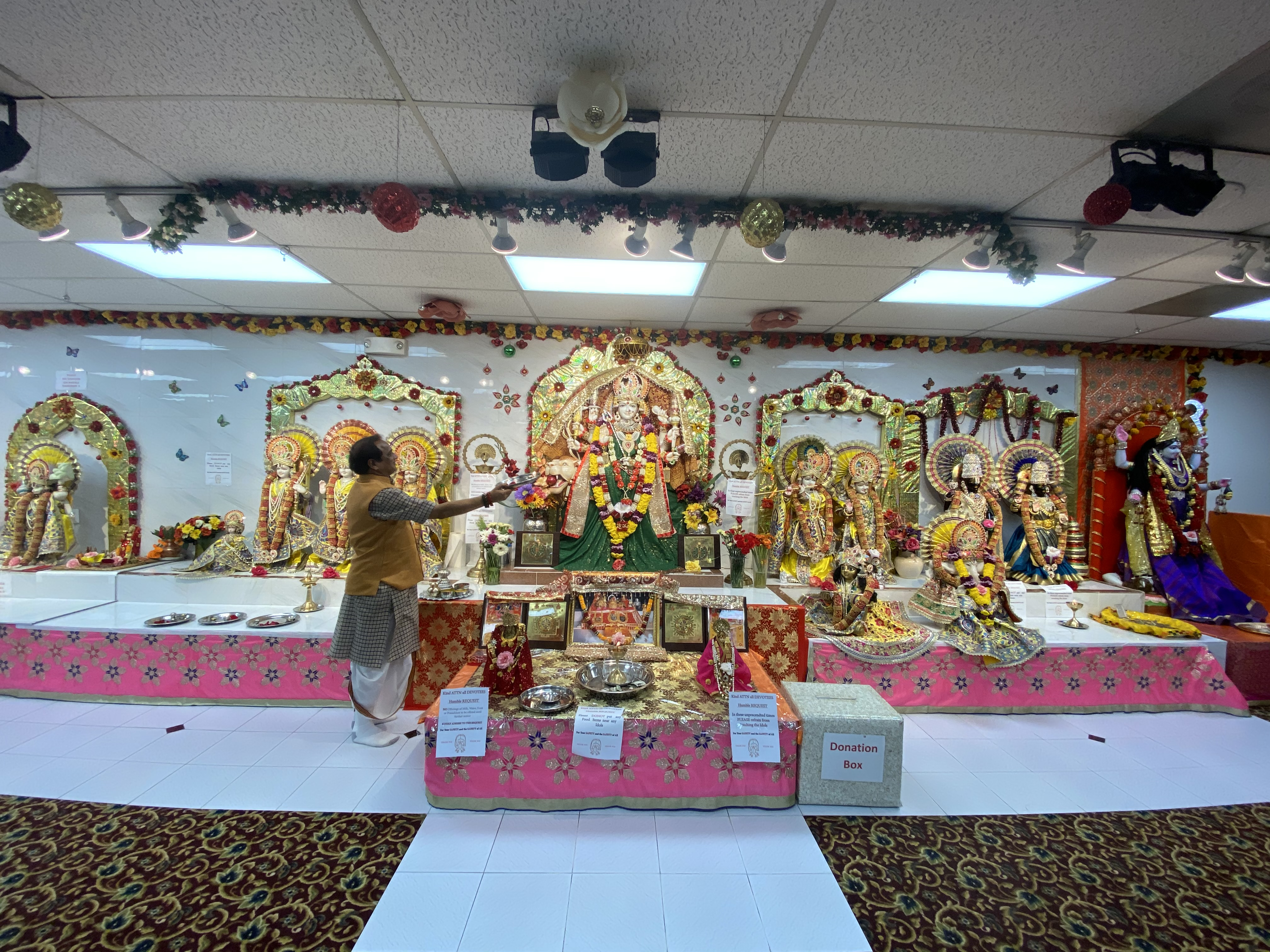

- Location within California

Religion
- Affiliation: Hinduism
- Deity: Durga, Radha Krishna, Shiva Linga
- Festivals: Holi, Navratri
- Status: Active

Location
- Location: Santa Clara
- State: California
- Country: United States
- Interactive map of Shiv Durga Temple of Bay Area
- Coordinates: 37.35326°N 121.99234°W

Architecture
- Established: 2012

Shiv Durga Temple of Bay Area is a Hindu temple in Santa Clara, California that serves the Hindu population of the San Francisco Bay Area. The temple opened in December 2012. The main deity of the temple is Goddess Durga. The temple also has idols of other deities such as Lord Ganesha, Sai Baba, Shiva Linga and Radha Krishna. The temple is visited by 100,000 Hindu pilgrims per year.

== History ==
Shiv Durga Temple was established by Pandit Krishna Kumar Pandey and his followers in Santa Clara County, California and was inaugurated on 2 December 2012. The temple set the objective of spreading Hindu culture and traditional values. Pandit Pandey is the Founder and the President of the temple. He is the temple's main spiritual and religious leader. He is an acharya (master) in Astrology and Vedic Religion. Pandit Pandey served as a priest of Vaishno Devi previously. He served as a religious leader (Dharma Guru) in the Indian army for 18 years and was awarded with Bharat Gaurav Award and Mahatma Gandhi Samman for his religious, spiritual and social services.

Shiv Durga Temple was established in dedication to Pandit Jasraj, Ashok Singhal and Tripti Mukherjee. In late 2015, the temple moved to Kern Avenue, Sunnyvale. In June, 2021, the Shiv Durga Temple moved to Flora Vista Ave. in Santa Clara.

== Festivals and activities ==
Shiv Durga Temple of Bay Area is open for visitors. The temple holds weekly aarti, kirtan, religious discourse and community kitchen. The major festivals in Hindu calendar are celebrated. Hindi classes and Yoga sessions are part of activities of the temple. Annual festivals include

- Maha Shivaratri (March)
- Sri Rama Navami (April)
- Krishna Janmastami (August)
- Ganesh Chauturthi (September)
- Diwali (November)
- Diwali Celebration (November)
