= Hindu Temple of Florida =

Hindu Temple of Tampa, Florida
- Hindu Temple of Tampa, Florida
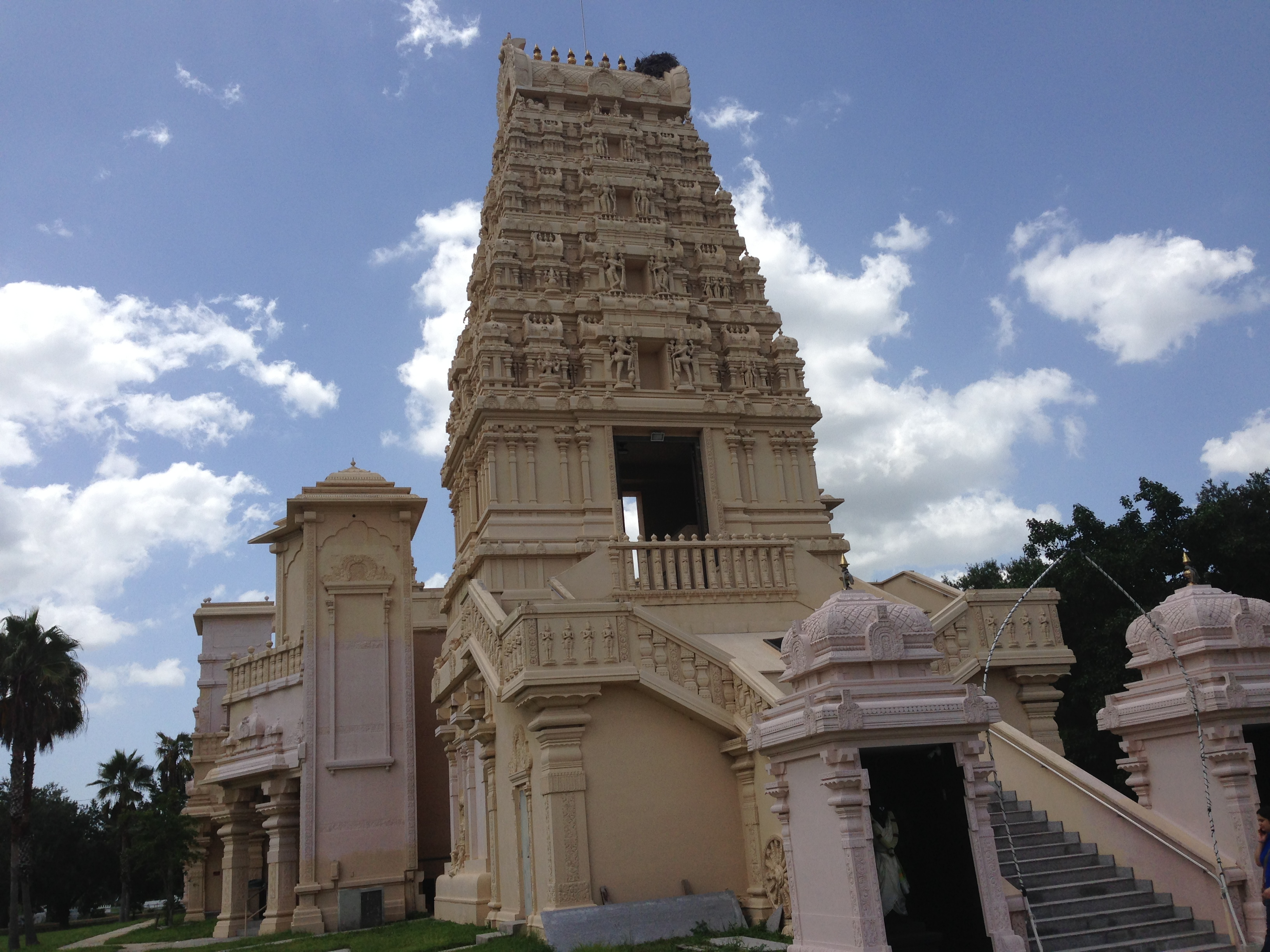

- Location in Tampa, FL

Religion
- Affiliation: Hinduism
- Festivals: Shivaratri, Vaikunda Ekadasi, Ganesha Chaturthi, Navaratri, Janmashtami, Deepavali

Location
- Location: 5509 Lynn Rd, Tampa, Florida 33624
- State: Florida
- Country: United States
- Coordinates: 28.04427°N 82.53622°W

Architecture
- Type: Modern, Hindu architectural style
- Established: 1996
- Temple: 1

Website
- http://www.htfl.org/

The Hindu Temple of Florida is a Hindu temple and cultural center in Tampa, Florida.

== History ==
In 1983, a group of Hindus residing in and around Tampa, Florida established the Hindu Temple of Florida, a non-profit organization. In 1989, the organization purchased land located ten miles north of Tampa International Airport. Construction for the temple began in 1994 and concluded in 1996. In 1996, the Maha Kumbabhishekam and the consecration of the deities was performed by a priest to commemorate the opening of the temple. Following the opening, after six years of continued construction, the intricate carvings and sculptures seen on the external facing walls of the temple were completed.

== Temple dimensions ==
The temple is 70 feet tall and 14,573-square-feet. The rajagopuram was designed and created by Muthiah Sthapathi and artists from Chennai, India.
