= Bharatiya Hindu Temple =

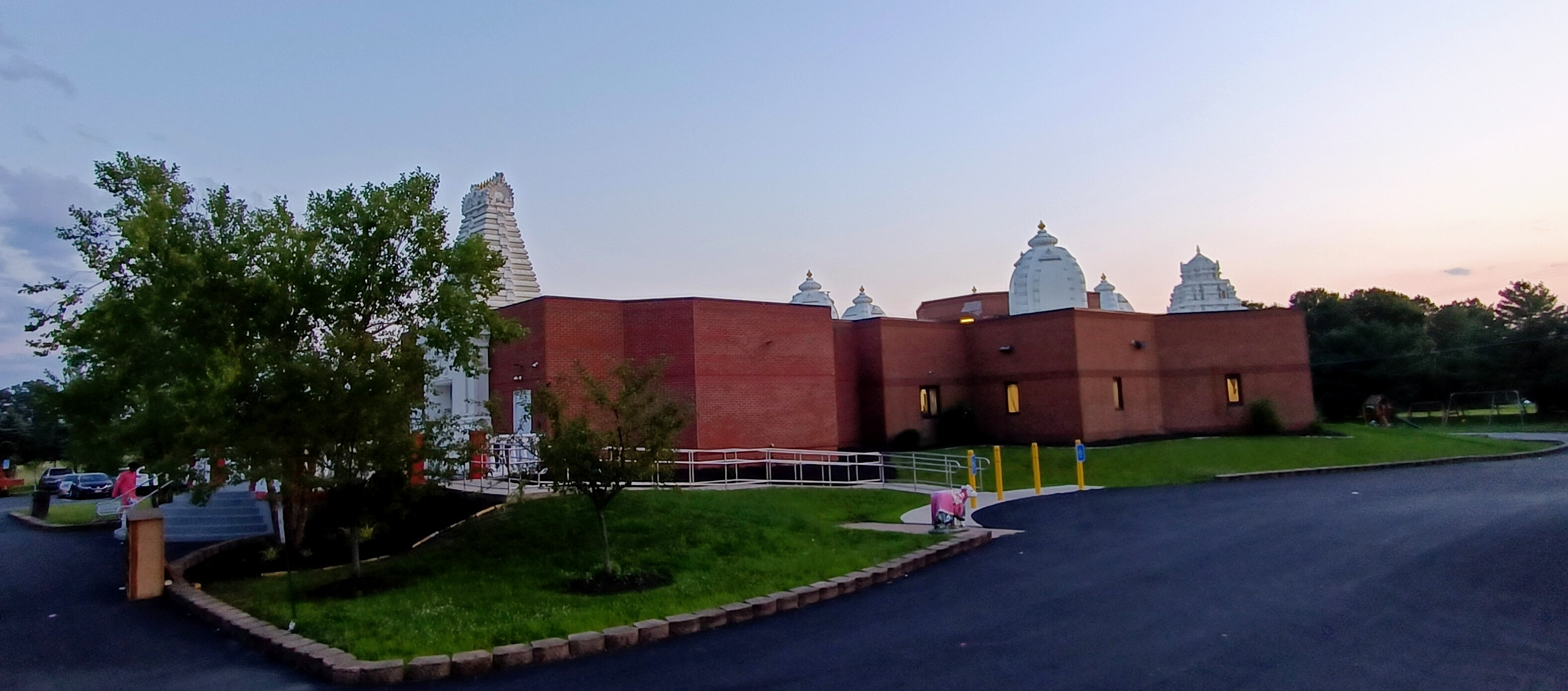
- The temple in 2023

- Location in Ohio

Religion
- Affiliation: Hinduism
- Status: Open

Location
- Location: 3671 Hyatts Road, Powell, Ohio 43065
- Country: United States
- Interactive map of Bharatiya Hindu Temple
- Coordinates: 40.21484800801615°N 83.10670255310586°W

Architecture
- Founder: The Bharatiya Temple Society of Central Ohio
- Completed: 1994

Website
- www.columbushindutemple.org

The Bharatiya Hindu Temple is a Hindu temple in Powell, Ohio. With approximately 2,000 members as of 2010, it is the largest Hindu temple in the Columbus metropolitan area. According to the Center for Folklore Studies at Ohio State University, "The temple brings new languages, new practices, new ideas, new communities, and even new foods to the Columbus area." Its significance has been recognized with an Ohio Historical Society marker.

== History ==
In 1975, Columbus resident Manu Bhatt started a weekly bhajan (devotional singing) program at his home. Attendance at this program grew to over one hundred. The group then formed a circle to study the Hindu scriptures. Interest in the study circle expanded, and in the early 1980s the group was incorporated as the Vedanta Society of Central Ohio. It started holding monthly lectures by distinguished speakers at local churches.

The lectures started drawing hundreds, precipitating a search for a permanent gathering place. In 1985, the group created the Bharatiya Temple Society of Central Ohio. It purchased an old home at 3903 Westerville Road in Columbus, renovated it, and installed Hindu deities in it. On December 6, 1985, the building was inaugurated as the Bharatiya Hindu Temple. The temple started hosting religious festivals and launched its newsletter Anjali.

In 1990, the temple hired its first full-time priest and started offering Hindi classes. Participation in temple activities continued to increase. In response to this growth, in 1991 the temple purchased twenty-two acres of land in suburban Powell. Construction of a new building on the site began in 1993. The temple moved to the new building after it was completed, and the old building was sold. The new temple was consecrated and opened to the public on July 9–10, 1994.

In 2003 the Ohio Historical Society installed a marker in front of the temple to indicate its significance.

== Architecture ==
The temple was designed by architect Shashi Patel and incorporates Nagara (North Indian) and Dravidian elements. The 8,000-square-foot, octagon-shaped brick building sits on raised ground. It has a gopuram (tower) at its east-facing entrance, a yagna (fire ritual) altar, and six shrines arranged in a circle. Each shrine houses a deity and is topped with a shikhara. The deities are:

- Ganesha, the god of new beginnings, wisdom, and luck, and remover of obstacles
- Durga, the goddess of preservation, power, energy, strength, and protection
- Krishna, the god of protection, compassion, tenderness, and love
- Shiva, the god of destruction, meditation, yoga, time, and dance
- Venkateshwara, a form of Vishnu, the god of preservation, reality, kāla (time), karma, restoration, and moksha (liberation)
- Rama, the ideal man and embodiment of dharma (righteousness)

The Venkateshwara shrine's shikhara is in the style of the Ananda Nilayam vimana of the Venkateswara Temple, Tirumala.

The temple includes classrooms, a commercial kitchen, three community halls, a library, meeting rooms, and restrooms. The temple grounds cover thirty acres and include a pond, an outdoor pavilion, priest housing, parking lots, and storage sheds.

== Administration ==
The temple is administered by an elected board of trustees. An executive committee, appointed annually by the board, oversees the temple's day to day operations, prepares an annual budget, and keeps financial and membership records.
