= HANWA Hindu Temple =

Hindu temple in Northwest Arkansas, US

HANWA Hindu Temple, Bentonville
- Location in Arkansas HANWA Hindu Temple (the United States)

Religion
- Affiliation: Hinduism

Location
- Location: Bentonville
- State: Arkansas
- Country: United States
- Interactive map of HANWA Hindu Temple, Bentonville
- Coordinates: 36.336601°N 94.242534°W

Architecture
- Completed: 2012

Website
- www.nwahindutemple.org/video.php/

HANWA Hindu Temple also known as Hindu Temple of Northwest Arkansas is located in Bentonville, Arkansas. The temple is located at 2502 SW Regional Airport Blvd, Bentonville, AR 72713.

== History ==
The land for Hindu Association of Northwest Arkansas (HANWA) was bought in 2009 and the groundbreaking began in 2011. The 4,000 Square Foot Hindu Temple opened on 29 July 2012, serving Hindu Community in the area.
