= Parashakthi Temple =

Hindu temple in USA

Coordinates: 42°39′50.2″N 83°19′12.9″W

The Parashakthi Temple, also known as the Eternal Mother Temple, is a Hindu temple in Pontiac, Michigan, United States, established in 1999 as a place of worship for devotees of Shakti, in her manifestation as Karumariamman, a South Indian Hindu goddess.

== History ==
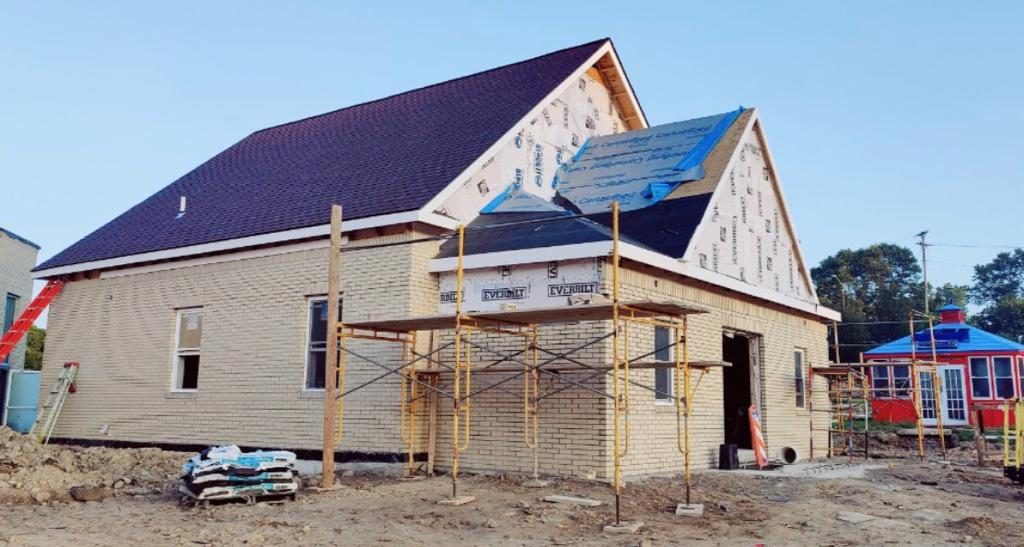
Construction on Parashakthi Temple Pontiac, Michigan

Construction of the temple began in 1998, and the temple was inaugurated in 1999. The opening ceremonies coincided with Vijayadasami.

It was originally devoted to Karumariammam, and came to also house other Hindu deities including Muruga, Hanuman, and Jagannatha. These expansions have made the temple a multifaceted center for Hindu worship for individuals with roots in various parts of India.

It is on a site occupying 16 acres (6.5 ha) in Pontiac, Michigan. The area of the temple itself is 10,000 square feet (930 m^{2}).

The temple caught fire on April 21, 2018 after an ember was removed from the memorial firebox and set fire to the roof, which was evacuated.

== Architecture ==
The Parashakthi temple is reflective of traditional South Indian style architecture, characterized by its imposing granite structures and intricately carved pillars. A prominent feature of the temple is its 54-foot gopuram (tower). The inner sanctum of the temple houses the deity Karumariammam, who is venerated as a protective and nurturing force.
