= Hindu Temple of Omaha =

Hindu temple in West Omaha, Nebraska

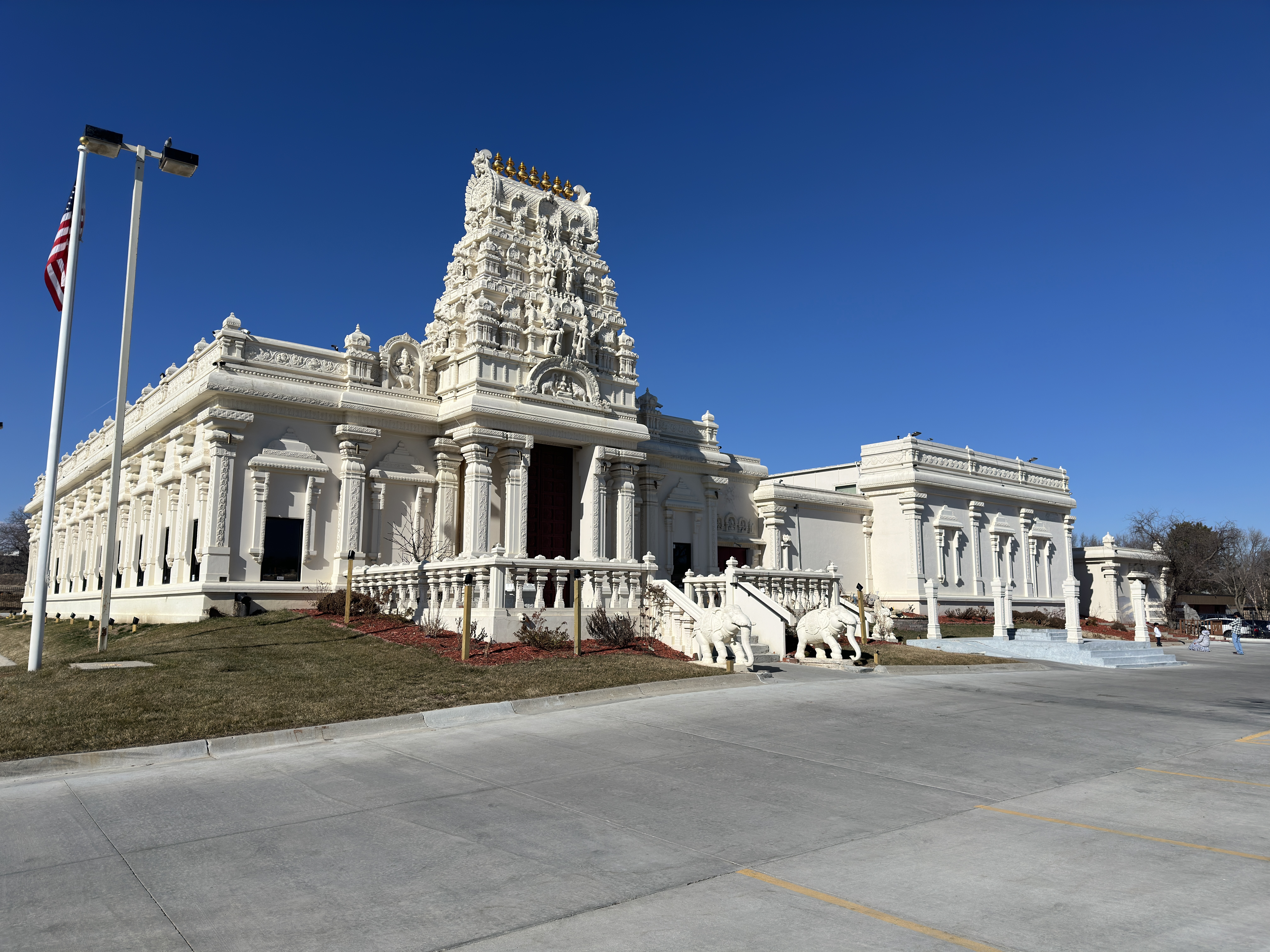

- Location in Nebraska

Religion
- Affiliation: Hinduism

Location
- Location: Omaha
- State: Nebraska
- Country: United States
- Interactive map of Hindu Temple of Omaha
- Coordinates: 41.236833°N 96.116382°W

Architecture
- Completed: 2004

Website
- hindutemplenebraska.org

Hindu Temple of Omaha is a Hindu Temple in Omaha and serves the Hindu population of the Omaha Metropolitan Area. Many members of the Hindu Temple of Omaha are in Medical, Engineering and Computer Science fields within the Omaha area. Several members are also students studying at the University of Nebraska–Lincoln and Creighton University. 98% of the member population is of Indian descent with the remaining 2% being Nepalese.

== History ==
Starting in the 1970s, Hindus started immigrating to Nebraska to be students at University of Nebraska–Lincoln and University of Nebraska Omaha to work in Engineering and Medical Fields. The demand for an area to worship, resulted in informal gatherings in homes or rented rooms at convention centers. In 1993, The Hindu Temple of Omaha was created. In November of that year, they purchased a defunct Italian restaurant was bought in West Omaha as a meeting place. After two years of work of renovation the building August 30, 2004. In 2012, HT Omaha held a prayer for the victims of the 2012 Sikh Temple Shooting with dozens in attendance.

== Design ==
After buying the abandoned Italian restaurant, the Hindu Temple hired 11 Indian sculptors to sculpt the exterior of the Hindu Temple. The total renovation and sculpting costs of the temple amounted to $1.2 Million. The temple has several pillars each adorned with a Hindu Deity. The Temple has an inner main Sanctrum that has a 2.5 Ton statue of Ganesha. The Temple also has a cafeteria, library, classroom, rooms for yoga and a prayer hall. The temple also has Sunday school classes and a youth group.

== Charity ==
Hindu Temple of Omaha has engaged in many notable charity acts such as raising $35,000 for earthquake victims in 2001 Gujarat earthquake. HT, Omaha also engages in holding an annual health fair to raise awareness of AIDS. The temple also attends several interfaith dialogues in Omaha, educating people about Hinduism and allows world religion classes to visit the temple regularly. In 2019, the Hindu Temple held a luncheon to fundraise $54,000 for the Mississippi River Floods of 2019 and presented the check to Governor Ricketts in a ceremony held at the Hindu Temple.
