= Hindu Temple of Central Indiana =

Hindu temple in Indianapolis, Indiana, US

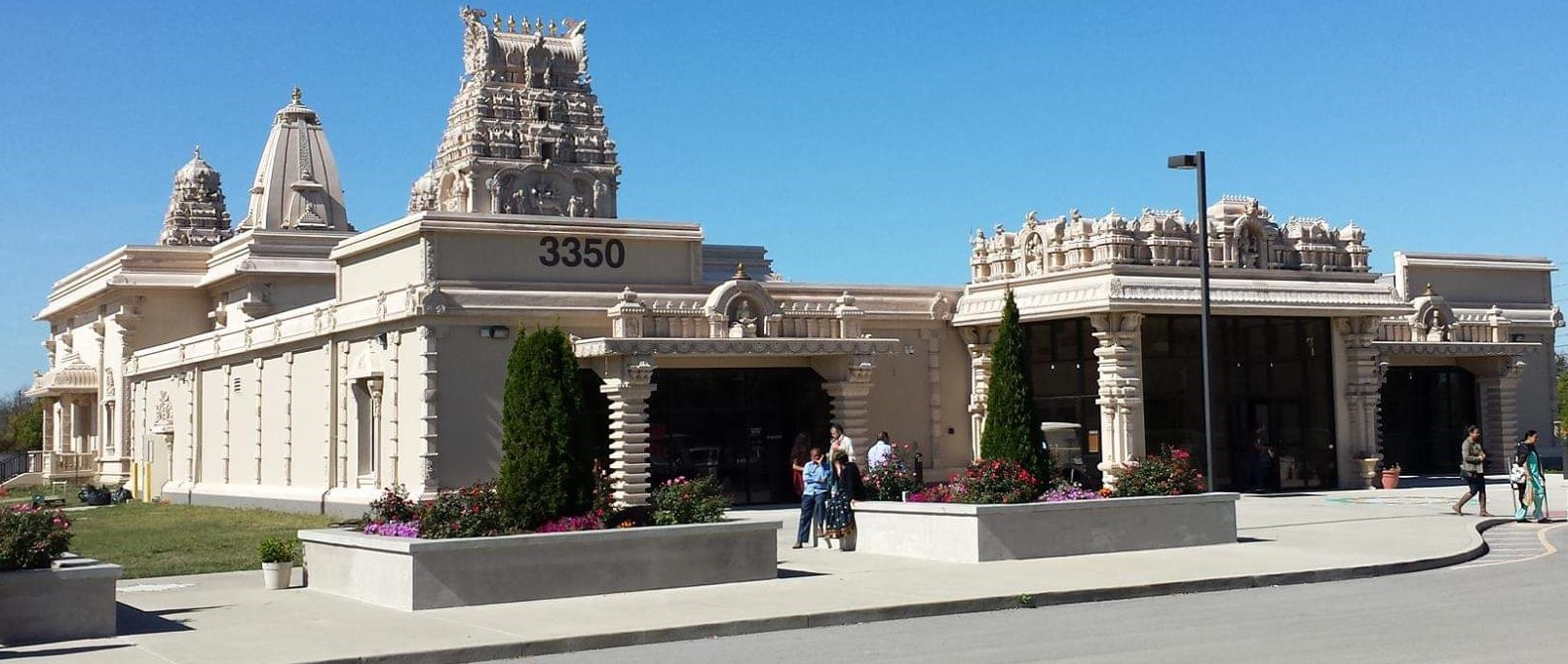
- The temple in 2015

- Location in Indiana

Religion
- Affiliation: Hinduism
- Status: Open

Location
- Location: 3350 N. German Church Rd., Indianapolis, Indiana, US
- Coordinates: 39.818597°N 85.973448°W

Architecture
- Completed: 2006

Website
- www.htci.org//

The Hindu Temple of Central Indiana is a Hindu temple in Indianapolis, Indiana, United States. It opened in 2006 and is the oldest Hindu temple in Indiana. Local public TV station WFYI calls it "a breathtaking new monument - impressive in both scope and design, as well as a testament to the growing multiculturalism of the region." The Indianapolis Star says it is "an iconic structure that pays homage to various holy shrines across India."

== History ==
From 1985 to 2006, area Hindus gathered to worship in the Geeta Mandal of Indianapolis congregation. The organization was based in the India Community Center on West 56th Street, which housed its Radha Krishna deities. It held weekly pujas, biweekly prayers and lessons, and celebrations of Hindu festivals such as Diwali. In 1999, members of the group donated money and land to construct a temple. By 2005, fueled by rapid growth in the local Indian American population, the congregation's membership had increased to approximately 800.

After five years of fundraising, construction of the temple's first phase started by 2005 on a 13-acre site on German Church Road on the city's east side at a cost of $1.3 million. Upon completion, Geeta Mandal's Radha Krishna deities were transferred from the India Community Center to the temple. On February 5, 2006, it opened to the public for worship, becoming the first Hindu temple in Indiana. On the same day, initiation ceremonies were performed to sanctify the temple and honor its deities. The inauguration was attended by hundreds. The Indianapolis Star called the temple's first phase "functional yet spartan."

In 2011, the temple held a three-day ceremony to consecrate its new Subramanya and Ayyappa deities. The event was attended by hundreds.

A $10 million expansion completed in 2015 added an 11,000-square-foot worship hall with 17 shrines, a skylight, and four carved towers. On June 3–7, 2015, the temple consecrated the new space and blessed the newly installed deities with a kumbhabhishekham. During the ceremonies, thirty priests chanted mantras and bathed the deities. Indian classical music and dance performances were held. Outside the temple, priests on cranes blessed the new towers, and a helicopter dropped rose petals and holy water on the temple as onlookers cheered and waved. The five-day event was attended by approximately 5,000.

In 2016, local public TV station WFYI aired The Temple Makers, an hour-long documentary on the temple. The program follows the temple's journey from its initial design to its inauguration. WFYI calls it "a breathtaking new monument - impressive in both scope and design, as well as a testament to the growing multiculturalism of the region."

== Architecture ==
The temple was designed by architect Umanandam Nagarat and completed by 32 stone craftsmen from India. It has an entry hall with images of Vishnu and Lakshmi. Its 11,000-square-foot worship hall has 17 shrines, some of which are modeled after famous temples in India. The worship hall has a skylight surrounded by four 99-foot carved concrete-and-mortar towers. The towers have intricate designs sculpted by the stone carvers. The temple's three main shrines (Durga, Shiva, and Vishnu) are directly under three of the towers, and the fourth tower is on top of the temple's main entrance. From inside the worship hall, the skylight has a view of three of the towers. The shrines and the worship hall's main entrance are decorated with intricately sculpted figures representing Hindu deities and animals such as peacocks and squirrels.

The temple also has a 400-square-foot ritual room, a dining area, and a basement in which Sunday school classes are held.

== Deities ==
The temple's 17 deities were made in India from granite and marble. They are:

- Ganesha, the god of new beginnings, wisdom, and luck, and remover of obstacles
- Ayappa, a South Indian deity, the god of dharma, truth, and righteousness
- Hanuman, a divine vanara companion of Rama
- Jagannath, a form of Krishna, or Vishnu
- Mahavira, a tirthankara (supreme preacher) of Jainism
- Sai Baba of Shirdi, a 19th- and 20th-century Indian saint
- Saraswati, the goddess of knowledge, music, art, speech, wisdom, and learning
- Lakshmi, the goddess of wealth, fortune, power, beauty, fertility, and prosperity
- Parvati, the goddess of power, energy, nourishment, harmony, love, beauty, devotion, and motherhood
- Durga, the goddess of preservation, power, energy, strength, and protection
- Shiva, the god of destruction, meditation, yoga, time, and dance
- Venkateshwara, a form of Vishnu, the god of preservation, reality, kāla (time), karma, restoration, and moksha (liberation)
- Rama, the ideal man and embodiment of dharma (righteousness)
- Radha Krishna, the combined feminine and masculine aspects of God
- Bhudevi, the Earth goddess
- Murugan, the god of war
- Navagraha, the nine heavenly bodies and deities that influence human life
