= Hindu Temple of Greater Cincinnati =

- Location in Ohio

Religion
- Affiliation: Hinduism

Location
- Location: Cincinnati, Ohio
- State: Ohio
- Country: United States
- Interactive map of Hindu Temple of Greater Cincinnati
- Coordinates: 39.129263°N 84.274102°W

Architecture
- Completed: 1991

Website
- cincinnatitemple.com

Hindu Temple of Greater Cincinnati or HTGC, is a Hindu Temple in Cincinnati, Ohio. It serves the Hindu Population of the Cincinnati Metropolitan Area. The address of the Hindu Temple is 720 Barg Salt Run Road, Cincinnati, Ohio 45244.

== History ==
The temple opened in May 1997, after years of planning and construction. HTGC hosted Taste Of India, a local event dedicated to various Indian Cuisine. It was the largest Indian Festival to be hosted in the Midwest at the time.
