= Hindu Temple Society of North America =

- Sri Maha Vallabha Ganapati Devasthanam
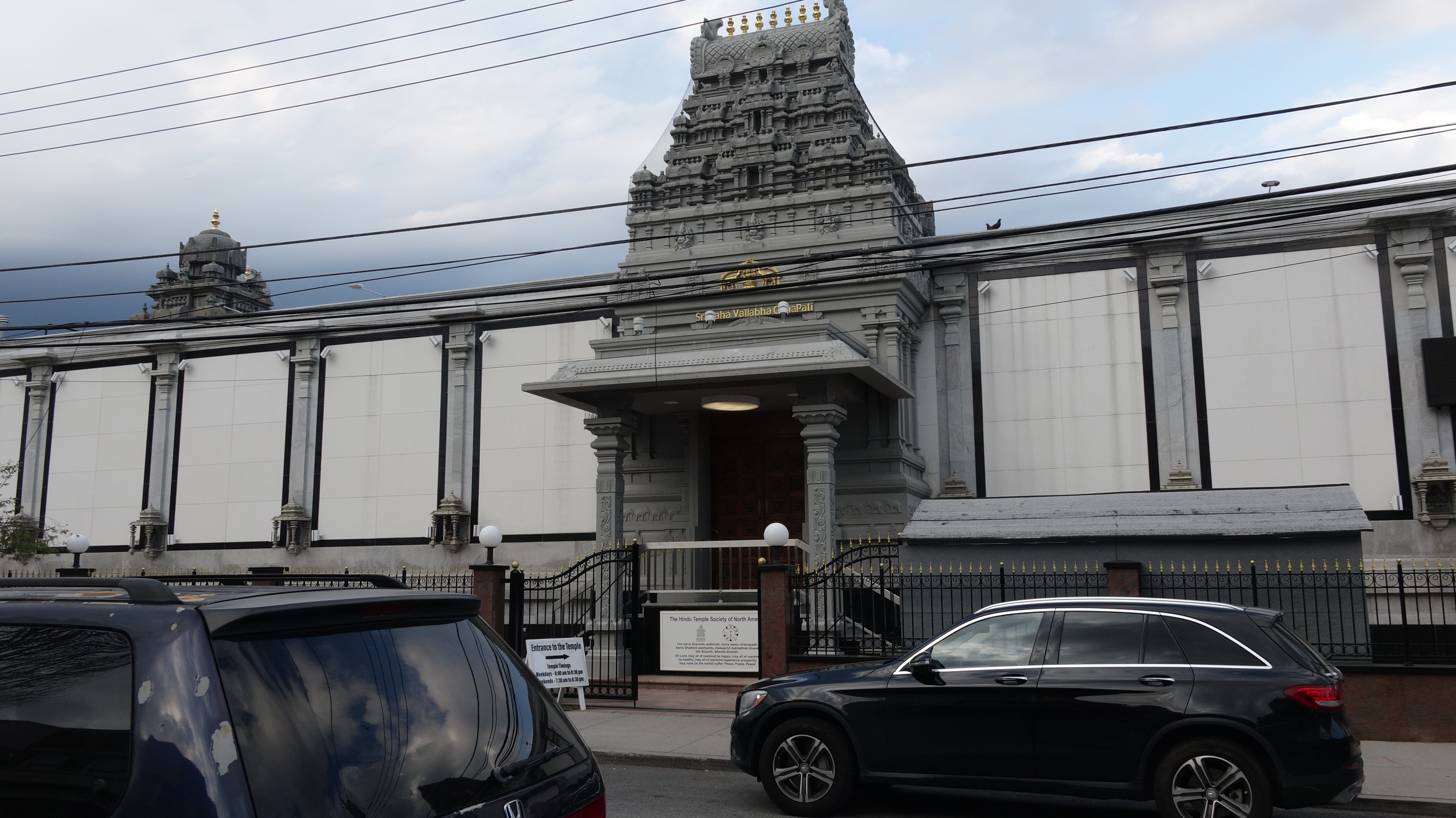
- Exterior in 2025

- Location within New York City

Religion
- Affiliation: Hinduism
- Deity: Ganesha

Location
- Location: 45-57 Bowne St, Queens, NY 11355; U.S.
- State: New York
- Country: United States
- Coordinates: 40°45′09.9″N 73°49′00.6″W

Website
- nyganeshtemple.org

The Hindu Temple Society of North America is a nonprofit organization that manages the Sri Maha Vallabha Ganapati Devasthanam temple in Flushing, Queens, in New York City. It is known as the Ganesha Temple after its main deity, Ganesha, and is the second-oldest Hindu temple in the United States built by Indian immigrants. Uma Mysorekar has served as the society's president since 1994.

== Deities ==
The central deity of the temple is Ganesha. The sacred images of Venkateswara, Lakshmi, Shiva, Parvati, Durga, Saraswati, Hanuman, Kumbha Chandikeshwara, Dhvani Chandikeshwara, Dakshinamurthy, Gayatri, Shanmukha, Valli, Devasena, Kamakshi, Navagraha, Nagendra Swamy, Navagraha, Raghavendra Swamy, Rama Parivar, Radha-Krishna, Khodiyar Mata, Ayyappan, Agastriyar, and Lopa Mudra, Satyanarayan and Rama Devi, Chandrasekaraswamy and Anandavalli, Atma Linga, Nataraja, Trishula astradeva, Ankusha Astradeva, Sivakami and Manikkavachakar, Swarna Bairavar, Sudarsana and Narasimha, Dhanvantari and Garuda, and Sridevi and Bhumi have also been consecrated within the temple.

== History ==
Before the Hindu Temple Society of North America was established in 1970, Alagappa Alagappan, one of its founders, hosted meetings for members in his living room. The organization acquired the land of a former Russian Orthodox Church and designed a traditional Hindu temple in its place. The construction was completed in 1977 and the consecration ceremony was performed on July 4, 1977. The design of the temple's exterior was inspired by the face of traditional Hindu temples found in South India.

In October 1998, the temple inaugurated the Ganesha Patasala to be used for youth activities. The patasala offers classes to youths in subjects like mathematics, linguistics, religion, bhajanams, and dance.

The temple was reconsecrated in 2009.

=== Leadership ===
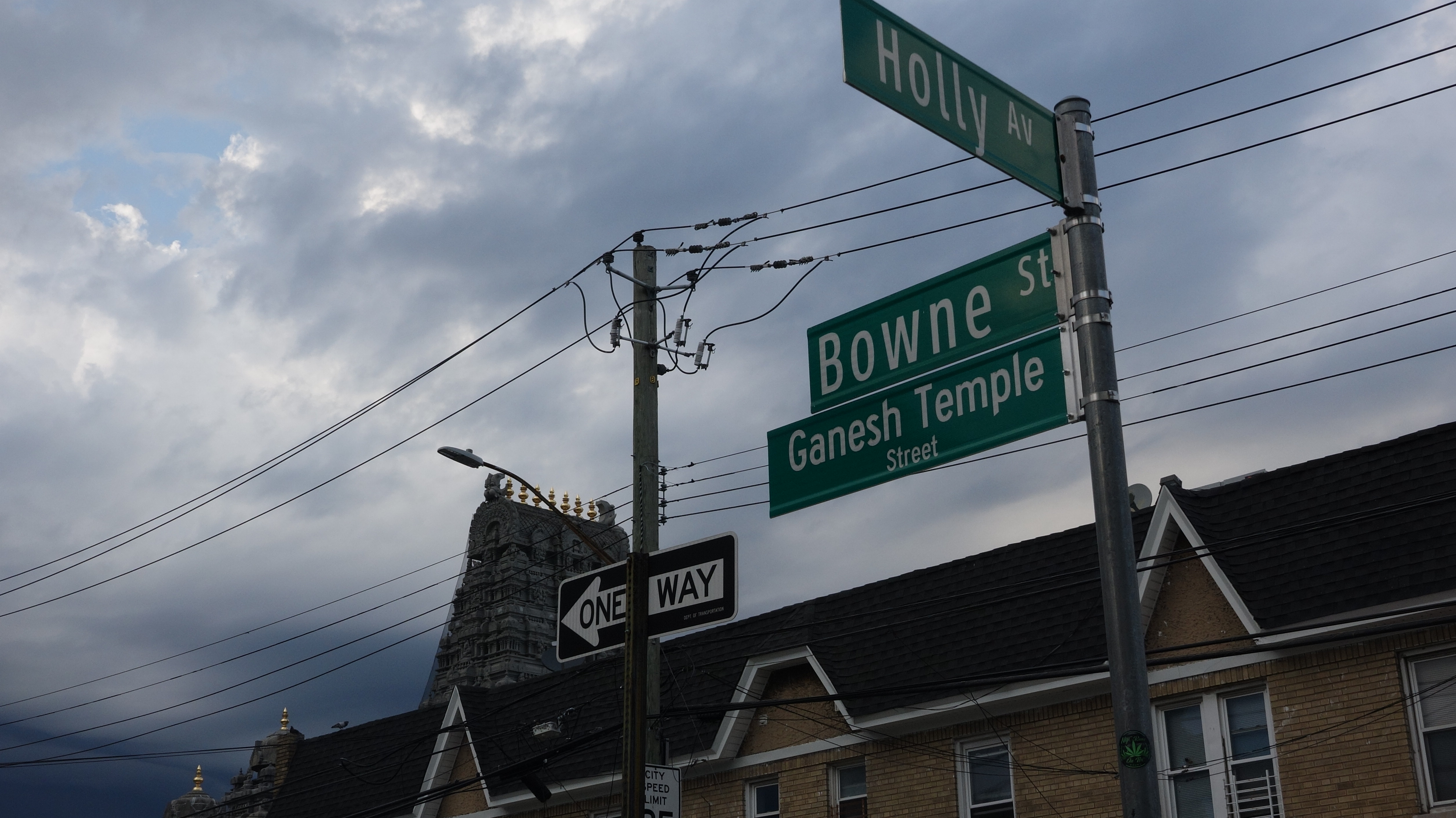
Honorary street sign recognizing the temple

Dr. Uma Mysorekar began her involvement with the temple services in the mid-1980s and has served as the president since 1994. Mysorekar graduated with a medical degree from Bombay University and practiced as an Obstetrician/Gynecologist.

Mysorekar has been awarded the Kannada Rajyotsava Award from Karnataka, Ellis Island Medal of Honor, Governor's Award of Excellence, and a "token of esteem" by the City Lore's People's Hall of Fame. She was also chosen by Barack Obama's presidential inaugural committee to join several other religious leaders in the national prayer service, on the day of his inauguration.

== Temple canteen ==
Underneath the ground level, the temple houses a vegetarian restaurant called the Temple Canteen. The Temple Canteen was established in 1993. The canteen feeds 4,000 people a week, with as many as 10,000 during the Deepavali (Diwali) holiday.

== Dispute ==
At the Hindu Temple Society of North America, a dispute arose in 2003 regarding the leadership of the temple. Six plaintiffs expressed that the temple was being run too autocratically, and wanted the opportunity to vote for a board of trustees. The temple trustees believed that the plaintiffs questioned the leadership because they wanted to gain control of the temple, themselves. Ultimately, judge Joseph Golia ruled that a referee would facilitate an election for a new board of trustees. After the first election, the board of trustees that served the temple previously were re-elected.

== Miracles ==
In September 1995, the Ganesha drinking milk miracle was observed at the temple. It was reported that "People held the spoon filled with milk under the trunk, by the mouth, and the milk would be taken up".

== See also ==
- Hindu denominations
- Hinduism in the West
- Indians in Queens
- List of Hindu temples in the United States
- Sanskrit in the West
- List of Hindu empires and dynasties
