= Hindu Temple of Oklahoma =

Hindu temple in Northwest Arkansas, US

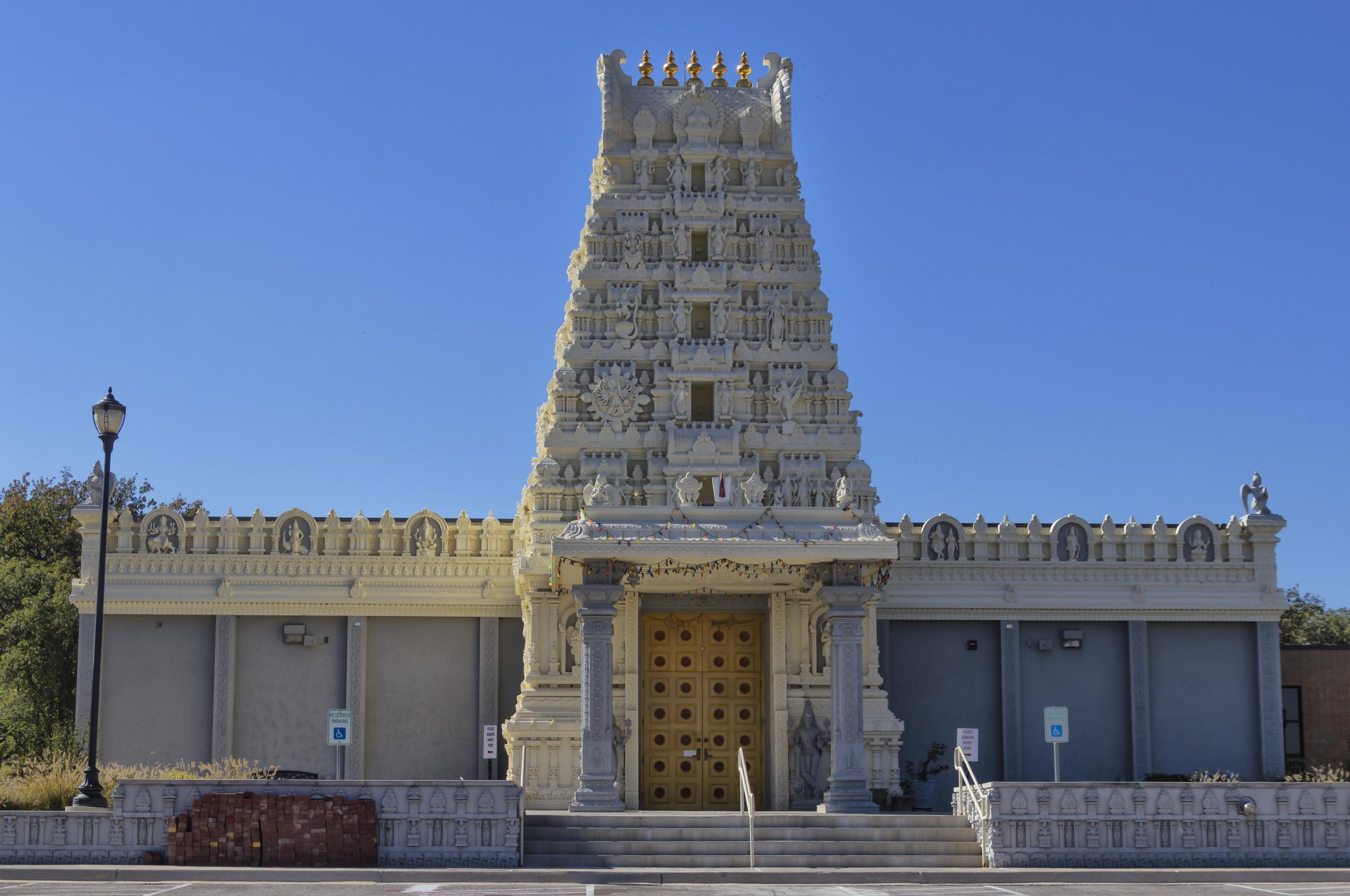

- Location in Oklahoma

Religion
- Affiliation: Hinduism

Location
- Location: Oklahoma City
- State: Oklahoma
- Country: United States
- Coordinates: 35.544888°N 97.441037°W

Architecture
- Completed: 1989

Website
- www.hindutempleokc.org

The Hindu Temple of Oklahoma is a Hindu temple located in Oklahoma City, Oklahoma.

== History ==
In 1989 a 4,000 square foot Hindu temple was built in Oklahoma City to serve the 1,000 hindus that lived in the Oklahoma City Metropolitan Area at the time. The temple celebrates Diwali.
