= North Texas Hindu Mandir =

- Location in Texas

Religion
- Affiliation: Hinduism

Location
- Location: Dallas
- State: Texas
- Country: United States
- Interactive map of North Texas Hindu Mandir
- Coordinates: 32.860669°N 96.705475°W

Architecture
- Completed: 1992

Website
- www.northtexashindumandir.org

North Texas Hindu Mandir (NTHM), is a Hindu Mandir in Dallas, Texas and is one of the many Hindu Temples located in the Dallas-Fort Worth Metroplex. Its located on 10309 Baronne Cir, Dallas, TX 75218.

== History ==
In 1992, Indo-Caribbean Hindu Immigrants in the Dallas-Fort Worth Area established CHANT, Caribbean Hindu Association of North Texas. In 2002, CHANT purchased an old synagogue in the Old Lake Highlands Neighborhood of Dallas. They repainted the interior and installed several Hindu Murtis and in 2002, it opened as a non sectarian Hindu Temple for Hindus from all over the world. On April 15, 2015, several members of Mara Salvatrucha vandalized the temple by drawing '666' on the Temple doors and various symbols of Devil Worship were sprayed on the walls of the Temple. In response, the Hindu Temple installed several cameras around the premises and a fence around the temple to prevent further attacks from happening in the future.

== Design ==
Due to the influence of various Hindu Groups from around the world, the Hindu Temple's interior has Hindu Deities in a line along the wall, barely raised above the floor. There are no pedestals so devotees can touch the Murtis.

== Charity ==
NTHM's Youth Group facilitates various drives for charities in the area such as the North Texas Food Bank.
