= Hindu Temple of Toledo =

Hindu temple in Toledo, Ohio Metropolitan Area US

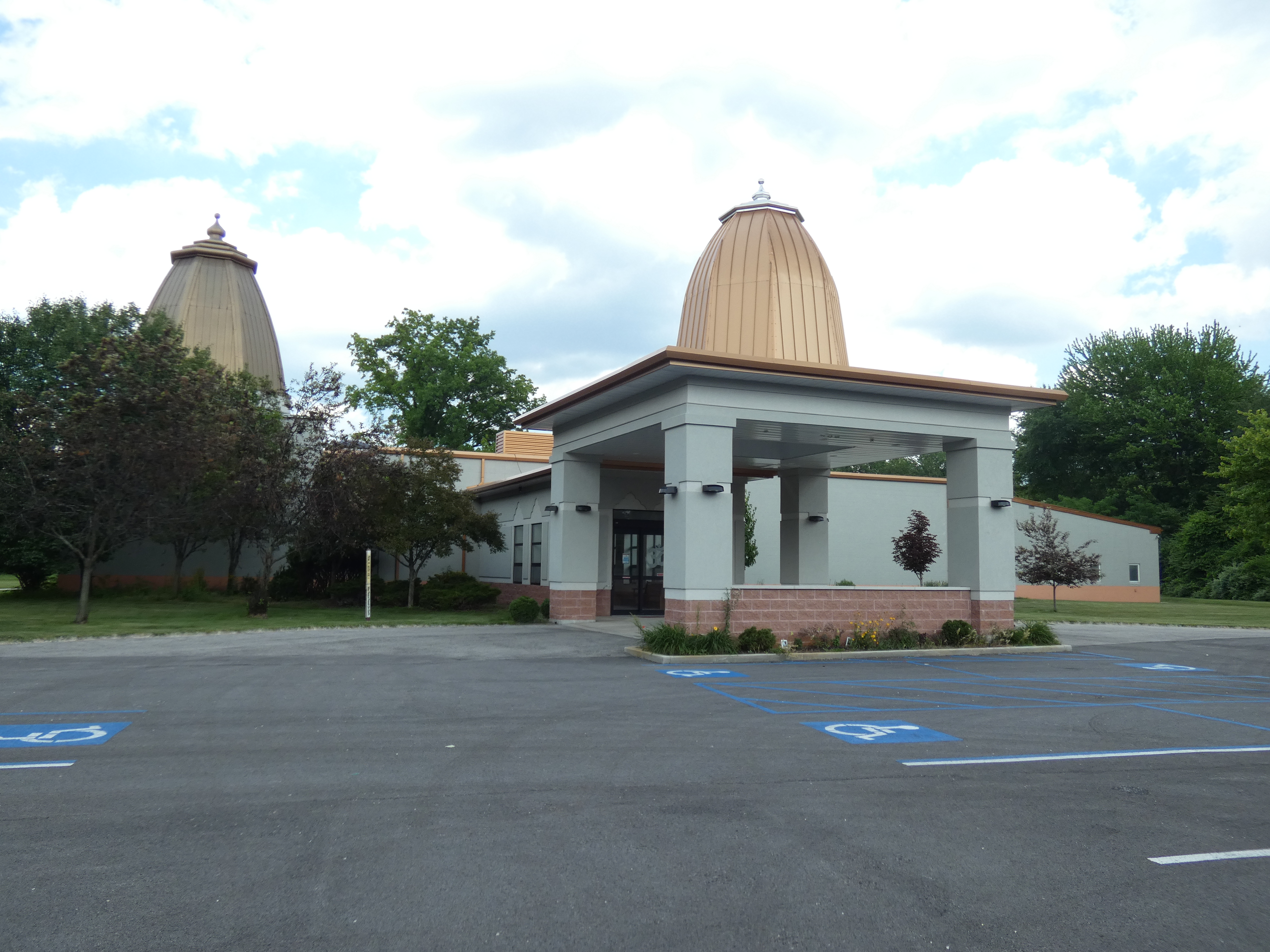

- Location in Ohio

Religion
- Affiliation: Hinduism

Location
- Location: Sylvania
- State: Ohio
- Country: United States
- Coordinates: 41.693509°N 83.721705°W

Architecture
- Completed: August 15, 1989

Website
- www.lakshmiganeshtemple.org

Hindu Temple of Toledo is a Mandir located in Sylvania, Ohio and serves the Hindu population of Northwest Ohio.

== History ==
In 1964, The India Association of Toledo was founded to serve the needs of the growing Indian American community. In 1982, the Hindu Temple of Toledo organization was formed and in 1989, the first permanent building for the Hindu Temple was built. The temple serves over 400 Hindu families in the Toledo Metropolitan Area along with 300 Indian students at University of Toledo and Bowling Green State University. Since 2003, HTT has been a member of the local multifaith council of Toledo, dedicated to spreading knowledge of Hinduism and having a dialogue with other religious bodies. The 30th Anniversary of the Hindu Temple of Toledo occurred in 2019, and was celebrated with a pooja for Lakshmi. On October 27, 2019, The temple celebrated its 30th Diwali with an estimated 500 families attending the celebrations.
