= Hindu Temple of Dayton =

Hindu temple located in Beavercreek, Ohio, United States

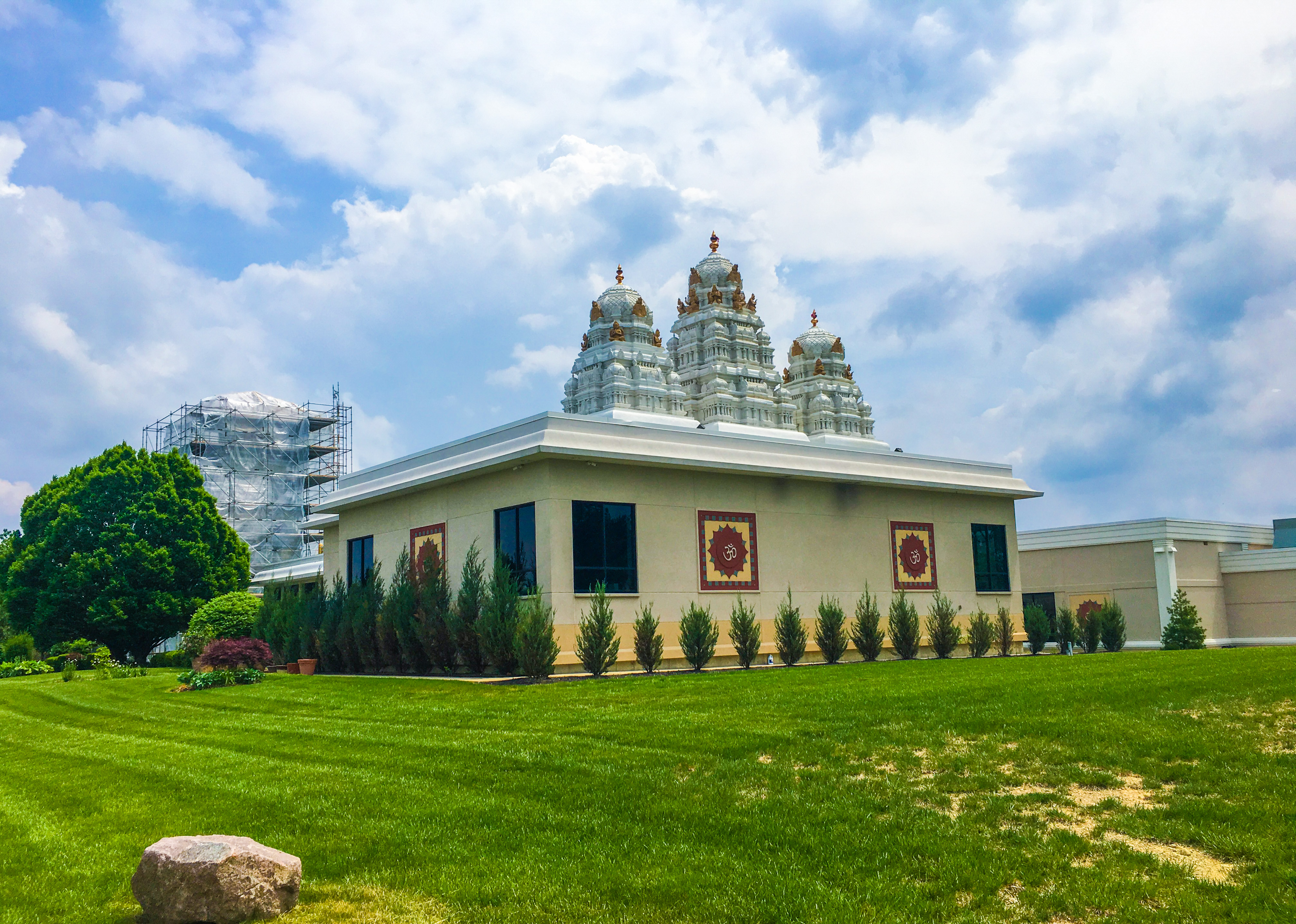
- The temple in 2018

- Location in Ohio

Religion
- Affiliation: Hinduism
- Deity: Venkateshwara

Location
- Location: Beavercreek
- State: Ohio
- Country: United States
- Interactive map of Hindu Temple of Dayton
- Coordinates: 39.765587°N 84.047518°W

Architecture
- Completed: 1985
- Elevation: 260 m (853 ft)

Website
- daytontemple.com

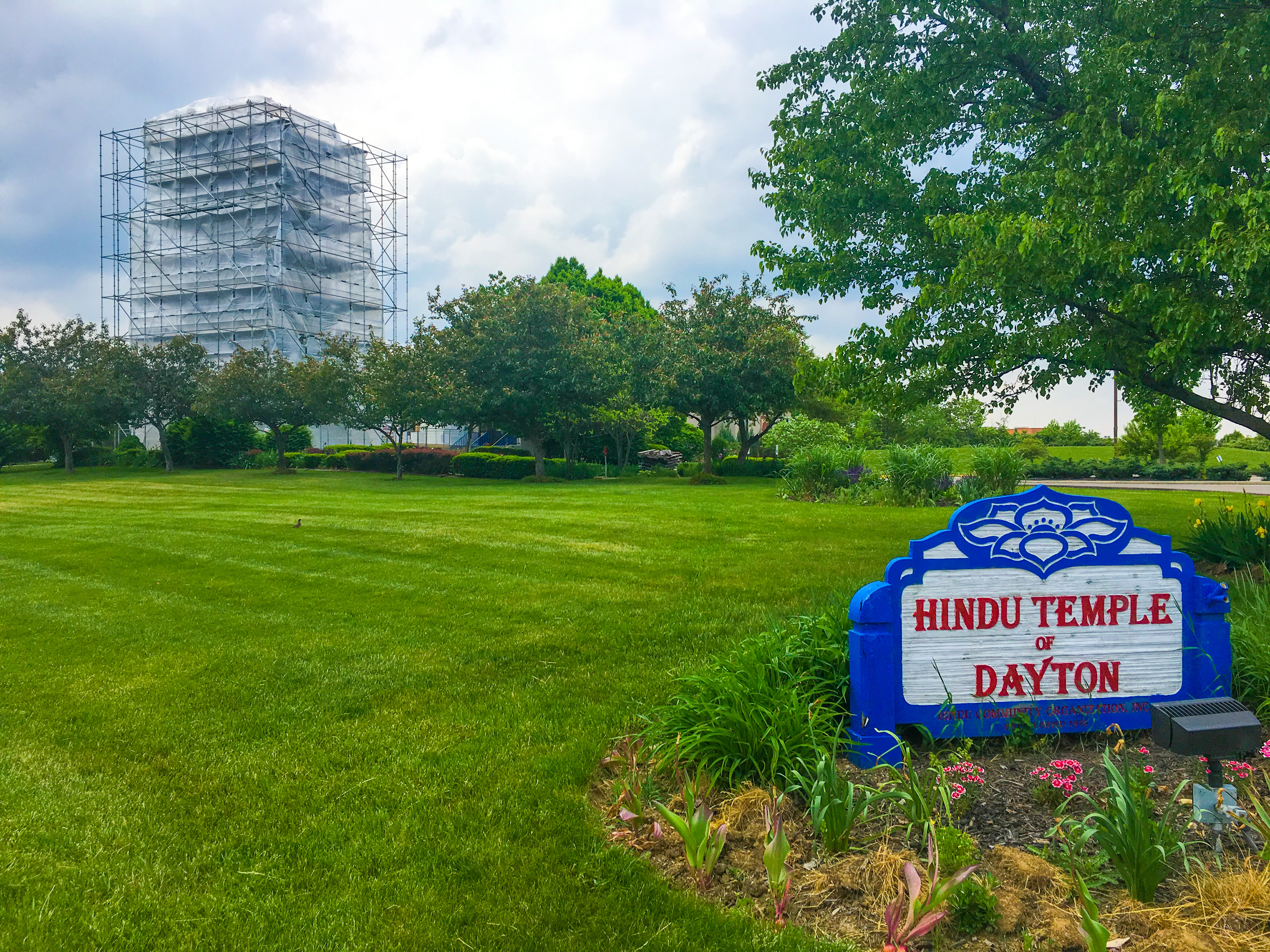
Hindu Temple of Dayton undergoing a Rajagopuram restoration, May 2018

The Hindu Temple of Dayton is a Hindu temple in Beavercreek, Ohio. It opened in 1984, making it the oldest Hindu temple in the Dayton metropolitan area. It has shrines for the deities Venkateshwara, Rama and Sita, Lakshmana and Hanuman, Ganesha, and Radha Krishna.

== History ==
The Hindu Community Organization of Dayton began the effort to build the temple in 1977. Dr. Soma Avva led a group of local Hindu doctors to purchase land in suburban Beavercreek and donated it to the organization. Avva raised funds from the Hindu community to finance the construction of the temple, its gopurams (towers), and the installation of its deities.

The construction was opposed by some area residents. After the organization took Beavercreek city officials to court, the city issued zoning and building permits for the temple. After a year of construction at a cost of $500,000, the temple opened to the public in 1984. During its first year, it was visited by approximately 2,000 Hindu families from surrounding areas. The temple was completed and consecrated in August 1985.

In 1993, the temple renovated its shrines and reconsecrated the deities and domes to celebrate its eighth anniversary.

In 2009, construction was initiated to expand for a puja hall next to the temple. The hall serves as a multipurpose area for celebrations, classes, and cultural activities. Starting in 2011, the temple underwent two years of major renovations. During these renovations, shrines of Bhagawan Chandramauli, Tripura Sundari, Bhudevi, Lakshmi and Navagraha were added. In May 2013, the renovation was completed, and a six-day festival was organized to inaugurate the expansion.

== Deities ==
The temple's main deity is Venkateshwara, a form of Vishnu, the god of preservation, reality, kāla (time), karma, restoration, and moksha (liberation). The statue was carved by Indian artisans out of black granite from the Himalayas. Other deities include Krishna and Rama, also forms of Vishnu. The statues are housed in marble-lined alcoves.

== Administration ==
The temple is administered by the non-profit Hindu Community Organization, Inc. It has an executive committee, board of directors, and board of trustees. It publishes the bi-monthly newsletter Mandir Vani, which discusses the organization, services, news, and religious information. The temple raises money through donations, fundraisers, and services. After serving four years on the board, Dr. Sunita Agarwal was elected president of the temple in 2023.

== Services and community ==
Several hundred people visit the temple on a weekly basis. Two priests perform services based on Hindu principles. As with most Hindu temples, fees can be charged for special prayers and services. There are also scheduled events and services held throughout the week. Every Sunday, the god Venkateshwara is given a sacred bath, while Shiva is bathed on Mondays.

In addition, the Dayton Hindu Temple serves as a community center. There is a weekly table tennis game, anniversary celebrations, summer camps for children, lectures, and yoga classes.

== Festivals ==
The Hindu Temple of Dayton celebrates several annual festivals. Navaratri is observed in September or October with daily pujas. Diwali, the festival of lights, is marked with prayers and community gatherings. Holi, the festival of colors, is celebrated with events at the temple. In May 2013, a six-day festival marked the completion of major renovations and the addition of new shrines. The temple celebrated its 40th anniversary and a Maha Kumbhabhishekam (consecration ceremony) in 2025. Special pujas are held monthly for Purnima (full moon) on other significant days.
