= Hindu Temple and Cultural Center of Kansas City =

- Location in Kansas Hindu Temple and Cultural Center of Kansas City (the United States)

Religion
- Affiliation: Hinduism

Location
- Location: Shawnee
- State: Kansas
- Country: United States
- Coordinates: 39.013117°N 94.762028°W

Website
- www.htccofkc.org

Hindu Temple and Cultural Center of Kansas City or HTCC Kansas City, is located on 6330 Lackman Road, Shawnee, KS, 66217 and serves the Hindu and Jain population of the Kansas City Metropolitan Area.

== History ==
In 1982, the need for a Hindu temple was discussed among the local Hindu and Jain population and plans were started to build a Hindu temple in Johnson County. 4 Families sent requests for establishing an organization to create the Hindu temple and asked for donations to purchase the lot that the HTCC would be built on. In May 1983, was recognized by the IRS as a religious organization and given tax exempt status. HTCC bought 5 acres of Land in an undeveloped part of Shawnee, Kansas, relatively close to where the majority of Hindus in the Kansas City Area lived. On October 27, 1985, the groundbreaking ceremony began and on May 22, 1988, the Hindu Temple was opened and held an opening ceremony with thousands in attendance. Many murtis, idols of gods, were imported from India and the temple was designed with sculptures of various Hindu & Jain gods and goddesses on the inside and outside. In April 1991, the Temple was complete in its design. Today, HTCCKC receives over 600 visitors a week with certain Hindu festivals such as Diwali drawing crowds over 1,000 people.

== Design ==
The facility is a square building. The entrance has an area to remove shoes before entering the temple. The rest of the facility is a carpeted area dedicated for worship with a middle aisle to bow down to all deities in the temple. The temple has services in 16 languages and has Hindu rituals performed outside the temple for a fee.

== Awards ==
The temple's youth group does several charity events and fund raising for victims of natural disasters around the world. The Youth Group raised over $6,000 for victims of the 2010 Haiti Earthquake.

== See also ==
- St. Louis Jain temple
