= Hindu Temple of Bloomington-Normal =

- Location in Illinois

Religion
- Affiliation: Hinduism

Location
- Location: Bloomington
- State: Illinois
- Country: United States
- Interactive map of Hindu Temple of Bloomington-Normal
- Coordinates: 40.454998°N 88.915458°W

Architecture
- Completed: 2014; 12 years ago

Website
- www.ourhindutemple.org

Hindu Temple of Bloomington-Normal is a Hindu Temple located in Bloomington, Illinois and serves the Hindu population of the Bloomington-Normal Metropolitan Area. It is located at 1815 Tullamore Ave, in Bloomington, Illinois.

== History ==
Since 1978, the Hindu population of Bloomington-Normal had planned to build a permanent Hindu temple for the Bloomington-Normal area. In 2006, an organization for the Hindu Temple of Bloomington-Normal was created to facilitate the creation of the Hindu Temple and fundraising. In 2007, a website was created for the Hindu Temple. In 2009, the temple acquired 2.75 acres and began the process of purification of the land. The temple was given a building permit for $700,000 in June 2013. In April 2014, the Hindu Temple was finally built and opening ceremonies were held.

== Design ==
The Hindu Temple was designed to be non-sectarian and multi-use. The Hindu Temple has a conference room, kitchen, dining area, stage, library and several rooms dedicated to teach Sunday School, Yoga and Indian cultural classes. Since the temple is non-sectarian, it houses several Hindu deities from various sects and regions of India. There is also a space dedicated for Jains to worship at.
