= Yajamana =

Patron of a sacrificial ritual in Hinduism

A yajamana (Sanskrit: यजमान, romanized: Yajamāna) is the ritual patron, on whose behalf a religious ritual or a yajna is performed by a Hindu priest, generally a Brahmin.
