= Mount Soma =

- Mount Soma
- Location in the United States
- Coordinates: 35°39′25.8″N 82°51′56.0″W
- Country: United States

Language
  - Official: English

Mount Soma is a 435-acre Vedic Vastu community in the Blue Ridge Mountains of North Carolina established in 2011.

== Description ==
The Mount Soma center includes a visitor center, a meditation hall and the Vedic Sri Somesvara Temple. The temple was built using 46 tons of hand-carved Indian granite and Vastu architecture. The temple grounds include hand-carved black granite Navagrahas (nine planets) and a 20-foot statue of Lord Hanuman.
