= Hindu Temple of Atlanta =

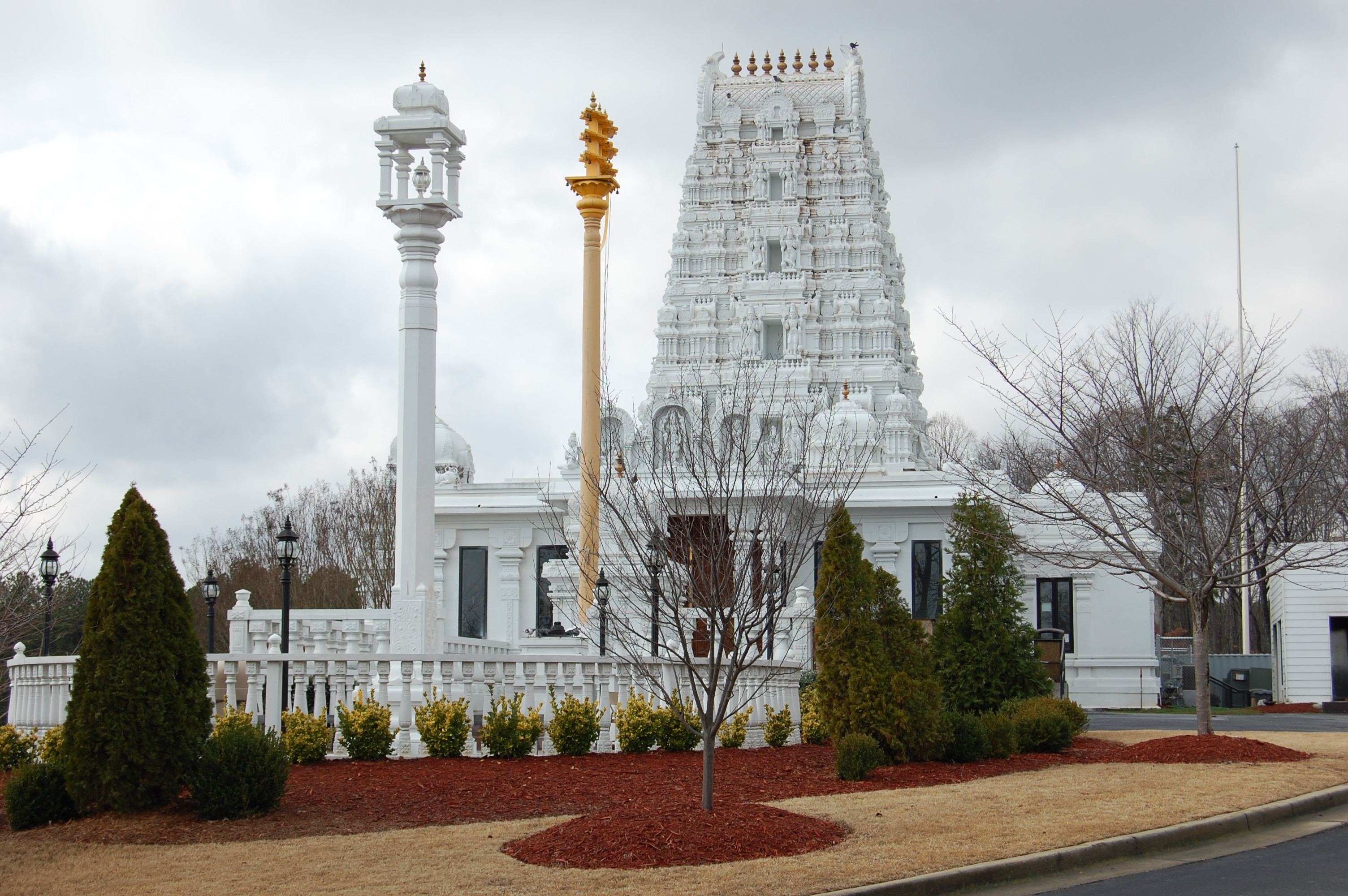

- Location in Georgia

Religion
- Affiliation: Hinduism
- Deity: Lord Vishnu and Lord Shiva

Location
- Location: Riverdale
- State: Georgia
- Country: United States
- Coordinates: 33.5954°N 84.4087°W

Architecture
- Completed: 1990

Website
- www.hindutempleofatlanta.org

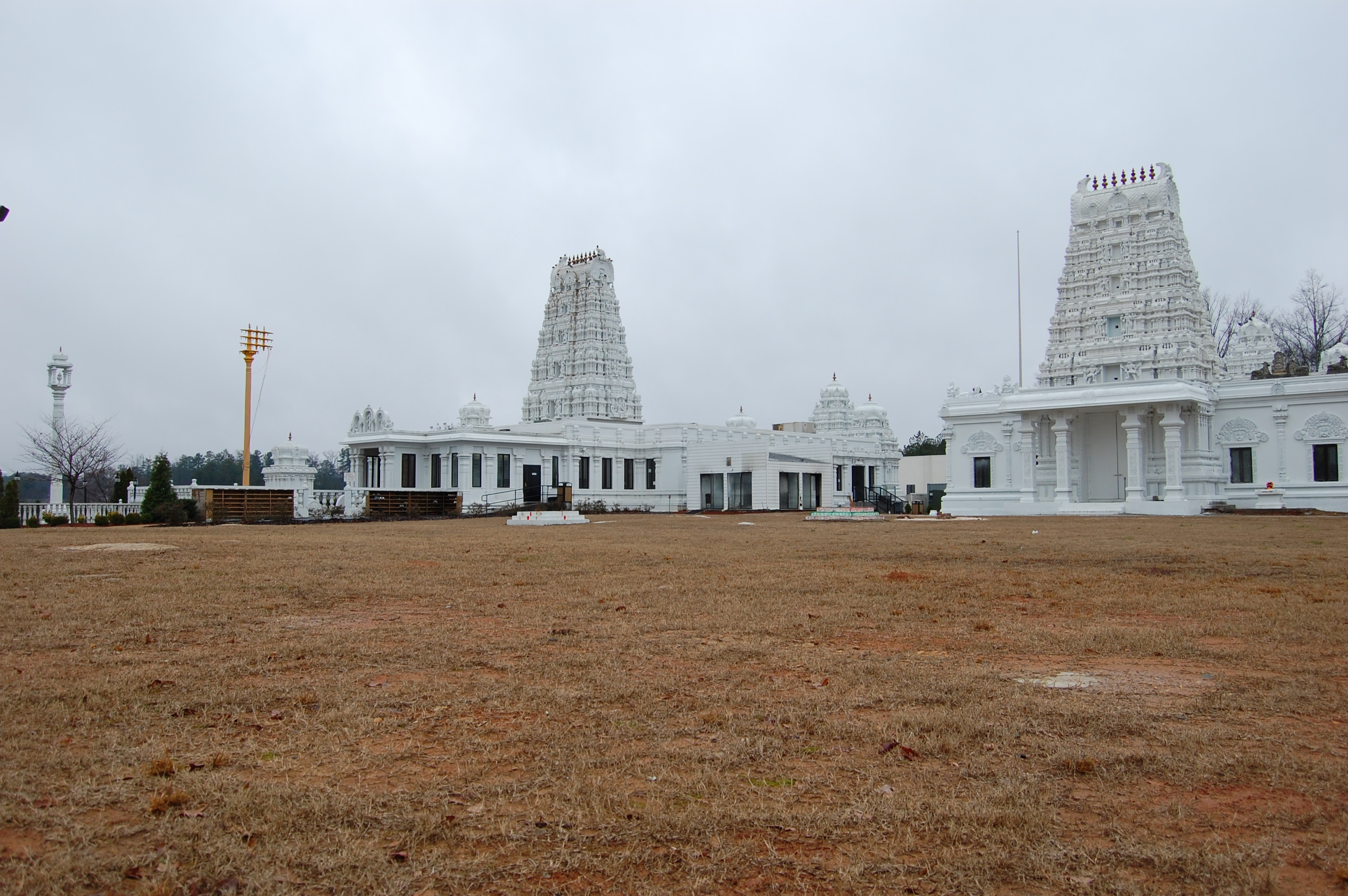
The two complexes at the temple, Lord Shiva's temple is to the right

The Hindu Temple of Atlanta is located in Riverdale, Georgia, and serves the Metro Atlanta Hindu population. But, because of its proximity to the I-75, and its popularity, nearly 5-10% of the devotees are from the eastern seaboard, southern, and midwestern states. The temple is 9-miles away from the Hartsfield-Jackson International Airport terminal. It has been rated as one of the top 10 Hindu temples in the US.

== History ==
The temple was established on 19 October 1984 and closely conforms to temple architecture from the Pandya Empire.

== Design ==
The Hindu temple has two complexes – the older and larger shrine for Lord Venkateswara as the presiding deity, and the newer one consecrated in 2007 with Lord Shiva as the presiding deity. Because the Shiva temple here is adjunct to the Venkateshwara temple, Lord Shiva is known as Ramalingeshwara. In addition to the presiding deity, both complexes have shrines for other deities such as Padmavathi, Hanuman, Ganesha, Kala Bhairava, Navagragha etc.
