= Hindu Temple of Greater Chicago =

Hindu temple complex in Lemont, Illinois, United States

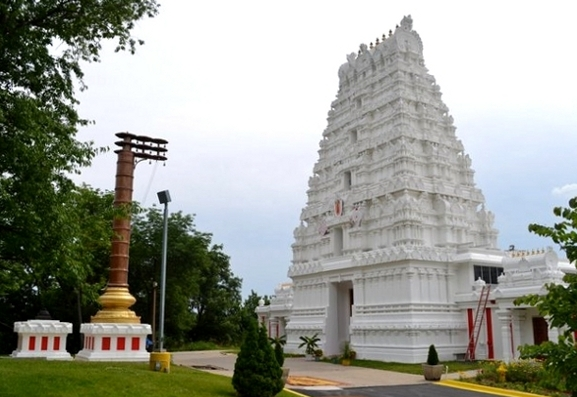
- Rama temple

Religion
- Affiliation: Hinduism

Location
- Location: Lemont
- State: Illinois
- Country: United States
- Interactive map of Hindu Temple of Greater Chicago
- Coordinates: 41.689068°N 88.004458°W

Architecture
- Completed: 1986, 1994

Specifications
- Temple: 2
- Monument: 1

Website
- http://www.htgc.org/

The Hindu Temple of Greater Chicago (HTGC) is a Hindu temple complex in Lemont, Illinois. It was inaugurated and opened to the public on July 4, 1986. The complex includes a Rama temple and a temple for Ganesha, Shiva, and Durga.

== History ==
In 1977, a group of South Indian community leaders formed the Hindu Temple of Greater Chicago organization. They chose Rama as the main deity of the future temple due to his wide appeal among Hindu immigrants in the United States. After considering around thirty sites in the Chicago metropolitan area, the organization bought eighteen acres of undeveloped bluff land near Lemont, a southwestern suburb. Accessibility, seclusion, and cost were the deciding factors.

To finance the temple's construction, the organization conducted fundraising activities and secured loans. In 1982–83, it started holding its rituals and gatherings in a home and in rented halls in southwest suburban Downers Grove and Romeoville on a temporary basis.

In 1983–84, frustrated by slow progress toward temple construction, a group of Telugu professionals left the organization to build their own Venkateswara temple in west suburban Aurora. Commenting on the split, scholar Padma Rangaswamy wrote, "The history of temple building in Chicago is also the story of bitter infighting among rival groups." Author Raymond Williams remarked, "The difficulties encountered in developing the plans and in raising the funds for the temple indicate how hard it is to unite people from the various regions and sects in support of one project."

After the split, the organization continued with its plans. The foundation stone of the Rama temple was laid in June 1984. After two years of construction, the temple was inaugurated with a kumbhabhishekham on July 4, 1986.

In 1994, the original building on the site was converted to a temple dedicated to Ganesha, Shiva, and Durga. A kumbhabhishekham was performed for the temple in the summer of 1994.

== Temple complex ==
Ganesha-Shiva-Durga temple

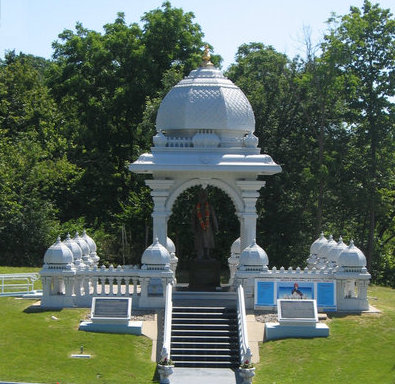
Vivekananda statue

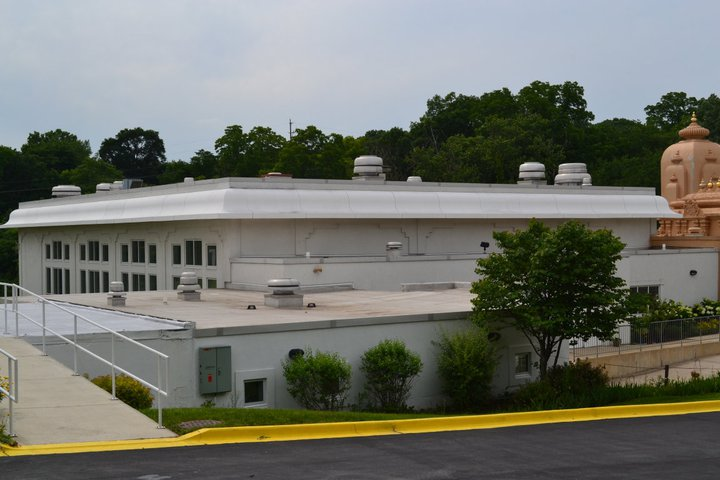
Community center

The temple complex consists of four buildings: the Rama temple, the Ganesha-Shiva-Durga temple, a community center connecting the two temples, and the Swami Vivekananda Spiritual Center. The Rama temple has images of Rama, Sita, Lakshmana, Ganesha, Hanuman, Venkateshwara (Balaji), Mahalakshmi, Krishna, and Radha. The Ganesha-Shiva-Durga temple includes images of Shiva, Ganesha, Durga Devi, Subrahmanya, Parvathi, Nataraja, Ayappasamy, and Navagraha.

The Swami Vivekananda Spiritual Center holds activities such as yoga, meditation, and spiritual lectures. Next to the center is a 10-foot bronze statue of Swami Vivekananda. Its design was inspired by a photograph of Swami Vivekananda in Chicago taken after the World's Parliament of Religions in 1893.
