= Prana pratishtha =

Hindu religious ceremony

Prana pratishtha (IAST: prāṇa pratiṣṭhā) is the rite or ceremony by which a murti (devotional image of a deity) is consecrated in a Hindu temple or Jain temples. The Sanskrit terms prana means "life" and pratishtha means "to be established." Following detailed steps outlined in the Vedic scriptures, verses (mantras) are recited to invite the deity to reside in the murti (idol). Typically, consecration is a ritual only performed during consecration or renovation of a temple or shrine.

== Etymology ==
Prāṇa pratiṣṭhā is a compound of prāna and pratiṣṭhā. The noun prāna is derived from the Sanskrit verbal root "an," meaning "to breathe" or "to live", with the added prefix "pra-" which implies a "forward activity". Prāna can be located in the heart. Therefore, in Sanskrit literature, prāna denotes breath or vital breath and, in broader contexts, the vital principle or life force.

Pratiṣṭhā, derived from the root verb "stha", which means "to be established", and the prefix "prati", which means "toward". In general usage, pratiṣṭhā refers to the act of consecrating, installation, or establishing in a permanent position. The term pratiṣṭhā, or sthāpanā, refer to the rites through which a material representation of the deity is transformed into the deity itself; the terms can also describe the physical positioning of an image within a temple.

In the Atharvaveda, pratiṣṭhā refers to a capacity of the feet, whereas the Aitareya Āranyaka uses the term to describe the grip or hold one has on the ground beneath one's feet. The Śatapatha Brāhmana uses the related verb pratiṣṭhati for standing firmly on one's feet, along with the causative pratiṣṭhāpayati for placing or installing an object.

Accordingly, prāṇa pratiṣṭhā can be understood as the establishment or infusion of life. In the context of murti consecration, the term refers to the ritual process through which prāṇa is established in the murti, thereby transforming the image into a sacred embodiment of the deity.

== In Hinduism ==
=== Philosophical significance ===
The origins of prāna pratishthā are rooted in ancient Vedic traditions, where rituals were performed to invoke the divine into objects. The understanding is that God can be both intrinsic and transcendent and accessible through physical symbols (murtis). Through prāna pratishthā, devotees can interact with the divine in a personal manner. These practices were meticulously documented in the scriptures such as the Agamas and Tantras with guidelines on how to perform such rituals.

This ritual is most common with temple installations, though household deities are also consecrated for worship. For temple murtis, prana pratishtha is usually performed once, establishing a lasting consecration.

=== Ritual procedure ===
The prāna pratishthā ceremony involves several steps from purification rites to the invocation of the deity through the steps outlines in the scriptures.

1. Purification (Shuddhi) - the murti is cleansed and purified to remove impurities.
2. Invocation (Avahana) - the deity is invoked into the murti through specific mantras and rituals prescribed in the scriptures.
3. Infusion of life (Prāna pratishthā) - this is the core of the ritual where prāna is put into the murti through various mantras. The performer of the ritual places their right hand on the heart of murti and recites the mantras for infusing life breath (prāna) into the murti.
4. Offerings (Upachara) - they deity is offered items such as flowers, fruits, and incense, symbolizing sustenance for the divine in the murti.
5. Opening of the eyes (nētra pratishthā, or netraunmīlana): this stage of the ritual ceremony involves glossing the murti's eyes with a golden implement, and this particular act marks the moment in which the murti comes to life.

== In Jainism ==
=== Concept ===
In Jainism, performing prana pratishtha in Jain temples is symbolic of the ideal qualities of the Tirthankaras rather than a divine presence. Prana refers to the vital energy in all living beings emphasizing the principle of non-violence (ahimsa) towards all life forms. Thus, the focus of prana pratishtha is invoking a spiritual presence to inspire devotees.

=== Philosophical significance ===
The philosophical foundation of prana pratishtha in Jainism is rooted in anekantavada. Depending on the observer's spiritual views, the physical image can represent multiple meanings.

The focus of the ritual is solely on mental and physical purity derived from the non-violence principle.

=== Ritual process ===
The ritual begins where the image is bathed, purified, and adorned with sacred items. Following this, verses are recited and other ritual invocations occur. The ritual of consecrating an image to bring "life to temple" is attested in medieval Jain documents.

== See also ==
- Mîs-pî - ancient Mesopotamian ritual for the induction of a newly manufactured divine idol
