= List of music artists and bands from England =

This is a list of notable bands/musicians from England, UK.

== By cities in alphabetical order ==
- Abingdon
  - Radiohead
- Accrington
  - Diana Vickers
- Andover
  - The Troggs
- Anstey
  - Molly Smitten-Downes
- Ashby-de-la-Zouch
  - The Young Knives
- Ashford
  - Bossk (band)
- Aylesbury
  - Marillion
- Bamber Bridge
  - Kevin Brown (blues musician)
- Banbury
  - Gary Glitter
- Barnsley
  - The Danse Society
  - Saxon
  - The Ward Brothers
- Basildon
  - The Assembly
  - Depeche Mode
  - Kunt and the Gang
  - Yazoo
- Basingstoke
  - Canterbury
  - Kingsland Road
- Bath
  - Goldfrapp
  - The Korgis
  - Propellerheads
  - Tears for Fears
- Batley
  - Robert Palmer
- Battle
  - Keane
- Beccles
  - Fearless Vampire Killers
- Bedford
  - Briganté
  - Don Broco
- Bedworth
  - Pete Doherty
- Belgravia
  - Christopher Lee
- Berwick-Upon-Tweed
  - Won Mississippi
- Bewdley
  - Becky Hill
- Bexhill on Sea
  - Mumm-Ra
- Bexleyheath
  - Kate Bush
- Billericay
  - Alison Moyet
  - Lauren Platt
- Bingley
  - Marmozets
- Birkenhead
  - Elvis Costello
  - Half Man Half Biscuit
  - Miles Kane
- Birmingham
  - Anaal Nathrakh
  - Apache Indian
  - Au Pairs
  - Band of Joy
  - The Beat
  - Benediction
  - Black Sabbath
  - Blakfish
  - Polly Brown
  - Byron Hare
  - Charged GBH
  - Deluka
  - The Destroyers
  - Dexys Midnight Runners
  - Duran Duran
  - Editors
  - Godflesh
  - Electric Light Orchestra
  - The English Beat
  - Fashion
  - The Fortunes
  - Fine Young Cannibals
  - Jahméne
  - Judas Priest
  - Johnny Foreigner
  - Laura Mvula
  - Magnetophone
  - The Moody Blues
  - The Move
  - Musical Youth
  - Napalm Death
  - Oceans Ate Alaska
  - Ocean Colour Scene
  - Silent Jack
  - The Spencer Davis Group
  - Spunge
  - Steel Pulse
  - The Streets
  - Swim Deep
  - Toyah
  - Traffic
  - The Twang
  - UB40
  - Wizzard
- Bishop's Stortford
  - SuRie
- Blackburn
  - Grace Davies
- Blackpool
  - Boston Manor
  - Jethro Tull
- Bolton
  - Badly Drawn Boy
  - Buzzcocks
  - Cherry Ghost
  - Kinesis
- Bolton-upon-Dearne
  - The Sherlocks
- Bournemouth
  - Air Traffic
  - Electric Wizard
  - Heart In Hand
- Bradford
  - 1919
  - Tasmin Archer
  - Blue Roses
  - The Cult
  - Kiki Dee
  - Susan Fassbender
  - Gareth Gates
  - Zayn Malik
  - My Dying Bride
  - New Model Army
  - Random Hand
  - Smokie
  - Terrorvision
  - Ti Amo
  - Kimberley Walsh
  - White Light Parade
- Braintree
  - Next of Kin
  - The Prodigy
  - Missing Andy
  - Jellicoe
- Brentwood
  - InMe
- Brighouse
  - Embrace
- Brighton
  - Architects
  - As It Is
  - Beats International
  - Black Peaks
  - Blood Red Shoes
  - Brakes
  - British Sea Power
  - Clearlake
  - Conor Maynard
  - Dead Swans
  - Eighties Matchbox B-Line Disaster
  - Electrelane
  - Frankie Cocozza
  - Freemasons
  - Gnarwolves
  - High Tyde
  - Huggy Bear
  - James Marriott
  - Johnny Truant
  - Lambrini Girls
  - Lovejoy
  - Moulettes
  - Passenger
  - Peggy Sue
  - Rex the Dog
  - Rizzle Kicks
  - Royal Blood
  - Samantha Womack
  - Squid
  - Tall Ships
  - TOY
  - The Electric Soft Parade
  - The Ghost of a Thousand
  - The Go! Team
  - The Kooks
  - The Lambrettas
  - The Levellers
  - The Pipettes
  - The Qemists
- Bristol
  - Blue Aeroplanes
  - Claytown Troupe
  - Disorder
  - Fuck Buttons
  - Idles
  - Massive Attack
  - New Rhodes
  - Nik Kershaw
  - Pinch
  - Portishead
  - Tricky
  - Turbowolf
- Bromsgrove
  - Michael Ball
- Burnley
  - Chumbawamba
- Burton-upon-Trent
  - Joe Jackson
- Bushey
  - Simon Le Bon
  - Wham!
- Buxton
  - Lucy Spraggan
- Camberley
  - Reuben
- Cambridge
  - Black Country, New Road
  - The Broken Family Band
  - Cavetown
  - Clean Bandit
  - Isaac's Aircraft
  - Katrina and the Waves
  - Mallory Knox
  - Olivia Newton-John
  - Pink Floyd
- Camden
  - N-dubz
- Canterbury
  - Bodyrockers
  - Caravan
  - Lucy Spraggan
  - Moose Blood
  - PinkPantheress
  - Soft Machine
  - The Wilde Flowers
  - Yndi halda
- Carlisle
  - Art
  - Nicki French
  - Spooky Tooth
  - The V.I.P.'s
- Chelmsford
  - Felix
  - Jonas Blue
  - Rat Boy
- Cheltenham
  - Jim Lockey & The Solemn Sun
  - Kitty Brucknell
- Cheshire
  - Johnny and the Semitones
  - Viola Beach
  - David Gray
- Chester
  - Mansun
  - The Reads
- Chichester
  - Tom Odell
- Chinnor
  - Adam Clayton
- Chorley
  - John Foxx
- Clacton-on-Sea
  - Paul Banks
  - Sade
- Colchester
  - Graham Coxon
  - Modern English
  - Special Duties
  - Stevi Ritchie
- Corby
  - Raging Speedhorn
  - Viking Skull
- Cornwall
  - Thirteen Senses
  - Haven
  - Al Hodge
  - Aphex Twin
- Coventry
  - All About Eve
  - Bolt Thrower
  - Cathedral
  - Clint Mansell
  - Delia Derbyshire
  - Doc Scott
  - The Enemy
  - Fun Boy 3
  - Lisa Lashes
  - Melissa Graham
  - Hazel O'Connor
  - Jigsaw
  - Lieutenant Pigeon
  - Panjabi MC
  - The Primitives
  - The Ripps
  - The Selecter
  - The Sorrows
  - The Specials
  - Vince Hill
- Crawley
  - The Cure
- Crosby
  - Marcus Collins
- Croydon
  - Ben Haenow
  - Feng
  - Rough Copy
- Dagenham
  - Sandie Shaw
- Derbyshire
  - Anti Pasti
  - Lightyear
  - LostAlone
  - The Newcranes
  - The Struts
- Doncaster
  - Louis Tomlinson
  - Yungblud
- Douglas, Isle of Man
  - Bee Gees
- Earlestown
  - The K's
- Eastbourne
  - Toploader
- East London
  - 5 After Midnight
- East Tilbury
  - Anne-Marie
- Egremont
  - It Bites
- Essex
  - Shadows Chasing Ghosts
  - We Are the Ocean
- Exeter
  - Muncie Girls
- Folkestone
  - Fast Food Rockers
- Frodsham
  - Gary Barlow
- Glastonbury
  - Reef
- Gloucestershire
  - EMF
  - Milk Teeth
- Godalming
  - Genesis
- Grantham
  - Look Mum No Computer
- Great Yarmouth
  - Catherine Wheel
  - Myleene Class
  - Ruth Vincent
- Greenford
  - The Magic Numbers
- Guildford
  - Fastlane
  - Shadowkeep
  - The Stranglers
  - The Vapors
- Hackney
  - dressmaker
  - Idris Elba
- Halifax
  - Ed Sheeran
  - Paradise Lost
- Hampshire
  - Canterbury
  - Frank Turner
  - Laura Marling
  - Rex Orange County
- Harrogate
  - Acid Reign
  - Blood Youth
  - The Harrogate Band
  - Little Angels
  - Olly Alexander
  - Stuart Colman
  - Sulk
  - Utah Saints
  - Wally
- Harrow
  - Honey G
  - Ian Dury
  - New Device
- Hartlepool
  - Michael Rice
  - Sneaker Pimps
- Havering
  - Imogen Heap
- Helmsley
  - One Night Only
- Hemel Hempstead
  - Porcupine Tree
- Herefordshire
  - Ellie Goulding
  - Mott the Hoople
- Hertfordshire
  - Victoria Beckham
  - Deep Purple
  - Frank Carter & The Rattlesnakes
  - Heights
  - Lower Than Atlantis
  - The Shadows
  - The Subways
  - The Zombies
- Hertford
  - George Ezra
- High Wycombe
  - Howard Jones
  - Jack Garratt
  - Thee Hypnotics
  - Young Guns
- Hitchin
  - James Bay
- Holmes Chapel
  - Harry Styles
- Hoylake
  - The Rascals
- Huddersfield
  - Evile
- Hull
  - Patricia Bredin
  - The Spiders From Mars
  - Everything But The Girl
  - The Housemartins
  - Kingmaker
  - The Beautiful South
  - Fila Brazillia
  - The Paddingtons
  - Red Guitars
  - Scarlet
  - Throbbing Gristle
- Hyde
  - I Am Kloot
- Ilford
  - Kathy Kirby
- Ipswich
  - Basement
  - Rosalita
  - Cradle of Filth
  - Extreme Noise Terror
- Isle of Wight
  - Level 42
  - Grade 2
  - Sarah Close
  - Wet Leg
  - Coach Party
- Islington
  - Helena Bonham Carter
- Kendal
  - Wild Beasts
- Kensington
  - Javine Hylton
  - Paul Hardcastle
- Kent
  - HRVY
  - Kate Bush
  - Matt Terry
  - Mimi Webb
  - Orbital
  - Nick Heyward
  - Sub Focus
- King's Lynn
  - Deaf Havana
- Kirkby
  - China Crisis
- Laindon
  - Josh James
- Lancashire
  - Joni Fuller
- Lancaster
  - Bondax
  - How's My Pop
  - The Lovely Eggs
- Leamington Spa
  - Nizlopi
  - The Shapes
  - Sharks
- Leeds
  - Alt-J
  - Bonobo
  - Boyracer
  - Carolynne Poole
  - The Chevin
  - Chumbawamba
  - Classically Handsome Brutes
  - Club Smith
  - Delta 5
  - Dinosaur Pile-Up
  - The Dunwells
  - Ellen and the Escapades
  - ¡Forward, Russia!
  - Gang of Four
  - Grammatics
  - Hadouken!
  - Hawk Eyes
  - The Hollow Men
  - Hood
  - I Like Trains
  - Jellyfish Kiss
  - Kaiser Chiefs
  - To Kill a King
  - Luke Friend
  - Mekons
  - Mel B
  - The Mission
  - The Music
  - Pale Saints
  - The Parachute Men
  - The Pigeon Detectives
  - Pulled Apart By Horses
  - Red Lorry Yellow Lorry
  - The Rose of Avalanche
  - Scritti Politti
  - Sigma
  - The Sisters of Mercy
  - Soft Cell
  - Steve Phillips
  - The Sunshine Underground
  - The Wedding Present
  - Utah Saints
  - Various Cruelties
  - Vessels
- Leicester
  - Blab Happy
  - The Bomb Party
  - Chrome Molly
  - Codex Leicester (band)
  - Cornershop
  - Crazyhead
  - The Deep Freeze Mice
  - Delicatessen
  - Diesel Park West
  - Easy Life
  - Engelbert Humperdinck
  - Family
  - Gaye Bykers on Acid
  - Her Name is Calla
  - The Hunters Club
  - Kasabian
  - Kyte
  - Maybeshewill
  - Misterlee
  - Pacific Ocean Fire
  - Perfume
  - Po!
  - Public Relations Exercise
  - Prolapse
  - Ruth's Refrigerator
  - Sam Bailey
  - Showaddywaddy
  - Volcano The Bear
  - Yeah Yeah Noh
- Leighton Buzzard
  - Kajagoogoo
  - The Barron Knights
- Lewisham
  - D-Block Europe
- Littlehampton
  - Delirious?
- Lincoln
  - The Casuals
  - Climates
- Lincolnshire
  - Bram Tchaikovsky
  - I Was A Cub Scout
- Liss
  - Aeone
- Liverpool
  - Anathema
  - Atomic Kitten
  - The Bandits
  - BBMak
  - The Beatles
  - The Boo Radleys
  - Carcass
  - Cast
  - Crucial Three
  - The Crescent
  - The Christians
  - Christopher Maloney
  - Cilla Black
  - Circa Waves
  - Dead or Alive
  - Echo and the Bunnymen
  - EsDeeKid
  - The Farm
  - Gerry and the Pacemakers
  - Hot Club De Paris
  - The Icicle Works
  - A Flock of Seagulls
  - Frankie Goes to Hollywood
  - Jemini
  - The La's
  - Ladytron
  - Lawson
  - The Lightning Seeds
  - The Merseybeats
  - The Mighty Wah!
  - The Real Thing
  - Rebecca Ferguson
  - The Searchers
  - Sizer Barker
  - Sonia
  - Space
  - The Stairs
  - The Stands
  - The Teardrop Explodes
  - The Zutons
  - Wave Machines
  - The Wombats
  - WSTR
- London
  - Above & Beyond
  - Adam and the Ants
  - Add N to (X)
  - Adele
  - The Adverts
  - AJ Tracey
  - Akercocke
  - Alabama 3
  - The Alan Parsons Project
  - Alexandra Burke
  - Alien Sex Fiend
  - All Saints
  - AlunaGeorge
  - America
  - Amy Winehouse
  - Angel Witch
  - The Apostles
  - Archive
  - Athlete
  - Baby D
  - The Babys
  - Babyshambles
  - Bad Company
  - Bad Manners
  - Bananarama
  - Barbarossa
  - Bark Psychosis
  - Basement Jaxx
  - Bastille
  - Bat For Lashes
  - Banco de Gaia
  - Beabadoobee
  - Beady Eye
  - Bedrock
  - The Beloved
  - Benga
  - Ben Howard
  - Big Bang
  - Big Narstie
  - The Big Pink
  - Big Zuu
  - Billy Idol
  - Black Midi
  - Blancmange
  - Bleech
  - Bloc Party
  - Blonde Electra
  - Blue
  - Blue Pearl
  - Blues Incorporated
  - The Bluetones
  - Blur
  - Bôa
  - The Bolshoi
  - Bomb the Bass
  - Bombay Bicycle Club
  - Bonzo Dog Doo-Dah Band
  - Bow Wow Wow
  - Breton
  - Bronski Beat
  - Bryan Johnson
  - Emma Bunton
  - Bush
  - Callender's Cableworks Band
  - Carter The Unstoppable Sex Machine
  - Central Cee
  - Chad & Jeremy
  - Chase & Status
  - Chris Farlowe and the Thunderbirds
  - The Chords
  - The Clash
  - Classix Nouveaux
  - Clement Marfo & The Frontline
  - Client
  - Cliff Richard
  - The Clique
  - Cockney Rejects
  - Coldplay
  - Dave
  - Elvis Costello
  - Cream
  - The Creatures
  - Crystal Fighters
  - Culture Club
  - Daisy Chainsaw
  - Damage
  - The Damned
  - Daniel Radcliffe
  - Darkstar
  - Daughter
  - David Bowie
  - The Dave Clark Five
  - Days in December
  - D-Block Europe
  - Death in Vegas
  - Declan McKenna
  - Deep Purple
  - The Defiled
  - Delilah
  - Delta Heavy
  - Devil Sold His Soul
  - Digga D
  - Dire Straits
  - Dirty Pretty Things
  - Dizzee Rascal
  - Django Django
  - DragonForce
  - The Dream Academy
  - Dry the River
  - Dot Rotten
  - Dumpy's Rusty Nuts
  - Dusty Springfield
  - Dua Lipa
  - Ebony Bones
  - Eclection
  - The Edge
  - Edison Lighthouse
  - The Ethical Debating Society
  - The Echoes
  - Elastica
  - Eliza Doolittle
  - Ella Mai
  - Engineers
  - Erasure
  - Estelle
  - East 17
  - Eddy Grant
  - Eurythmics
  - Example
  - The Faces
  - The Fades
  - Faithless
  - The Feeling
  - Fightstar
  - Five
  - The Fixx
  - Fleetwood Mac
  - Flo
  - Florence + the Machine
  - The Flying Pickets
  - Foghat
  - Four of Diamonds
  - Fredo
  - Freeez
  - Furniture
  - Gary Numan
  - Gay Dad
  - George Michael
  - Ghostpoet
  - Girls Aloud
  - Goldfrapp
  - Goldheart Assembly
  - Gold Panda
  - Gorgon City
  - Gorillaz
  - Go West
  - Groove Armada
  - Hadouken!
  - Haken
  - Hawkwind
  - Headie One
  - Hear'Say
  - The Herbaliser
  - Heaven's Basement
  - Hell Is for Heroes
  - The Hoosiers
  - Hot Chip
  - Hot Chocolate
  - The House of Love
  - The Hurt Process
  - Ikara Colt
  - Infadels
  - Iron Maiden
  - James Blake
  - James Blunt
  - Jamie T
  - Jamiroquai
  - Japan
  - Jazz Jamaica
  - Jess Glynne
  - Jessie J
  - Jessie Ware
  - J Hus
  - The Jim Jones Revue
  - The Jimi Hendrix Experience
  - Jme
  - Johnny Panic
  - The Joker & The Thief
  - Jungle
  - Kano
  - Kate Nash
  - Katie Melua
  - Katy B
  - Ken Colyer
  - Killing Joke
  - Kim Wilde
  - The King Blues
  - King Charles
  - The King Blues
  - King Crimson
  - King Krule
  - The Kinks
  - Kissing the Pink
  - Klaxons
  - KSI
  - La Roux
  - Labrinth
  - Lady Sovereign
  - The Last Dinner Party
  - Led Zeppelin
  - Leona Lewis
  - Lianne La Havas
  - The Libertines
  - Lily Allen
  - Little Mix
  - Lo Fidelity Allstars
  - Lola Young
  - Loveable Rogues
  - Love Affair
  - Lush
  - Lydian Collective
  - Lynsey de Paul
  - Mabel
  - The Maccabees
  - Madness
  - The Magic Numbers
  - Manfred Mann
  - Mark Ronson
  - McFly
  - Meat Beat Manifesto
  - The Members
  - The Merton Parkas
  - M.I.A.
  - Michael Kiwanuka
  - Mika
  - Million Dead
  - Modestep
  - The Molotovs
  - Morcheeba
  - The Motors
  - Motörhead
  - Mount Kimbie
  - Mud
  - Mumford and Sons
  - Mystery Jets
  - My Vitriol
  - Nero
  - The New Seekers
  - The Nice
  - Noah and the Whale
  - Noisettes
  - Nurse with Wound
  - Oh Wonder
  - Olivia Dean
  - One Direction
  - The One Hundred
  - Only the Young
  - The Only Ones
  - The Others
  - The Outfield
  - P.C.T
  - Palma Violets
  - The Passions
  - Petrol Girls
  - Pet Shop Boys
  - Phil Collins
  - Phixx
  - Pink Floyd
  - Placebo
  - Plan B
  - The Pogues
  - The Police
  - The Pretenders
  - Procol Harum
  - Psapp
  - The Psychedelic Furs
  - Public Image Ltd.
  - Public Service Broadcasting
  - Pure Love
  - Pure Reason Revolution
  - PVT
  - Queen
  - The Raincoats
  - The Rakes
  - Raye
  - Razorlight
  - Regular Fries
  - Rialto
  - The Rifles
  - Robin Scott
  - Rod Stewart
  - The Rolling Stones
  - Roxy Music
  - Rudimental
  - The Ruts
  - Sade
  - Saint Etienne
  - Sam Smith
  - Samantha Fox
  - The Saturdays
  - Savages
  - S Club 7
  - S Club 8
  - Scouting For Girls
  - Seal
  - Secret Affair
  - Seefeel
  - Senser
  - Sex Pistols
  - The Shadows
  - Sham 69
  - Shola Ama
  - Siouxsie and the Banshees
  - Sisteray
  - Skepta
  - Skinny Girl Diet
  - Skinny Lister
  - The Skints
  - Skunk Anansie
  - Slash
  - Sleep Token
  - Small Faces
  - Spandau Ballet
  - Spector
  - Spice Girls
  - Splashh
  - Squeeze
  - Status Quo
  - Stereolab
  - Stereo Kicks
  - Stereo MC's
  - Skream
  - Stooshe
  - Stormzy
  - Strawbs
  - Suede
  - Sugababes
  - Supertramp
  - Sweet Dreams (1970s band)
  - Sweet Dreams (1980s band)
  - Sweet
  - T. Rex
  - Taio Cruz
  - Talk Talk
  - The Tears
  - Tempa T
  - Ten Benson
  - The Temperance Movement
  - Test Icicles
  - Theatre of Hate
  - The The
  - Thompson Twins
  - Tinie Tempah
  - Tion Wayne
  - Tomorrow
  - Tom Vek
  - Transvision Vamp
  - Tribes
  - Tubeway Army
  - The Tuts
  - U.K. Subs
  - UFO
  - Ultravox
  - Underworld
  - Union J
  - UNKLE
  - Uriah Heep
  - The Vaccines
  - The Vamps
  - Veronica Falls
  - Visage
  - Voice of the Beehive
  - Vondelpark
  - Wargasm
  - White Lies
  - Whitesnake
  - The Wanted
  - The Waterboys
  - The Who
  - Wiley
  - Wilkinson
  - Wire
  - The Wiseguys
  - Wolf Alice
  - Wretch 32
  - The xx
  - The Yardbirds
  - Years & Years
  - Yes
  - Young Guns
  - Zero 7
  - 21 Savage
- Lowestoft
  - A
  - Lil' Chris
  - The Darkness
  - Hot Leg
- Luton
  - Jethro Tull
  - Paul Young
- Lymington
  - Adamski
  - Birdy
- Macclesfield
  - Ian Curtis
  - John Mayall
  - The Virginmarys
- Malvern
  - Cher Lloyd
- Manchester
  - 10cc
  - The 1975
  - 52nd Street
  - 808 State
  - A Certain Ratio
  - A Guy Called Gerald
  - A II Z
  - Aitch
  - Amplifier
  - Audioweb
  - Autechre
  - Ed Banger and The Nosebleeds
  - Barclay James Harvest
  - Beecher
  - Bee Gees
  - Big Flame
  - Billy Ruffian
  - Black Grape
  - Blak Twang
  - Blue Orchids
  - Bugzy Malone
  - Brassy
  - Buzzcocks
  - Blossoms
  - The Chameleons
  - The Chemical Brothers
  - Cleopatra
  - The Clint Boon Experience
  - Courteeners
  - Crispy Ambulance
  - Daley
  - Delphic
  - Doves
  - Dutch Uncles
  - The Durutti Column
  - Easterhouse
  - Elbow
  - Electronic
  - Everything Everything
  - The Fall
  - Fingathing
  - Flip & Fill
  - Freddie and the Dreamers
  - Freeloaders
  - Future Sound of London
  - Godley & Creme
  - Happy Mondays
  - Haven
  - Herman's Hermits
  - Tom Hingley and the Lovers
  - The Hollies
  - Hot Milk
  - Hurts
  - I Am Kloot
  - Inspiral Carpets
  - James
  - Joy Division
  - Kinesis
  - King of the Slums
  - Lamb
  - The Longcut
  - Liam Gallagher
  - Longview
  - Love City Groove
  - Ludus
  - Luxuria
  - M People
  - Magazine
  - Man From Delmonte
  - Marconi Union
  - John Mayall & the Bluesbreakers
  - Mazes
  - The Mindbenders
  - Mint Royale
  - Misha B
  - Molly Half Head
  - Monaco
  - Morrissey
  - The Mothmen
  - N-Trance
  - Nemzzz
  - New Hope Club
  - New Order
  - Nine Black Alps
  - Noel Gallagher's High Flying Birds
  - Northside
  - Oasis
  - Oceansize
  - Omerta
  - The Other Two
  - Pale Waves
  - Paris Angels
  - The Passage
  - Puressence
  - pyncher
  - Quando Quango
  - Rae & Christian
  - The Railway Children
  - Ruthless Rap Assassins
  - Sad Café
  - The Seahorses
  - Simply Red
  - Slaughter & The Dogs
  - The Slow Show
  - The Smirks
  - The Smiths
  - Sonic Boom Six
  - Space Monkeys
  - Spookey
  - Starsailor
  - Sub Sub
  - The Stone Roses
  - Sweet Sensation
  - Swing Out Sister
  - Take That
  - Theatre of Hate
  - The Ting Tings
  - Van der Graaf Generator
  - The Verve
  - The Waltones
  - The Whip
  - World of Twist
- Matlock
  - Karma Kid
  - Rhythm Plate
  - Diagrams
  - The Accidental
  - Ben Ottewell
- Middlesbrough
  - Chris Rea
  - Dartz!
  - Paul Rodgers
  - Micky Moody
  - The Axis of Perdition
  - James Arthur
  - Space Raiders
- Milton Keynes
  - Fellsilent
  - Hacktivist
  - TesseracT
- Moreton
  - Humble Pie
- Nantwich
  - Blitz Kids
- Newcastle upon Tyne
  - The Animals
  - Brian Johnson
  - Cheryl Cole
  - Dubstar
  - Forgodsake
  - Eric Burdon
  - Lighthouse Family
  - Maxïmo Park
  - Mark Knopfler
  - Jimmy Nail
  - Neil Tennant
  - Raven
  - Sakima
  - Sam Fender
  - Sting
  - Venom
  - The Wildhearts
  - YFriday
  - yourcodenameis:milo
  - Zoviet France
- Newcastle-Under-Lyme
  - Dan Croll
- Newton-le-Willows
  - Rick Astley
- North London
  - Andy Abraham
  - Headie One
  - Jme
  - The Kinks
  - Skepta
- North Shields
  - Sam Fender
- Norwich
  - Cathy Dennis
  - Let's Eat Grandma
  - Sigala
- Northampton
  - Alan Walker
  - Bauhaus
  - The Departure
  - Maps
  - The Jazz Butcher
  - Jealous
  - Slowthai
- Northwich
  - The Charlatans
- Nottingham
  - Area 11
  - Church of the Cosmic Skull
  - Consumed
  - Earthtone9
  - Fudge Tunnel
  - Heck
  - Holly Humberstone
  - Ice MC
  - Imaani
  - Iron Monkey
  - Jake Bugg
  - London Grammar
  - Paper Lace
  - Pitchshifter
  - Sabbat
  - Skyclad
  - Sleaford Mods
  - Stereo MC's
  - Ten Years After
  - Tindersticks
  - Curtis Whitefinger
- Notting Hill
  - Mabel
- Nuneaton
  - Fresh Maggots
- Nunthorpe
  - Amelia Lily
- Oulton Broad
  - Leanne Mitchell
- Oxford
  - Bellowhead
  - Foals
  - Glass Animals
  - Hugh Laurie
  - Ride
  - Seabuckthorn
  - Stornoway
  - Supergrass
  - Swervedriver
  - Talulah Gosh
  - Totally Enormous Extinct Dinosaurs
  - Winnebago Deal
  - Youthmovie Soundtrack Strategies
- Pakefield
  - Rob Houchen
- Peterborough
  - Aston Merrygold
  - The Wytches
- Pinner
  - Elton John
- Plaistow
  - Jade Ewen
- Poringland
  - Ronan Parke
- Portsmouth
  - The Cranes
  - Simon Dupree & The Big Sound
  - Gentle Giant
- Poulton-le-Fylde
  - Skrewdriver
- Preston
  - Carolyn Watkinson
  - Dream Frequency
  - Edwina Hayes
  - Heather Baron-Gracie
  - Helen Lemmens-Sherrington
  - Ken Nicol
  - Maimuna Memon
  - Sophie McDonnell
  - Team Waterpolo
  - The KBC
- Reading
  - The Amazons
  - The Arusha Accord
  - Chapterhouse
  - The Cooper Temple Clause
  - Does It Offend You, Yeah?
  - Exit Ten
  - A Genuine Freakshow
  - Lost Velvet
  - Only The Poets
  - Slowdive
  - Sylosis
- Redbridge
  - Frances Ruffelle
- Redditch
  - The Cravats
  - The Very Things
  - John Bonham
- Romford
  - Billy Ocean
  - Purple Hearts
- Rugby
  - James Morrison
  - Lavondyss
  - Spacemen 3
  - Spiritualized
- Salford
  - The Cold One Hundred
- Salisbury
  - Dave Dee, Dozy, Beaky, Mick & Tich
- Scunthorpe
  - Jake Quickenden
- Sheffield
  - 65daysofstatic
  - ABC
  - A.C. Temple
  - All Seeing I
  - Arctic Monkeys
  - Artery
  - Babybird
  - Bal-Sagoth
  - Black Spiders
  - Blameless
  - Bring Me the Horizon
  - Bromheads Jacket
  - Cabaret Voltaire
  - The Comsat Angels
  - The Crookes
  - Def Leppard
  - Derek Bailey
  - Drenge
  - Fat Truckers
  - Graham Fellows
  - Heaven 17
  - Hiem
  - Hoggboy
  - The Human League
  - I Monster
  - In the Nursery
  - Joe Cocker
  - Kings Have Long Arms
  - The Last Shadow Puppets
  - LFO
  - Lindsay Dracass
  - Little Man Tate
  - Living in a Box
  - The Long Blondes
  - Longpigs
  - The Lovers
  - Milburn
  - Moloko
  - Monkey Swallows the Universe
  - Pink Grease
  - Pulp
  - Reverend and The Makers
  - Richard Hawley
  - Rolo Tomassi
  - Slow Club
  - Smokers Die Younger
  - While She Sleeps
- Shepherd's Bush
  - Central Cee
- Shoreditch
  - Matt Monro
- Somerset
  - Ozric Tentacles
  - The Wurzels
- Southampton
  - Band of Skulls
  - Benny Hill
  - Bury Tomorrow
  - Craig David
  - Creeper
  - Delays
  - Foxes
  - Jona Lewie
  - Moss
- Southend
  - Busted
  - The Hamsters
  - The Horrors
  - Get Cape. Wear Cape. Fly
  - Nothing But Thieves
- Southport
  - Gomez
- South Shields
  - Angelic Upstarts
  - Jade Thirlwall
- Stafford
  - Bizarre Inc
  - Climax Blues Band
- Staines
  - HARD-FI
- St Albans
  - Dark Stares
  - Enter Shikari
  - Friendly Fires
  - Trash Boat
  - Your Demise
- Stanford-le-Hope
  - Dan Le Sac Vs Scroobius Pip
- Start Hill
  - Charli XCX
- Stevenage
  - Fields of the Nephilim
- St Helens
  - The Lancashire Hotpots
- Stockport
  - Blossoms
  - Daz Sampson
- Stoke-on-Trent
  - D Mob
  - Discharge
  - Joe and Jake
  - Motörhead
  - Robbie Williams
  - Slash
- Stourbridge
  - Diamond Head
  - Ned's Atomic Dustbin
  - Pop Will Eat Itself
  - Witchfinder General
  - The Wonder Stuff
- Streatham
  - Dave
- Streetly
  - Connie Talbot
- Sunderland
  - Frankie & The Heartstrings
  - The Futureheads
  - Field Music
  - Kenickie
  - Leatherface
- Surrey
  - Blind Faith
  - Canterbury
  - Disclosure
  - Eric Clapton
  - Fatboy Slim
  - François Dolmetsch
  - Hundred Reasons
  - Los
  - Lucy Rose
  - Newton Faulkner
  - Scarlett Lee
  - The Stranglers
  - You Me at Six
- Sussex
  - Chloe Jasmine
  - The Feeling
- Swindon
  - The Dead Lay Waiting
  - XTC
- Tavistock
  - The Rumblestrips
- Teddington
  - Keira Knightley
- Teignmouth
  - Muse
- Telford
  - The Sunshine Underground
- Tetney
  - Ella Henderson
- Tewkesbury
  - FKA Twigs
  - Spunge
- Thurrock
  - Louisa Johnson
- Tooting
  - Raye
- Torquay
  - Wishbone Ash
- Uxbridge
  - Colour Me Wednesday
- Wallsend
  - Sting (musician)
- Walthamstow
  - Fleur East
- Wakefield
  - Be Bop Deluxe
  - The Cribs
  - The Research
  - Skint & Demoralised
- Walsall
  - Jorja Smith
- Watford
  - Gallows
  - Geri Halliwell
  - Naughty Boy
  - Rak-Su
  - Sikth
- Wednesbury
  - Joanne Shaw Taylor
- Wellington (Salop)
  - T'Pau
- West Bromwich
  - Band of Joy
  - Robert Plant
- Weybridge
  - Nashville Teens
  - You Me At Six
- Weymouth
- Whitley Bay
  - Tygers of Pan Tang
- Whittingham
  - Robert Coyne
- Widnes
  - Melanie C
- Wigan
  - The Lathums
  - Richard Ashcroft
  - The Verve
- Wirral
  - Elvis Costello
  - Orchestral Manoeuvres in the Dark
- Witham
  - Olly Murs
- Woking
  - Jentina
  - The Jam
- Wolverhampton
  - Babylon Zoo
  - Slade
  - Liam Payne
  - S-X
- Worcester
  - Peace
- Worthing
  - The Ordinary Boys
- York
  - Asking Alexandria
  - John Barry
  - Chris Helme
  - The Batfish Boys
  - The Redskins
  - Shed Seven
  - The Seahorses
  - The Smoke
  - Glamour of the Kill
  - Elliot Minor
  - RSJ
  - Mostly Autumn
