= PCT =

PCT, P.C.T. or pct may refer to:

== Math, science and technology ==
- pct, an abbreviation for "%" (percentage)
- PCT theorem, on parity, charge and time inversions
- Pentachlorotoluene, an aromatic chemical compound
- Perceptual control theory, a model of behavior
- Personal Communication Telephone, a mobile telephone service
- Polychlorinated terphenyl, an industrial chemical
- Polycyclohexylenedimethylene terephthalate, a thermoplastic polyester
- Private Communications Technology, an obsolete Internet security protocol
- Programmable communicating thermostat, California, US term
- Projected capacitive touchscreen, a type of touchscreen technology

== Medicine ==
- Patient care technician
- Person-centered therapy
- Porphyria cutanea tarda, the most common subtype of porphyria
- Postcoital test, for infertility
- Post-coital tristesse
- Pragmatic clinical trial
- Primary care trusts, UK NHS bodies 2001–2013
- Procalcitonin, a precursor of the hormone calcitonin
- Progestogen challenge test
- Proximal convoluted tubule, in the kidney
- Proton computed tomography (pCT), or proton CT

== Places ==
- Pacific Crest Trail, US hiking trail from Mexico–US to Canada–US border
- Potomac Consolidated TRACON, FAA facility designation
- Princeton Airport (New Jersey), Montgomery Township, New Jersey, US, IATA code

== Politics ==
- Communist Party of Togo (Parti Communiste du Togo)
- Congolese Party of Labour (Parti Congolais du Travail)
- Tunisian Communist Party (Parti Communiste Tunisien)

== Other ==
- Pacific Time (PCT), year-round time zone for the Canadian province of British Columbia following discontinuation PST & PDT = permanent PDT = UTC−07:00 time zone
- P.C.T, hip-hop musicians
- Paleolithic continuity theory, suggesting the Proto-Indo-European language comes from the Upper Paleolithic
- Patent Cooperation Treaty, an international patent treaty
- Pennsylvania College of Technology
- Phi Chi Theta, fraternity
- Presbyterian Church in Taiwan
- Presbyterian Church of Tasmania
- Production car trial, a type of classic trial or off-road motor car rally
- Territorial Control Plan (Plan Control Territorial), Salvadoran anti-gang security policy
