= Leigh Harrison =

Leigh Harrison may refer to:

- Leigh Harrison, musician in Kids Love Lies
- Leigh Harrison, character in Mr. Monk and the Airplane

== See also ==
- Lee Harrison (disambiguation)
