= The Janitors =

English alternative rock/noise rock band

- Tim Stirland, Craig Hope, Andrew Denton, Pete Crowe - Leicester '85

Background information
- Origin: Leicester/Sunderland/Newcastle, England
- Genres: Noise rock, alternative rock
- Years active: 1984–1989
- Labels: In-Tape, Abstract
- Past members: Andrew Denton; Craig Hope; Simon Warnes; Tim Stirland; Pete Crowe; Jeff Murray; Phil Storey; Bobo Nando (Paul Touche)

The Janitors were an alternative rock/noise rock band from Sunderland & Newcastle, formed in 1984.

== History ==
The Janitors were Andrew Denton (vocals), Craig Hope (lead guitarist, keyboards), Pete Crowe (bass guitar), and Tim Stirland (drums). Denton, Hope and friend Phil Storey recorded demos in Leicester's Highfields which Yeah Yeah Noh's John Grayland brought to the attention of some indie labels. Described as "a mixture of Membranes meeting Captain Beefheart", they signed to Marc Riley's In-Tape label, releasing their debut single, "Chicken Stew" in July 1985 (on which Hope played all of the instruments). It went on to reach the top 10 of the UK Independent Chart. In anticipation of the single's release, Denton and Hope moved to Newcastle to recruit bassist Simon Warnes, however Crowe took his place bringing along fellow art student Tim Stirland as drummer (replacing the drum machine of the first single).

Second single "Good to be King" was also an indie hit, reaching number 14, and debut album Thunderhead, produced by Jon Langford of The Mekons, peaked at number 6 on the indie albums chart. The band recorded three sessions for John Peel's BBC Radio 1 show, one each year between 1985 and 1987. Pete Crowe was ejected over a dispute with Denton and replaced by Jeff Murray. The band then moved to the Abstract label. In 1988 Phil Storey joined on rhythm guitar. After two further singles, their second album, Deafhead, was released in June 1988. The band released one more single and in late 1988, Dentover left the band. American Bobo Nando picked up the mike, contributing to one new song "Billy Psycho". The band dissolved in August 1989.

Stirland went on to perform with My Bloody Valentine and The Mekons. Hope (Hoppy) is currently guitar technician for Chris Martin of Coldplay. Denton is now an history teacher. Jeff Murray formed G.R.O.W.T.H. with Kev of Gaye Bykers on Acid and Tommo of The Bomb Party, but they split after one album. Crowe moved to New Zealand. Nando (Paul Touche) sang briefly with Birthmark. Phil Storey died in July 2014.

== Discography ==
=== Albums ===
- Thunderhead mini-LP (1986), In-Tape – UK Indie No. 6
- Deafhead (1988), Abstract

=== Singles, EPs ===
- "Chicken Stew" (1985), In-Tape – UK Indie No. 9
- "Good to be King" (1986), In-Tape – UK Indie No. 14
- "Family Fantastic" (1987), Abstract
- "Moonshine" (1988), Abstract
- "Halfway to Happening" (1988), Abstract

=== Compilation appearances ===
- Imminent 4 (1986), Food: "Really Shrinking"
- Six Disques Bleu (1987), Abstract: "No Where"
- British Airwaves (1988), JCI: "Going To Be"
- Good Morning Mister Presley (198?), Grunt Grunt A Go Go: "The Devil Goes To Whitley Bay"
