= Sizer =

Sizer may refer to:

== People ==
- Josephine E. Sizer (1862-1937), American temperance reformer
- Stephen Sizer (born 1953), English author on Judeo-Christian topics
- Ted Sizer (1932–2009), founder of the Essential school movement
- Theodore Sizer (art historian) (1892–1967), American art historian, author

== Places ==
- Mount Sizer, prominent peak located on Blue Ridge in Henry W. Coe State Park in California

== Other ==
- Sizer Barker, indie band from Liverpool, England
