= Dressmaker (disambiguation) =

A dressmaker is a person who makes custom clothing for a person.

Dressmaker may refer to:

- dressmaker (band), a London-based post punk band
- Dressmaker (video game), a 2026 video game
- The Dressmaker (Bainbridge novel), a 1973 gothic psychological novel written by Beryl Bainbridge
- The Dressmaker (Ham novel), a 2000 gothic novel written by the Australian author Rosalie Ham
- The Dressmaker (1988 film), a 1988 film based on Bainbridge's novel
- The Dressmaker (2015 film), a 2015 film based on Ham's novel
