= Codex Leicester (band) =

English band

Codex Leicester are a four piece band from Leicester (England). They comprise Dave Fellows (Guitar) Kris Tearse (Drums/Vocals) Tiernan Welch (Bass) and Scott West (Guitar/Vocals).

Conceived in 2010 by Scott West and Kris Tearse following the demise of post-grunge band Death of London, the song writing partnership grew quickly and productively. Dave Fellows, formerly of Pacific Ocean Fire and motion film soundtrack composing partner of Tearse joined shortly after before Tiernan Welch of defunct Public Relations Exercise joined later that year.

After a short period of gigging and 'viral propaghanda' created by design firm wetheconspirators the band quickly received praise and response from left-field specialist radio luminaries featuring on BBC Introducing as well as John Kennedy XFM, Adam Walton BBC Radio Wales and BBC Radio 1. A single Hey Hey Hot Legs was released through Big Scary Monsters records in 2011. In June 2012, Function Records, home of Maybeshewill amongst others released the band's debut EP entitled Mad Man's Lullaby which featured single Strong like Bull. The music video for the single was shot, edited and produced by 'wetheconspitators'. The EP was recorded and mixed by Dave Sanderson at 2Fly studios in Sheffield. The EP received mixed but generally positive praise.

The band have been featured on and supported by several important British publications such as Drowned in Sound, Artrocker, Classic Rock Magazine and The Fly.

== Discography ==
=== EPs ===
1. Mad Man's Lullaby (2012)

=== Singles and compilations ===
1. Strong Like Bull featured on Robot Needs Home 'exports#1' compilation (2011)
2. Hey hey Hot Legs featured on Big Scary Monsters '11 Collection (2011)
