= Maybeshewill =

English post-rock band

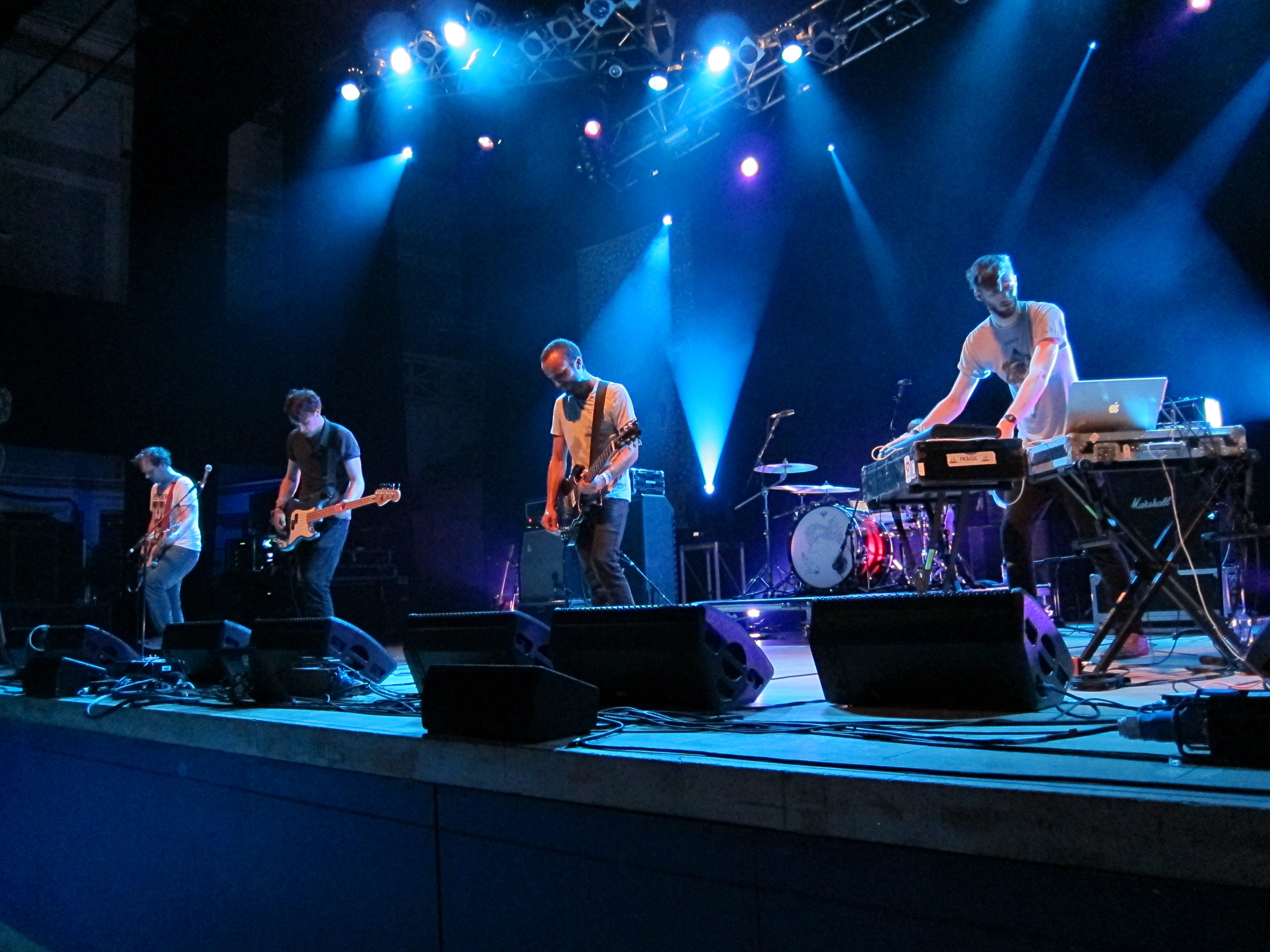
- On stage at the Summer Sundae festival, August 2012

Background information
- Origin: Leicester, England
- Genres: Post-rock; electronica; post-metal; math rock; instrumental
- Years active: 2005–2016; 2018; 2020–present
- Labels: Robot Needs Home; Field; XTAL; Superball
- Members: James Collins; John Helps; Robin Southby; Jamie Ward; Matthew Daly
- Website: maybeshewill.net

Maybeshewill are an English post-rock band from Leicester, England. Their music is characterised by the use of programmed and sampled electronic elements alongside guitars, bass, keyboards and drums.

== History ==
Maybeshewill were formed by guitarists Robin Southby and John Helps whilst the pair were studying music technology together at De Montfort University in 2005. They released their first record Japanese Spy Transcript on the band's own label, Robot Needs Home Records in 2006 with Tanya Byrne on bass guitar and Lawrie Malen on drums. The four-track EP was well received by the press and attracted the attention of Nottingham's Field Records (also home to Public Relations Exercise) who released "The Paris Hilton Sex Tape" (taken from the record) as part of a split 7-inch single with Ann Arbor later that year. In August 2006 a re-mastered version of Japanese Spy Transcript was released in Japan on the XTAL label (also home to Yndi halda and You Slut!) which was set up specifically for the release by The Media Factory Group. Shortly after this release the band dissolved temporarily.

In May 2007, Helps and Southby began working with drummer James Collins (formerly a member of Fight Fire With Water) and bassist Andrew Jackson, along with a number of guest vocalists and musicians on an album entitled Not for Want of Trying. The record was released on Monday 12 May 2008 through Field Records, and was chosen by BBC Radio 1 DJ Huw Stephens as his album of the week in its release week. "The Paris Hilton Sex Tape" also featured on the cover CD of June's edition of Rock Sound magazine.

Thirteen months later on 7 June 2009, the band released their second album Sing the Word Hope in Four-Part Harmony through Field Records, with Victoria Sztuka taking Andrew Jacksons place on bass guitar. This was a heavier record which saw them continue to try to break away from the post-rock tag with which they are often labelled. The record was received well by both press and fans alike, but did receive some criticism for failing to depart substantially enough from the band's established sound.

After the release of Sing The Word Hope, the band returned to the three-piece line-up of James Collins, John Helps and Robin Southby for a brief period before they were joined in 2009 by Jamie Ward, a former member of Kyte and Tired Irie who was to guide the recording session for their third album, as well as fill the vacant position of bassist. In 2011 the band became a five-piece with long-time collaborator Matthew Daly performing live keyboards.

In May 2011, the band released I Was Here for a Moment, Then I Was Gone, their third full-length record. According to press releases, the band approached the record as if it were their first album – ignoring any criticism of their previous work, be it positive or negative, and distancing themselves from any expectation of what they might produce. Produced by Jamie Ward the record was the first to be recorded in traditional studio spaces and consequently is more polished than any previous recordings. Live strings and brass were provided by members of Her Name Is Calla and Fight Fire With Water, adding more organic sounds to the bands electronic palette. The album received universally positive reviews from the music press, was played in its entirety twice on Kerrang Radio and gained Maybeshewill Rock Sound's 'Band of the Week' accolade two weeks running.

In March 2014, the band announced that they would release their fourth studio album through German based record label Superball Music. The album's title, Fair Youth, and release date, 25 August 2014, were announced in June 2014.

Maybeshewill toured very regularly across the UK, Europe and Asia. This has seen them pair up with And You Will Know Us by the Trail of Dead, Lite, Long Distance Calling, Earthtone9, &U&I, And So I Watch You From Afar and Cats & Cats & Cats (amongst others) on various excursions. They have also appeared at The Great Escape, Summer Sundae Weekender, Truck Festival, Brainwash Festival, 2000trees, Hockley Hustle, ArcTanGent and Dot To Dot Festivals.

In September 2015, the band announced that they would be disbanding after a brief final tour.

On 24 June 2018, the band played a special, one-off show in the Queen Elizabeth Hall at London's Southbank Centre as part of Robert Smith's Meltdown.

In January 2020, the band announced their reformation, as well as an appearance to ArcTanGent Festival. The festival was cancelled, however, they have started working on new material together. In November 2021 the band released their fifth studio album No Feeling Is Final.

On the 10th September 2025, the band announced on Instagram that they had requested for their music to be removed from Spotify citing that Spotify CEO Daniel Ek's continued investment in companies advancing military artificial intelligence and drone warfare was not compatible with who they were as a band.

== Robot Needs Home ==
Since their inception Maybeshewill have operated the 'business' elements of the band under the name Robot Needs Home. This 'label' set up by guitarist John Helps runs many of the band's affairs, but also works to support the wider music community which the band is part of. Continuing the band's own D.I.Y. ethos, the label works on the basis of 'promotion by association', collecting together artists who share a common ethic, and encouraging collaboration. As well as operating as a record label, Robot Needs Home provides booking and management services to other bands, and promotes shows in and around the city of Leicester, including the Maybeshewill curated White Noise Festival. The label has released most of Maybeshewill's smaller and digital releases, as well as their debut EP Japanese Spy Transcript.

== Musical style ==
The band have described their sound as "instrumental rock with electronics", while Drowned in Sound described them as sounding "like Mogwai would if the latter had ever found love in an arthouse cinema. And then were beaten around the head with a keyboard". Comparisons have also been made with Sigur Rós, and 65daysofstatic were often mentioned by reviewers as a likely influence on their earlier work. Their tracks often include samples of film or other dialogue; "Not for Want of Trying" contains a sample from Network, while Sing the Word Hope in Four Part Harmony includes samples of broadcaster Edward R. Murrow, and excerpts from Young Winston.

== Members ==
Current members

- James Collins (drums)
- Matthew Daly (keyboards)
- John Helps (guitar)
- Robin Southby (guitar)
- Jamie Ward (bass)

Former members

- Victoria Sztuka (bass)
- Andrew Jackson (bass)
- Lawrie Malen (drums)
- Tanya Byrne (bass)

== Discography ==
Albums

- Not for Want of Trying (2008)
- Sing the Word Hope in Four-Part Harmony (2009)
- I Was Here For a Moment, Then I Was Gone (2011)
- Fair Youth (2014)
- No Feeling Is Final (2021)

EPs

- Japanese Spy Transcript (EP) (XTAL JP) (August 2006)

Singles and minor releases

- Ann Arbor / Maybeshewill (split 7-inch single) (Field Records) (July 2006)
- "Seraphim & Cherubim"/"Heartflusters" (CD-R single) (Robot Needs Home) (September 2007)
- Anti-Semantics: The Remixes Vol. 1 (CD-R EP) (Robot Needs Home) (May 2008)
- Amateur Grammatics: The Remixes Vol. 2 (CD-R EP) (Robot Needs Home) (October 2008)
- Maybeshewill / Her Name is Calla (split 12-inch single) (Field Records) (November 2008)
- The Remixes 2005 – 2010 (CD-R album) (Robot Needs Home) (April 2010)
- "To The Skies From A Hillside" (7-inch single) (Field Records) (October 2010)
- "Critical Distance" (7-inch single) (Function Records) (March 2011)
- "Red Paper Lanterns" (7-inch single) (Function Records) (March 2012)

Compilations

- Kill All Humans (CD-R Compilation) (Robot Needs Home) (September 2007)
- Notes 1 (Mini CD-R and Art Compilation) (Notes) (Unknown 2009)
- Tellison – Contact! Contact! Remixed (Remix Compilation) (Drums Don't Kill Records) (January 2009)
- White Noise One (CD-R Compilation) (Robot Needs Home) (May 2009)
- Truck 12 (Compilation) (June 2009)
- Not for Want of Trying + 4 (Field Records UK & EU) (October 2009)
- White Noise Two (CD-R Compilation) (Robot Needs Home) (December 2009)
- Off The Cuff (Compilation) (Big Scary Monsters) (August 2010)
- Exports01 (Compilation) (Robot Needs Home) (June 2011)
- Live at koko
