= Not for Want of Trying =

Studio album by Maybeshewill
- Released: May 12, 2008
- Genre: Post-rock, alternative rock, post-metal, electronica
- Length: 35:56
- Label: Field

Maybeshewill chronology
Japanese Spy Transcript (2006)	Not for Want of Trying (2008)	Sing the Word Hope in Four-Part Harmony (2009)

Professional ratings
Review scores
Source	Rating
AllMusic	3.5/5 stars
Drowned in Sound	(8/10)
Rock Sound	(8/10)

Not for Want of Trying is the debut album from UK instrumental rock band Maybeshewill, released on 12 May 2008.

== Track listing ==
No.	Title	Length
1.	"Ixnay on the Autoplay"	1:42
2.	"Seraphim & Cherubim"	3:16
3.	"The Paris Hilton Sex Tape"	3:34
4.	"I'm in Awe, Amadeus!"	3:39
5.	"We Called for an Ambulance but a Fire Engine Came"	3:23
6.	"Heartflusters"	3:48
7.	"C.N.T.R.C.K.T."	2:26
8.	"He Films the Clouds Pt. 2"	6:42
9.	"Not for Want of Trying"	5:33
10.	"Takotsubo"	1:49

== Production ==
The title track "Not for Want of Trying" samples Howard Beale's "mad as hell" speech from the 1976 film Network.
