= I Was Here For a Moment, Then I Was Gone =

Studio album by Maybeshewill
- Released: 11 June 2011
- Label: Function

Maybeshewill chronology
Sing the Word Hope in Four-Part Harmony (2009)	I Was Here For a Moment, Then I Was Gone (2011)	Fair Youth (2014)

Professional ratings
Aggregate scores
Source	Rating
Metacritic	76/100
Review scores
Source	Rating
NME	3.5/5 stars
PopMatters	7/10
Rock Sound	8/10
SputnikMusic	4/5 stars

I Was Here for a Moment, Then I Was Gone is the third studio album by English post-rock band Maybeshewill. It was released on 11 June 2011 by Function Records.

== Critical reception ==
I Was Here for a Moment, Then I Was Gone was met with "generally favorable" reviews from critics. At Metacritic, which assigns a weighted average rating out of 100 to reviews from mainstream publications, this release received an average score of 76 based on 4 reviews.

In a review for NME, critic reviewer Abby Tayleure wrote: "Their first studio-recorded album, after working on the other two in a spare bedroom, took a grand total of 18 months to put together and is reminiscent of the likes of 65daysofstatic, Mogwai and Glassjaw. Epic guitars, crashing drums and intense keys – it’s a dramatic record that will shake your bones. Tim Newbound of Rock Sound called the release the "most ball-bustingly intense and breathtakingly beautiful thing" the band has ever done.

== Track listing ==
I Was Here for a Moment, Then I Was Gone track listing
No.	Title	Length
1.	"Opening"	1:58
2.	"Take This to Heart"	4:09
3.	"Red Paper Lanterns"	4:17
4.	"Critical Distance"	4:12
5.	"Accolades"	4:24
6.	"An End to Camaraderie"	4:09
7.	"Words for Arabella"	4:06
8.	"Farewell, Sarajevo"	5:14
9.	"Relative Minors"	6:22
10.	"To the Skies from a Hillside"	5:11

Japanese bonus tracks
No.	Title	Length
11.	"Спутник-2"	3:05
12.	"I'm in Awe Amadeus" (Acoustic)	3:48
