= The Bomb Party =

English rock band

The Bomb Party were an English rock band from Leicester. They have been described as "The Godfathers of Grebo".

== History ==
The band formed in the early 1980s, initially as Farmlife by Andy "Jesus" Mosquera (guitar), Peter Swaine (vocals), Steve Gerrard (guitar), Laurence Wood (sax), James Hunt(bass) and Mark Thompson (drums), who met on a fine art course at Leicester Polytechnic. They underwent lineup changes and then released one single under this name in 1982, "Susie's Party" (later covered by Yeah Yeah Noh); A second single on Dan Treacy's Whaam! label was withdrawn. In 1984 Farmlife split up, and Andy "Jesus" Mosquera (vocals), Steve Gerrard (guitar), Mark Thompson (drums) formed The Bomb Party, with Sarah Corina (bass). They took their name from a Graham Greene novel, debuting in 1985 with the Ray Gun EP on the Abstract label, the new sound described as "a Molotov cocktail of hardcore grebo gothability lying somewhere between The Cramps and Bauhaus". The bandmembers themselves rejected the "grebo (music)" tag, Mosquera stating "We're not grebos and we're not bikers or any of that shit. We're experimental. We are experimentalists but we don't have to say we're political and we credit our audience with enough intelligence to suss it out for themselves". The debut album Drugs appeared in 1986. Signing to the Workers Playtime label, they released a second album, 1987's Liberace Rising, now featuring Leszek Rataj on guitar and keyboards, preceded by a compilation of their early Abstract singles, The Last Supper. A year later they signed to Normal records, releasing their most commercial record, a cover of The Archies' "Sugar Sugar" (featuring Voice Of The Beehive on backing vocals) followed in 1989 by the album, Fish. A final album, Nativity #3 appeared on Artlos in 1990, the band split up immediately after it was recorded. The band played their final gig at The Powerhaus in London on 17 December 1989.

Thompson subsequently joined members of Gaye Bykers on Acid and The Janitors in the band G.R.O.W.T.H., who released the album For Lack Of Horses They Staddle Dogs. Mosquera reverted to a career in fine art. Corina joined The Mekons and, later, Striplight (with Alex Mitchell of Curve). She has also recorded with Bill Carter of Screaming Blue Messiahs.

== Discography ==
(chart placings shown are from the UK Independent Chart)

=== Singles ===
- "Susie's Party" (1982, 7", Dining Out) (as Farmlife)
- "Big Country" (1983, 7", Whaam!) (as Farmlife) (withdrawn)
- "Ray Gun EP" (1985, 12" EP, Abstract Records, 12 ABS 032) #32
- "The New Messiah" (1985, 12" EP, Abstract Records, 12 ABS 035) #30
- "Life's a Bitch" (1985, 7", Abstract Records, ABS 038)
- "Pretty Face" (1987, 7", Workers Playtime, WP CS 001)
- "Sugar Sugar" (1988, 7", Normal Records, NORMAL 93 T)
- "Why Don't You Behave" (1989, 7", Normal Records, NORMAL 103 S)

=== Albums ===
- Drugs (1986, Abstract Records, ABT 014) #18

Side One
01 Kill Your Wife
02 Don't Die Keith
03 Johnny Took Her Breath Away
04 Jesus Was A Pinko
05 Gas
06 Johnny Nero

Side Two
01 Susie's Party
02 Our Love Is Pushing Up Daisies
03 Zombie Head
04 Slide
05 Refuge

- Liberace Rising (1987, Workers Playtime, Play LP2)

Spanking Side
01 Devil's Child
02 My Degeneration
03 Make Way For My Motorbike Baby
04 Desperation
05 I Wanna Be Abused
06 Pretty Face

Rubber Side
01 Crawl
02 Don't
03 Come On And Get Closer
04 Evil Eye
05 El Savor Del Amor
06 Metropolis

- Fish (1988, Normal Records, NORMAL 103)

Side One
01 Praise The Lord
02 LSD
03 Some Bodies
04 Venus In Dirt
05 The Last Waltz
06 Do The Right Thing
Side Two
01 Theme From God Bless America
02 Mephistopheles (A Million Worth Of Pillion)
03 Shakespeare
04 Why Don't We Talk
05 Love At Any Price
06 The Only Rule (There Is No Rule)
07 Car Crash (On The Highway Of Love)

- Nativity #3 (1990, Artlos Recs, ARTLOS/EFA LP 01819)

Side One
01 The Beginning And The End
02 Ship Of Fools
03 Hey Joe
04 31st Of September
05 Lucy Gas
06 Unavoidably Detained
07 Dreaming

Side Two
01 Gimme Summat To Love
02 Use It
03 In This Land
04 Touched
05 Tonight
06 The Beginning And The End

=== Compilations ===
- The Last Supper (1986, LP, Abstract Records, ABT 016)

Track listing

Side One

01 Harry the Babysitter

02 Ray Gun

03 Knocking

04 Get Lost My Love

05 Fever

06 Life's A Bitch (English)

07 Hell Sucks

Side Two

01 New Messiah

02 Wasted

03 Get So Down

04 Yeah Yeah Yeah

05 Great White Hope

06 Man Hole

07 Life's A Bitch (Spanish)
