= My Secret Life (Billy Ruffian album) =

Studio album by Billy Ruffian
- Released: May 2007
- Recorded: Home Recording, Stretford, Manchester Late 2006 - May 2007
- Genre: Alternative rock, Indie
- Length: 48:41
- Label: FLA Records
- Producer: Paul Greenhalgh

Billy Ruffian chronology
'Death of a Band (single)' (2006)	My Secret Life (2007)	'Spring Sampler' (2007)

Singles from My Secret Life
- 1. "Death of a Band/Leaving Soon/Preensters/(My Girlfriend is Like a) Trojan Horse" Released: April 2006; 2. "Death of a Band/Preensters(My Girlfriend is Like a) Trojan Horse" Released: June 2006; 3. "Music vs Money/Whipping Boy/My Secret Life" Released: June 2007; 4. "Masterminding My Downfall/Twenty Eighth Month/Debtor's Lament" Released: October 2008

Professional ratings
Review scores
Source	Rating
High Voltage	3/5 bolts
Manchester Music Online	4/5 stars

My Secret Life was the debut album by the British indie band Billy Ruffian. It was released in 2007.

== Track listing ==
1. "Music vs Money" — Billy Ruffian
2. "Don’t Want You" — Billy Ruffian/Atkinson
3. "Death of a Band" — Billy Ruffian
4. "The Apothecary" — Billy Ruffian
5. "Youth Club" — Bray/Burrow/Evaskitas
6. "Masterminding My Downfall" — Billy Ruffian/Bridle
7. "Leaving Soon" — Billy Ruffian
8. "Ballad of Billy Ruffian" — Billy Ruffian
9. "Turn Your Head" — Billy Ruffian
10. "Whipping Boy" — Bray/Evaskitas
11. "(My Girlfriend is Like a) Trojan Horse" — Billy Ruffian
12. "The Last Day" — Billy Ruffian

== Personnel ==
- Stephen Ruffian – vocals, guitar
- Thom Cuell – lead guitar,
- Ben Paul – bass guitar, drum programming
- Steve Trumpet – trumpet
