= Kids Love Lies =

Background information
- Origin: London, England
- Genres: Pop punk, Power pop
- Years active: 2007—2010
- Label: Cherryade Records
- Members: Ellen Murphy; Leigh Harrison; Matty Saywell; Will Jones
- Past members: Claudia Mansaray; Raf Singer
- Website: Myspace page

Kids Love Lies were a London pop punk band from November 2007 to July 2010.

== Line up ==
The founding lineup of Kids Love Lies was Ellen Murphy (vocals), Leigh Harrison (guitar), Claudia Mansaray (bass guitar), Matty Saywell (guitar) and Raf Singer (drums), based in London. They formed as Kids Love Lies in November 2007. After auditioning around 10 singers, Ellen replied to an advert on Gumtree and auditioned several songs that the band sent her. New drummer Will Jones joined the band in January 2010, replacing Raf Singer, who departed in October 2009. Claudia Mansaray left the band in April 2010. The band announced their split in July 2010.

Murphy went on to perform as Only Girl, including a collaboration with Zero 7.

== Sound ==
NME said that "Firecracker singer Ellen Murphy sounds pretty much like Kate Nash would if she dropped the prim and proper act and thrashed herself into a full on Kathleen Hanna hissy fit." The Guardian's Guide has compared them to Bow Wow Wow. Tasty Fanzine said of single Count in my Head to "think Chiara L’s or a slightly more wired version of Scanners." They were influenced by Pretty Girls Make Graves, The Slits, Sleater-Kinney, and the Yeah Yeah Yeahs.

== Performances ==
They played Radio 1's Big Weekend on 10 May 2009 after being put forward by BBC Kent Introducing, the Artrocker stage at The Great Escape Festival in Brighton on 16 May 2009, and on the BBC Introducing stage at the Sellindge Music Festival in Kent on 7 June 2009. Their final live performance was at the Old Blue Last in Shoreditch, London in July 2010. They played live alongside Fight Like Apes, Scanners, The Holloways, Theoretical Girl, My Tiger My Timing, The Kabeedies, A Genuine Freakshow and Goldheart Assembly.

=== Airplay ===
They were played on BBC 6 Music by Tom Robinson and Marc Riley, on BBC Radio 1 by Zane Lowe, Nick Grimshaw, Huw Stephens and Steve Lamacq, on BBC Radio Kent's Introducing show by Jim Bursey and Jacob Rickard, and on Dublin's Phantom FM. They recorded a live session at the BBC's Maida Vale Studios for Huw Stephens' In New Music We Trust. They played a session on Earwax Radio on 22 October 2008.

Their music was featured in the BBC Switch soap opera The Cut.

== Releases ==
They self-released the Demo '08 CD on 30 January 2008, and self-released an EP, Switch Off, on 30 August 2008. Times Online said at the time that "they're already delivering fine power pop that's packed full of clever lyrics and hooks - they're surely ones to watch."

Their first signed release, Count in My Head, was released on 13 April 2009 by Cherryade Records, and was a BBC Kent Introducing single of the week, featured in the New Blood section of Artrocker Magazine/Converse Music, recommended by music critic Everett True, and an NME Top Ten Track. The video was made up of 3,500 photo stills.

The band's second single, Under The Bed, was released on 12 October 2009, also on Cherryade, with a video that pays homage to 80s B movies and David Lynch films. It was track of the day on The Times online on 4 November 2008, prior to its release and a Pick of the Month for Who's Jack Magazine in April 2009. Times Online said "they're already delivering fine power pop that's packed full of clever lyrics and hooks - they're surely ones to watch." Altsounds said it is "brimming with a cacophony of relentless, frenetic guitars, an energetic bassline and crashing percussion, all topped off by Ellen Murphy’s Karen O-esque vocals." It was single of the month in October 2009's Artrocker Magazine, and record of the week on the BBC Kent Introducing show.

The Stars EP was released in June 2010 on Cherryade, featuring the tracks "Stars", "Stop", "White Flag Down", and an acoustic version of "Stars". Artrocker called the title track "hyperspeed indie rock with singer Ellen Murphy kung fu kicking her way outta the speakers." The EP was launched at The Heavenly Social in Central London.
