= Canterbury (band) =

English rock band

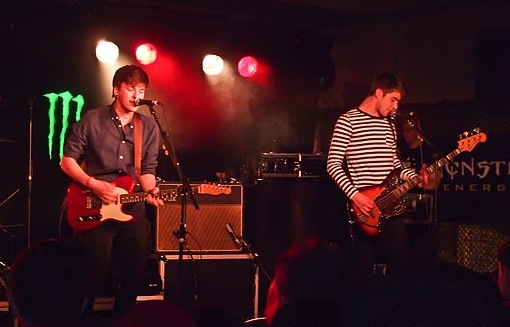

Background information
- Origin: Basingstoke, Hampshire, England
- Genres: Alternative rock
- Years active: 2005–2014
- Label: Hassle
- Members: Luke Prebble; Mike Sparks; James Pipe; Chris Velissarides
- Past members: Ben Bishop; Scott Peters
- Website: thisiscanterbury.com

Canterbury were an English rock band, formed in Basingstoke, Hampshire, in 2005. The band consisted of guitarist and vocalist Mike Sparks, bassist and vocalist Luke Prebble, guitarist James Pipe and drummer Chris Velissarides.

== History ==
=== Formation (2005–2008) ===
Canterbury was founded in 2005, by Ben Bishop, James Pipe and Luke Prebble, who all attended the same college (Lord Wandsworth College in Hook, Hampshire). They were later joined by Mike Sparks after he left his previous band. The line up was completed by fellow Music Tech classmate Scott Peters in early 2007. They spent their remaining few years of education writing songs for what would eventually become their first album four years later in 2009. After leaving college they began to take the band more seriously, touring all around the United Kingdom and promoting themselves through social-media formats, including Facebook and Myspace.

After leaving college, they began touring relentlessly for the next four years playing hundreds of shows around the UK and Ireland. Starting off in opening slots for anyone who would have them, they progressed to slots on much higher-profile UK-wide tours with groups including The Automatic, Enter Shikari, Against Me, Twin Atlantic, You Me at Six and We Are The Ocean.

=== Thank You and Calm Down (2009–2011) ===
In May 2009, the band released a music video for the first single "Eleven, Twelve". The release went alongside their support of Billy Talent in October of that year.

On 23 November 2009, Canterbury released their debut album Thank You. The album was recorded by the band across November and December 2007. The delayed release was based on them wanting to build a fan base before releasing the album. The band decided they would put the album up for free download via their website and encourage people to promote the album. When asked about why the band released it for free, Prebble said, "I don't think you can really expect to make people pay for a single or an album if you're a very small band." The album was downloaded over 3,000 times in the first three days of release.

The band began a headline tour to support the album in February 2010 with The Hot Melts and This City. On 26 February 2010, the band released a new single "Gloria" for free download.

The band's touring schedule was a lot smaller in 2011 as they spent a lot of the time recording their second studio album. Since the release of Thank You they have been working on a follow-up, releasing an EP on iTunes containing three songs. Their first EP Calm Down was released on 25 October 2010 and contained three tracks: "Calm Down", "Trainers" and "Your Face is in HD". This was followed up a year later on 31 October 2011 with More Than Know, their second three-track EP featuring the songs "More than Know", "Routine" and "Lost in the Basement".

=== Heavy in the Day (2012–2013) ===
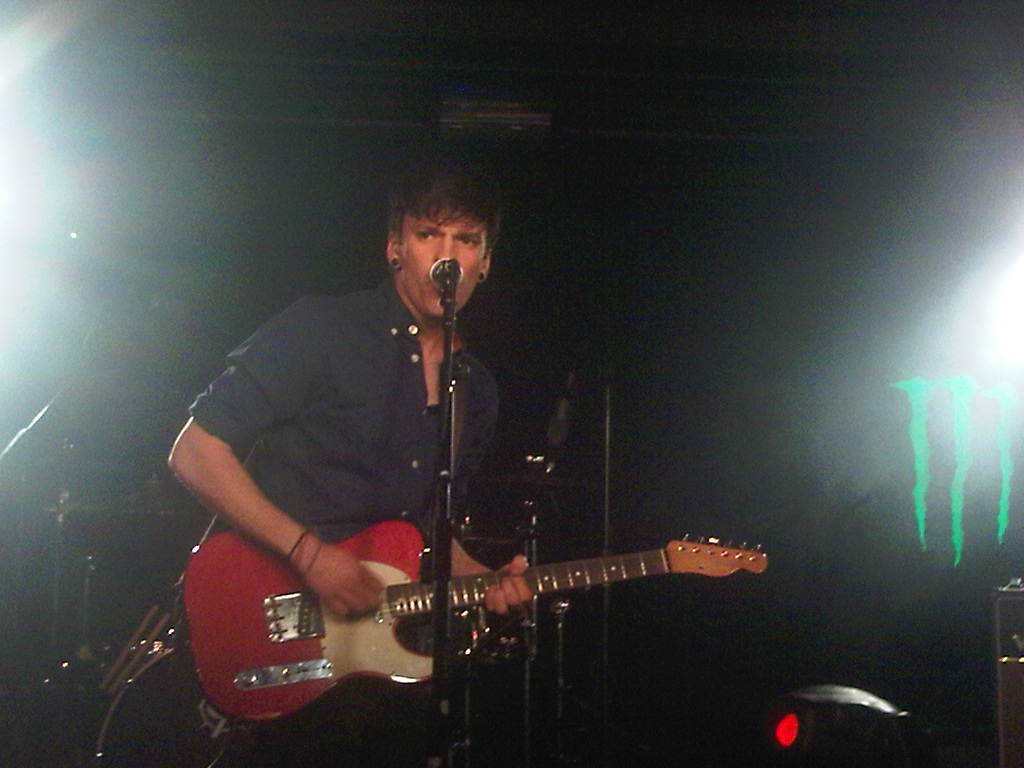
Singer and guitarist Mike Sparks performing in Southampton 2012.

To coincide with the new year they released the single "Ready Yet?" on 16 January 2012.

On 25 April 2012, the band announced the name, release date, album art and track list of their second studio album, Heavy in the Day, via their website along with a release party on 19 July at the Barfly in Camden, London. The album was released on 9 July and features new material alongside songs previously released as singles. The album was recorded in Devon and produced by Peter Miles and released through Sweet Lime Records with a single titled "Saviour" released ahead on 25 June.

In January and February 2012 they toured the UK on a headline tour with support from Proxies. In November 2012, the group were the main support band on Deaf Havana's tour in the UK and in late November through to mid-December 2012 they embarked upon a headline tour of their own in support of Heavy in the Day with support from Mallory Knox and Scholars.

On 8 April, the band announced news of their new album via their Twitter and Facebook accounts via the Pledge Music project. At the same time Hassle Records announced their signing of Canterbury.

Canterbury parted ways with their drummer Scott Peters in May 2013. He was replaced by ex All Forgotten member Chris Velissarides.

=== Dark Days and disbandment (2014) ===
On 13 January 2014 the band released their new album, Dark Days, celebrated with an acoustic session at Banquet Records the night before and a launch show at The Hospital Club. On 19 January 2014, Dark Days reached no.1 on the UK Official Charts Rock albums and reached no. 84 on the UK Official Album chart. On 1 October 2014 the band announced that they would not be continuing to make music in the foreseeable future on their website. They announced their final three shows in Birmingham, Manchester and London for December. At this final show in London on 19 December, the band were rejoined by original members Ben Bishop and Scott Peters.

== Band members ==
Former members

- Luke Prebble – lead vocals, bass guitar (2005–2014)
- Mike Sparks – vocals, guitar (2005–2014)
- James Pipe – guitar (2005–2014)
- Chris Velissarides – drums, percussion (2013–2014)
- Ben Bishop – bass guitar (2005–2010)
- Scott Peters – drums (2007–2013)

== Discography ==
=== Albums ===
- Thank You (23 November 2009)
- Heavy in the Day (9 July 2012)
- Dark Days (14 January 2014)

=== Singles ===
- "Eleven, Twelve" (18 May 2009)
- "Set You Right" (2 July 2009)
- "Eleven, Twelve / Friends? We're More Like A Gang" (25 October 2009)
- "Gloria" (26 February 2010)
- "Calm Down" (25 October 2010)
- "More Than Know" (31 October 2011)
- "Ready Yet?" (16 January 2012)
- "Ready Yet? (Proxies Remix)" (19 May 2012)
- "Saviour" (25 June 2012)
- "Something Better" (13 September 2012)
- "You Are The One" (8 April 2013)

=== Extended plays ===
- "Calm Down" (25 October 2010)
- "More Than Know" (31 October 2011)
- "Saviour" (25 June 2012)
- "Satellite" (2013)

== See also ==
- List of bands from England
- List of indie-rock musicians
- British rock music
