= Sing the Word Hope in Four-Part Harmony =

Studio album by Maybeshewill
- Released: 1 June 2009
- Genre: Post-rock, math rock, post-metal, electronica
- Length: 38:02
- Label: Field; XTAL

Maybeshewill chronology
Not for Want of Trying (2008)	Sing the Word Hope in Four-Part Harmony (2009)	I Was Here For a Moment, Then I Was Gone (2011)

Professional ratings
Review scores
Source	Rating
Rock Sound	7/10 stars

Sing the Word Hope in Four-Part Harmony is the second album by the British instrumental rock band Maybeshewill, released in June 2009.

== Track listing ==
No.	Title	Length
1.	"You Can't Shake Hands with a Clenched Fist"	2:43
2.	"Co-Conspirators"	4:06
3.	"This Time Last Year"	4:05
4.	"Accept and Embrace"	6:24
5.	"How to Have Sex with a Ghost"	3:29
6.	"Our History Will Be What We Make of It"	3:14
7.	"Last Time This Year"	5:51
8.	"Sing the Word Hope in Four-Part Harmony"	8:10

Japanese Edition Bonus Tracks
No.	Title	Length
9.	"This Time Last Year (Live)"
10.	"Japanese Spy Transcript (Live)"
11.	"Not for Want of Trying (Live)"
12.	"He Films the Clouds Pt. 2 (Live): Live @ Kashiwa Drunkard's Stadium"
