= Lee Harrison (disambiguation) =

Lee Harrison (born 1971) is an English footballer.

Lee Harrison may also refer to:

- Lee Harrison III (1929–1998), pioneer in analog electronic animation
- Lee Harrison (rugby union) (born 1977)

== See also ==
- Leigh Harrison (disambiguation)
- Liam Harrison (disambiguation)
