= White Light Parade =

White Light Parade are an English alternative rock band from Bradford, West Yorkshire, England. The band originally consisted of brothers Danny Yates (lead vocals/lead guitar) and Jono Yates (vocals/rhythm guitar), with Tom Emmett (bass) and Nici Todd (drums). Due to differences, their original drummer Nici Todd is no longer in the band and has been replaced by long-time friend and session drummer Mark Lewalski.

White Light Parade were signed to the London-based independent record label, Split Records. The band has supported and toured the UK and Europe with bands such as Fightstar, The Subways, Twin Atlantic, Ash, The Twang, The Enemy, and Kasabian. They have also played shows including The Cockpit in Leeds and were also on the bill for Bingley Music Live alongside members from The Jam and The Bluetones.

They released their Limited Edition debut single "Wait for the Weekend" in February 2008, which charted at No. 17 on the UK Indie Chart, as well as receiving critical acclaim and support from XFM. The follow-up single, "Turning All The Lights Down", released in May 2008, reached No. 6 in the UK Indie Chart and spent three weeks in the Top 40. The single received support from Huw Stephens on BBC Radio 1. "Riot in The City", the b-side to their debut single, was featured on the Rockstar Games video game, Grand Theft Auto IV. White Light Parade have collaborated with Sonic Boom Six and Itch, from The King Blues, on the b-side "Rebellion Call".

The band's debut album House of Commons was released in the UK on 25 May 2009 and was produced by Pete Miles (The King Blues).

After a brief hiatus, White Light Parade returned with a new single, "Want You To Know", released in early 2012. The new material was produced by Sean Genocky.

In 2015 they released their second album "Favour the Brave".

== Discography ==
=== Singles ===
- "Wait for the Weekend" (UK #86
- "Turning All The Lights Down" (UK #65)
- "Wake Up" (UK #76)
- "We Start Fires"

=== Albums ===
- House of Commons (2009)
- Favor the Brave (2015)
