= Los (band) =

British indie rock band

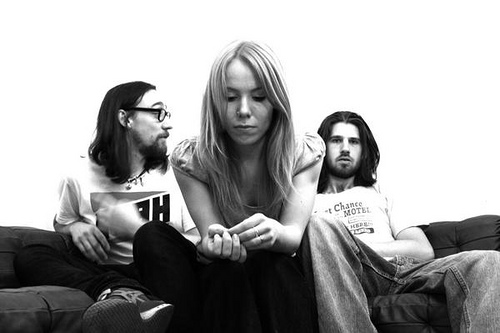

Background information
- Origin: Reigate, Surrey, UK
- Genres: Rock; Blues; Indie
- Years active: 2008–2011
- Members: Helen Sargent; Daniel Hale; Chris Hamilton
- Website: http://www.wearelos.com

Los was a British indie rock band, formed and based in Surrey. As of 2008, the band comprises Helen Sargent (vocals and synth), Daniel Hale (drums) and Chris Hamilton (guitars). Their distinctive sound has been described as a mixture of rock, punk, blues and grunge, citing influences such as Jeff Buckley, Led Zeppelin, Nirvana and Nina Simone. The band has toured the UK and released two singles in 2008. They toured the UK four more times in 2009 before recording their debut five track E.P 'Whale' released in late 2009, which was play listed on BBC Radio 6 Music and XFM Radio and achieved 9/10 in the November 2009 issue of Rocksound Magazine. BBC Radio 6 Music's Tom Robinson described 'Ba Ba Ba' as 'Quite Brilliant' on his Twitter page before inviting the band in for a live radio interview. The band changed their name to That Mouth in May 2011 after clashes on iTunes with an American rapper going by the same name. It was officially announced on 25 September 2011 that after the release of their full-length debut album 'Sometimes I feel like I've lost my soul' on limited edition 12" vinyl on 10 October 2011, the band would be parting ways to pursue other musical projects.

== Discography ==
- "My Hands Smell of Smoke" / "Under the Dragon's Wing" 7" AA-side & Download (30 April 2008) – Self Release (LOS001)
- "Ba Ba Ba" 7" & Download (November 2008) – Self Release (LOS002)
- "Whale" 5 Track E.P CD & Download (October 2009) – Self Release (LOS003)
