= Won Mississippi =

Won Mississippi is an alternative post hardcore band based in Berwick-Upon-Tweed, UK. The group, which formed in 2001, consists of Patrick Baird (vocals), Rob Wilkinson (guitars), Dan Richards (bass) and Adam Roberts (drums).

== History ==
Won Mississippi quickly created a strong fan-base in North East England, and started to gig regularly across Southern and Central Scotland. They also performed consistently in Newcastle upon Tyne supporting several bands including Mavis, Josephine and Antihero. They have also supported the American indie band, Death Cab for Cutie and Scottish indie supremos Stapleton.

They formed in October 2000 and released their first album (Sleeping spoons) in February 2001. They followed this with the two track e.p. "Next Weeks Antiques." In 2003, they signed with Hackpen Records and released their second album in the autumn of that year. Welcomes Careful Drivers was met with critical acclaim, with several tracks from the album being played on Radio 1 sessions in both Scotland and Ireland. In 2005 the album was selected by Is This Music? magazine as one of the 100 greatest rock albums in Scottish history and received a 4K review in top U.K. rock magazine KERRANG!. They released an internet e.p. called "Futureproof y'rself" in 2005 and may be released in physical form (possibly 7" single) sometime in 2009.

Won Mississippi completed their new full-length album (Their first in 5 years) called "We are, are we not natives?" in early summer 2009. Several tracks were showcased on Scottish radio station Leith FM and Korea based AMS Tunes podcast Listen or die.

At the tail end of 2009, top music site jockrock.com listed Welcomes Careful Drivers as number 7 in their Top Scottish albums of the naughties chart. Sleeping Spoons also appeared at number 27.

== Discography ==
Sleeping Spoons (2001) Next Week's Antiques (2002) Welcomes Careful Drivers (2003Hackpen Records) Futureproof y'rself (2005) We Are, Are We Not, Natives (2009)

== Side Projects ==
In 2007 Rob Wilkinson joined the band, Ditch Your Sidekicks, another Berwick based group who are currently performing regularly in the area and gathering material for a debut album. Rob also plays for Tobias The Band which are tantalisingly described as Alt.country/gothic/punk with garage gospel overtones.
