= Silent Jack =

- Origin: Birmingham, England
- Genres: Heavy metal, Hard rock, Glam metal
- Years active: 2009–present
- Members: Rich 'Stitch' Mason; Adam Carson; Dickie Spider; Scott Carson
- Website: http://www.Silent-Jack.com

Silent Jack are a British hard rock band formed in Birmingham, England, in 2009. They have been described as 'Ones to Watch' who are 'bringing a dead era back to life'.

== History ==
=== Early years and "Hot Luvin'" (2009–2012) ===
The band formed in 2009 when a fledgling rock band was started by brothers Adam and Scott Carson and some school friends. When their advert for a vocalist was answered by Rich 'Stitch' Mason, they had a full lineup and began to play local gigs around Birmingham and the local area, slowly gaining a reputation and a small following. The lineup would fluctuate over the next couple of years until the arrival of Dickie Spider on bass guitar in October 2011. The band completed their first tour in January 2012, entitled the "Fake it till you make it 2012 tour".

On 28 September 2012, the band released their debut single "Hot Luvin", which received mainly positive reviews from the rock and metal press.

=== Snakebite EP (2013) ===
Mid 2013 saw the release of two promotional singles, entitled "Going Down", and "Angels Cry". These were released, free of charge, via the band's website and are currently still available. Both releases had positive reception, "Going Down" especially, even in Australia, and have been played on various unsigned radio stations, including TBFM Online. These releases were supported by tours which saw the band play various cities around the UK. The Some Hot Luvin' Going Down Tour was recorded in a series of video diaries which the band released on YouTube.

In July of that year Silent Jack also released a digital only single, entitled "Love Factory". The plan was to release various digital singles throughout the year, to ensure a steady output of music, and then follow up with an EP that would have a physical release. On 22 December 2013, Silent Jack released Snakebite, a seven track EP compiling previously released tracks as well as some new cuts. The title and artwork were based on a tattoo on Scott's arm, featuring a King Cobra (King Cobra being the second track on the EP).

=== Debut album (2014–present) ===
In August 2014, Silent Jack confirmed through their Facebook page that they have been in the studio recording material. They subsequently released Play the Game in 2015.

In 2016, Silent Jack co-headlined Redrock Festival, a new festival in Camden, London hosted by Redwire with the aim of creating a greater sense of community around the unsigned music scene for band members and the audience alike.

== Members ==
- Rich 'Stitch' Mason – Vocals, Occasional Guitar
- Adam Carson – Lead Guitar
- Dickie Spider– Bass
- Scotty Carson – Drums, Backing Vocals

== Discography ==
- "Hot Luvin'" - Maxi single (2012)
- "Going Down" - Promo single (2013)
- "Angels Cry" - Promo single (2013)
- Girls, Fire & Hairspray - Compilation featuring "Going Down" (2013)
- "Love Factory" - Single (2013)
- Snakebite - EP (2013)
- Play the Game - Album (2015)
- Redrock Festival 2016 - Compilation featuring "Play The Game" (2016)

== Tours ==
- Fake It Till You Make It Tour (2012)
- Some Hot Luvin Going Down Tour (2013)
- Even Angels Cry Tour (2013)
- Road To Ruin Tour (2014)
