= The Reads =

British band

The Reads are an alternative rock band from North Wales and Chester, England. Their debut studio album, Stories from the Border, was released in 2011. Their follow up album Lost at Sea was released in 2014. Their third album Crossfire was released on 3 April 2020 as the UK went into lockdown. The pandemic delayed the album launch party by 18 months. Their music has been played on BBC Radio 2, BBC Radio Wales, BBC Radio Merseyside, XFM and Amazing Radio, amongst others. The track "Scarlet" featured on BBC 2's "Our Coast" in February, 2020. They list Doves, Elbow, Kraftwerk, Tangerine Dream, Pink Floyd, Boards of Canada, The Flaming Lips, The Beatles, The Bluetones, The Stone Roses, Aphex Twin, Spiritualized, Father John Misty, John Grant amongst their influences. High-profile fans include Jeremy Vine, Adrian Chiles, Janice Long and TV Chef, Bryn Williams.

== History ==
An early version of the band was formed in 2000 when school mates Marcel Delrue and Jamie Russell were introduced by a mutual friend to Stuart Bennett and Clare Stevenson who worked together at a local HMV store. They began playing together putting music to poems that Clare had written. In time brothers Matty Goddard and Chris Goddard parted ways with a previous band and joined The Reads. Throughout these early years the band played at local and city venues all over the North West and North Wales.

In March 2010, the band was approached by a friend who offered to fund the cost of recording their first studio album. Music Producer Jim Spencer, known for his work with Oasis, Doves and The Charlatans was enlisted to record and mix the album. The project was later joined by Joe Duddell who took time out from working with Mercury Prize winning band Elbow to come up with string and brass arrangements for five of the 12 songs. The album was mastered by Frank Arkwright who has worked with bands such as Arcade Fire, The Smiths and Gomez.

The album was played live for the first time at Telford's Warehouse a music venue in Chester to a sell out crowd.

Positive local reviews of the album attracted attention of BBC Radio Wales, leading to the song "Orange Days" being Single of the Week from 16 May 2011 and the band playing a Live In Session at the BBC studios in Cardiff on 27 June 2011. Their first single, "Good Omens" is also set to be Single of the Week from 1 August 2011. Further BBC radio airplay was gained through Jeremy Vine on The Jeremy Vine Show on BBC Radio 2.

They released their second album Lost at Sea in 2014 which featured singles played by BBC Radio 2, BBC Radio Wales and BBC Radio Merseyside. Once again, it was produced and mixed by Jim Spencer and mastered by Frank Arkwright at Abbey Road Studios.

There followed a period of inactivity with only a handful of gigs, before the band began work on a new album in spring 2018. This was recorded at Hope Mill Recording Studios, Manchester and EVE Studio, Stockport and was mixed and produced by Jim Spencer. Again, it was mastered by Frank Arkwright at Abbey Road Studios. Crossfire was released on 3 April 2020.

== Band members ==
- Marcel Delrue – Keyboards and programming
- Jamie Russell - Lead guitar, harmonica and backing vocals
- Stuart Bennett – Vocals and rhythm guitar
- Clare Stevenson – Bass guitar and lyricist
- Matty Goddard – Drums
- Clare "Fluff" Smith – Violin, strings and backing vocals

== Albums discography ==
- Stories from the Border (2011)
- Lost at Sea (2014)
- Crossfire (2020)
