= The Cold One Hundred =

English indie rock band

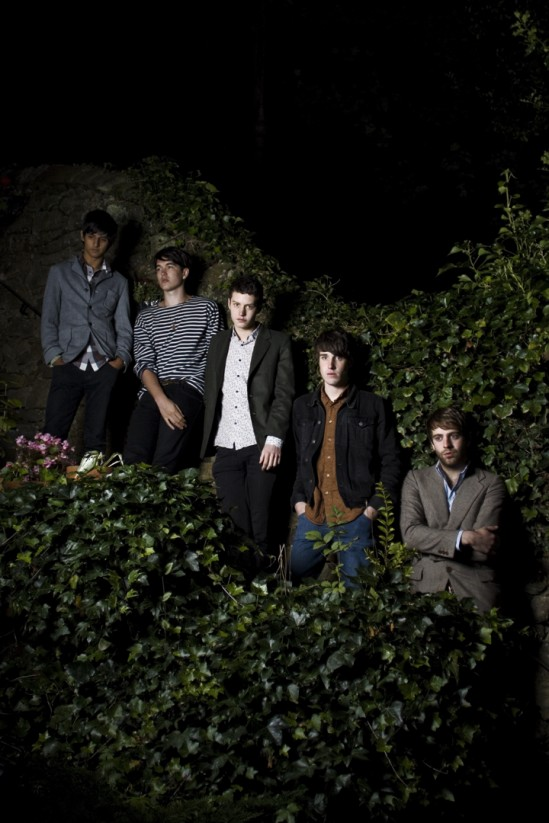

Background information
- Origin: Salford, England
- Genres: Indie
- Years active: 2010–present
- Members: Amory Neish Melling; Jake Ward; Joshua Harper; Jacob Walker; Samuel Dabrowski

The Cold One Hundred are an English indie rock band formed in Salford in early 2010. The band consist of Amory Neish-Melling (vocals), Jake Ward (guitar), Joshua Harper (guitar), Jacob Walker (bass) and Sam Dabrowski (drums).

A recent article printed in the Manchester Evening News said of the band: "Armed with a clutch of full-blooded romantic pop anthems... substance, along with intoxicating doses of idealism and romance, is something The Cold One Hundred clearly aren't lacking in. Combining Suede pomp, Clash punky freneticism and large splashes of Morrissey poetic swoon, The Cold One Hundred are classic Britpop elegance compacted into the neatest seven inch pop parcel... Make no mistake, as of 2011, The Cold One Hundred’s time is now."

== History ==
The Cold One Hundred first took shape when lead guitarist Jacob Ward and singer/lyricist Neish-Melling started bunking off University lectures to write songs, eventually roping in Harper, Walker and drummer Sam Dabrowski to complete the band line-up in February 2010. Within a month they were described as "A band with all the potential to break the mould of mundane Indie music".

The band's first demos, recorded at Sandhills Studios in Liverpool, received local acclaim as the band were hotly tipped as 'ones to watch' by Manchester-based High Voltage and Ark Magazines. The band has played live sessions for both BBC Radio Lancashire and BBC Radio Manchester, and were featured as The Guardian's New Band of The Day in March 2012.

The Cold One Hundred have played numerous gigs across the UK, including supports with The Vaccines, The Heartbreaks and Spector. The band supported Suede frontman Brett Anderson on his UK tour dates in October 2011. In summer 2012 they played slots at Kendal Calling and Tramlines festivals.
