= Perfume (British band) =

British indie band

- Origin: Leicester, England
- Genres: Alternative rock, indie
- Years active: 1993–1997
- Labels: Aromasound, Big Star
- Spinoff of: Blab Happy
- Past members: Mick McCarthy; Tony Owen; Karl Traae; John Waddington; Rob Waddington

Perfume were a British indie group from Leicester, active between 1993 and 1997.

== History ==
When Blab Happy split up, singer/guitarist Mick McCarthy and bassist Tony Owen recruited John Waddington to form Perfume, initially releasing records on their own "Aromasound" label. Beginning with scented limited edition vinyl, they enjoyed a string of Indie Top 10 hits. Their first release was "Yoga/Perfume” in December 1993, the white label was played repeatedly on Radio 1 by Steve Lamacq and Jo Whiley. Second single "Young/Anointed” (which was also perfume-scented) appeared in April 1994. Third single "Lover" was picked up on by BBC Radio One DJ's Steve Lamacq and Jo Whiley (the latter getting the band in to record a session for her show).

The next two singles stormed the Indie Top 10: "Lover" (Steve Lamacq’s Single of the Week) and "Yesterday Follows You" established the band as radio favourites and NME and Melody Maker did full features on the band including What's going On the NME stereo Top 10. The video for "Yesterday Follows You" was featured on ITV's Chart Show and their next headline tour saw shows sell out all over the UK. Perfume recorded songs at BBC Maida Vale for a week long session for Steve Lamacq and Jo Whiley.

Perfume drew a crowd of over 5,000 at the second stage at the Phoenix Festival. They co-headlined with Travis and toured as a headline act selling out many venues in the UK and were invited to play abroad at events such as the Black Sessions in Paris. The recruitment of bass player Karl Traae of Leicester's HBM and recently returned from a stint in the US with San Diego's Whirl lead to another Indie Top 10 (UK Chart Top 75) hit in January 1996 with the single "Haven't Seen You". After that, they signed to Big Star Records, and to Paul Weller's publishers Notting Hill, who reissued "Lover" to be followed by the debut album One in 1997, which received glowing reviews in Q and Select magazines. Perfume performed on the NME stage at the Glastonbury Festival in 1997. After a lengthy record company takeover the band's final release was a posthumous "best of" compilation, Yesterday Rising, released on Aromasound in 1998. Perfume were Paul Weller's special guests at his Lazy Sunday Afternoon in Finsbury Park. Jo Whiley joined the band on stage at BBC Camden Live Festival to add handclaps to "Lover", a song she described as "The sweetest song in all the world." Steve Lamacq and Jo Whiley included the interview with Perfume when the band surprised Whiley for her birthday as one of their highlights in the 20 years of The Evening Session programs in 2014.

"Lover" was featured on the 2010 Common People indie compilation and was described by Luke Lewis of the NME as a "lost gem." On NME.com he wrote an article called Rescue A Lost Classic about the song. "There is one track on the album that stopped me dead in my tracks. It's by Perfume and it's called 'Lover'. It's magnificent - an ecstatic, vernal bloom of falsetto and violins that gave me one of those powerful surges of nostalgia that critics always insist on calling a "Proustian rush."

Lover was chosen by Steve Lamacq for his 2019 Lost Alternatives album, receiving renewed airplay on BBC 6 Music and BBC Radio 2 from Steve Lamacq and on Jo Whiley and Simon Mayo.

In July 2020 the first edition of Speakeasy featured an article on Perfume, summing the band up as follows: “Throughout their four-year career, Perfume were lauded by the NME, Melody Maker, Select and Q, had multiple songs on the Indie Top-10 chart and on the Indie Top 20 CD compilations. If they were missed the first time around, with plaudits like these there’s never been a sweeter smelling time to right these wrongs.”

== Discography ==
=== Singles ===
- "Perfume/Yoga" (1993, Aromasound)
- "Young" (1994, Aromasound)
- "Lover" (1995, Aromasound) UK #158
- "Yesterday Follows You" (1995, Aromasound) UK #189
- "Haven't Seen You" (1996, Aromasound) UK #71
- "Carving Your Name" (1996, Aromasound) UK #77
- "Lover" (1997, Big Star) UK #99
- "You and I" (1997, Big Star) UK #147

=== Albums ===
- Yesterday Rising (1996?, Aromasound)
- One (1997, Big Star)
