= Proton computed tomography =

Proton computed tomography (pCT), or proton CT, is an imaging modality first proposed by Cormack in 1963 and initial experiment explorations identified several advantages over conventional X-ray CT (xCT). However, particle interactions such as multiple Coulomb scattering (MCS) and (in)elastic nuclear scattering events deflect the proton trajectory, resulting in nonlinear paths which can only be approximated via statistical assumptions, leading to lower spatial resolution than X-ray tomography. Further experiments were largely abandoned until the advent of proton radiation therapy in the 1990s which renewed interest in the topic due to the potential benefits of imaging and treating patients with the same particle.

== Description ==
Proton computed tomography (pCT) uses measurements of a proton's position/trajectory and energy before and after traversing an object to reconstruct an image of the object where each voxel represents the relative stopping power (RSP) of the material composition of the corresponding region of the object. The deviations of a proton's path inside the object are primarily due to interactions between the Coulomb fields of the proton and the nuclei in the absorbing material, resulting in many small-angle deflections as it passes through the object. Statistical models of the effect of MCS on the trajectory of a proton were developed to calculate the most likely path (MLP) of a proton given its entry and exit position/trajectory and corresponding uncertainty at intermediate depths within the object. Additional (in)elastic nuclear scattering events can also occur which cause larger angle deviations, which cannot easily be modeled, but these are fairly easy to identify and remove from consideration in the image reconstruction process.

With an approximate path of a proton through the object, one can then identify the voxels through which the proton passed, and the difference between entry and exit energy indicates the energy collectively deposited in these voxels. Assuming there are $J$ voxels in the image, the distance, $\Delta l_j$, the proton travels through each voxel $j\in J$ varies along the path and the amount of energy deposited in each voxel, $\Delta E_h$, depends on this and the voxel's RSP, $x_j$. The total energy loss $E$ is the line integral of RSP scaled by the intersection length, or

$E=\int x_j\Delta l_j$
