= Blab Happy =

British musical band

- Origin: Leicester, England
- Genres: Indie pop
- Years active: 1987–1993
- Labels: Wisdom, F-Beat
- Past members: Mick McCarthy; Jon Dennis; Tony Owen; Jeremy Clay

Blab Happy were a British indie band from Leicester formed in 1987, comprising Mick McCarthy, Jon Dennis, Tony Owen and Jeremy Clay. After two EPs released on their own Wisdom label won airplay on John Peel's BBC Radio 1 show, and enthusiastic reviews in New Musical Express, Sounds and Melody Maker, they were signed by Demon Records offshoot F-Beat, for whom they released 2 albums, 1991's Boat and 1993's Smothered. The NME's Gina Morris, wrote of the band: "Blab Happy are a cheerful Leicester four piece, smirking between That Petrol Emotion, Blur, and The Beatles". Blab Happy toured in their own right and as support to bands such as Radiohead, Kingmaker, and Squeeze. The band split up in 1993, with singer Mick McCarthy and bassist Tony Owen forming Perfume, who enjoyed the patronage of BBC Radio 1 DJs Steve Lamacq and Jo Whiley, having a minor hit in 1996 with "Haven't Seen You". Jon Dennis meanwhile formed Slinky, who also won airplay from Lamacq and Whiley with two singles produced by John Robb and were finalists in the 1995 In the City contest.

Dennis and Clay both went on to work as journalists – Dennis writing and presenting podcasts for The Guardian, and Clay for the Leicester Mercury. Clay has also written books, including "Blokes With Balls" and "The Burglar Caught by a Skeleton" Dennis currently records as part of Loaded Knife, whose 2 singles have won support from Rob Da Bank and Lamacq, and the late John Peel.

== Videos ==
- Valentine

== Discography ==
=== Singles ===
- "Turned Out Nice Again" (1987), Wisdom
- Fruits of Our Labour EP (1988), Wisdom
- Mad Surge EP (1991), F-Beat
- "Never No More" (1991), F-Beat
- "Down" (1991), F-Beat
- "Inside Out" (1992), F-Beat
- Blinding EP (1993), F-Beat

=== Albums ===
- Boat (1991), F-Beat (a limited edition LP version came with a bonus 12" EP and a poster)
1. Down
2. You Need Light
3. The Silent People
4. Inside Out
5. Fountain
6. Wisecrack Me Up
7. Valentine
8. Monkey Puzzle
9. Whose Driving Freefall
10. Someday Soon
11. Wisecrack Me Up (Reprise)
12. Valentia
13. Prospect Hill
14. Grief

Bonus 12" EP

1. Valentia
2. Prospect Hill
3. Grief
- Smothered (1993), F-Beat
1. Sean
2. Blinding
3. Seven Years
4. Bernadette
5. Soul Morning
6. Butcher
7. I Know It's Not Worth Listening
8. That's All
9. Smothered
10. The Hope Song #1
11. Tender Hooks
12. O Mary Love
13. The Hope Song #2
14. Fortune's Famous Fool
