= François Dolmetsch =

François Dolmetsch (born 4 October 1940) is a British photographer and musician.

== Career ==
Dolmetsch was born on 4 October 1940 in Haslemere, the eldest son of the early music pioneer and instrument maker Carl Dolmetsch and his wife Mary Dolmetsch. He received a degree in history from King's College, Cambridge in 1962 and in the same year moved to Cali, Colombia, with his wife Angela Cuevas whom he had met whilst she was studying in England.

In 1964 at the Festival Nacional de Arte in Cali, at that time a very catholic and conservative society, he was the first photographer to exhibitimages of the nude as fine art in Colombia and in 1967 he was the first photographer to show his work at the Bogotá Museum of Modern Art.

Since then, Dolmetsch has had solo exhibitions in numerous venues throughout Colombia, including the museums of modern art in Cali, Medellín, Pereira, Barranquilla, Cartagena, Santa Marta and Ibagué, as well as in galleries and museums in Scotland, the United States, the United Kingdom, Denmark, Mexico, Italy and France. His works are part of important private and public collections such as the Hermés Foundation and the Leticia & Stanislas Poniatowski Collection of Latin American Photography in France. Amongst the most important exhibitions were those at The Photographers' Gallery in London in 1972 and 1987, the Banco de la República in Bogotá in 2003 and the Museo de Arte La Tertulia in Cali, Colombia 2003.

From 1994 to 2001, Dolmetsch was artistic and executive director of the Orquesta Filarmónica de Cali (at that time called the Orquesta Sinfónica del Valle).

Dolmetsch has published two books: On the Other Side of the Moon with 56 monochrome photographies, and together with Miguel Gonzalez the retrospective François Dolmetsch with photographies from 1962 to 2003 which were exhibited at the Museo La Tertulia in Cali.

Dolmetsch lives with his wife Ángela in Cali.

== Publications ==
- François Dolmetsch: On the Other Side of the Moon. New York, 1979.
- François Dolmetsch, Miguel Gonzalez: François Dolmetsch Retrospective 1962–2003. Publisher: Museo La Tertulia (1 May 2003). ISBN 978-9583346361.
