= Hockley Hustle =

Cultural event in Nottingham, UK

The Hockley Hustle is an annual, one-day music and arts festival held at multiple venues in Nottingham and centred around the Hockley area. Running since 2006, it has raised over £150,000 for various charities and communities

== History ==
The festival began life in 2006 as part of Oxjam (a music festival raising money for Oxfam) and initially had seven venues involved. It has since grown, incorporating over 30 venues and more than 300 acts. Since its inception, it has raised over £150,000 for various local charities.

Past artists include Saint Raymond, Sheku Kanneh-Mason, and Jake Bugg. The latter two also took part in an online version of the festival held in 2020 during the coronavirus restrictions.

== Present day ==
After a two-year hiatus, Hockley Hustle returned in 2022.
