= Billy Ruffian (band) =

English indie rock band

- Origin: Manchester, England
- Genres: Alternative rock indie rock
- Years active: 2005–2011, 2013–
- Label: Filthy Little Angels
- Members: Stephen Ruffian; Thom Cuell; Rob Goodison; Andy Brownridge
- Website: Bandcamp

Billy Ruffian are an English indie rock band. Their debut album, My Secret Life, was released on 28 May 2007, with its accompanying single "Music vs. Money" following the next month. They went on hiatus in 2011, returning in 2013.

== Biography ==
The band began to take formation in July 2005 and, with a settled line-up, played their first gig in November that year. A steady stream of gigs followed from January 2006 and, following the release of a low-budget split EP entitled "Late Arrivals" in February, the band headed to a recording studio in March to record their first four tracks. The tracks – "Death of a Band", "Preensters", "Leaving Soon" and "(My Girlfriend Is Like A) Trojan Horse" were self-released by the band in April, with a second issue (omitting "Leaving Soon") following a couple of months later.

Some drastic line-up changes followed the re-release of ‘Death of a Band’, and by August the band was floundering, due to the departure of their drummer. It was not until October when, following an invitation to play at Chris Chinchilla’s farewell party, the band took the decision to carry on as a three piece (with drum machine). After a few shaky gigs, Billy Ruffian came to embrace the new technology and ‘Death of a Band’ finally found an official release on Filthy Little Angels’ Christmas compilation "Hark! The Filthy Angels Sing". This three-man lineup would remain stable for the next three years.

Having already recorded a few new tracks for another self-released EP, Billy Ruffian soon found themselves having to write and record several more tracks when Filthy Little Angels signed them up to record an album in January 2007.

Recorded during the Spring, My Secret Life was released at the end of May to varied reviews, including a 4 star ‘album of the week’ review from Manchester Music., a 3 star 'High Voltage' review as well as further positive reviews from Sandman magazine and Music Towers. Some other sources, however, were not so charitable; the band was also derided as a "pseudo-public school" outfit led by "some faux dandy in a cheap suit". The "Spring Sampler EP" featuring five FLA acts preceded the album and coincided with the band's first tour.

The next month, the songs "Music vs. Money" and "Whipping Boy" were taken from My Secret Life and released on an accompanying single along with the non-album cut "My Secret Life". The single was a split single with "The Art Goblins" as part of Filthy Little Angels’ Singles Club, and was awarded 'Single of the week' by the NME. The Billy Ruffian tracks were judged by many to be the best tracks in the package.

== David Davis ==
Struck by the shock factor of former Shadow Home Secretary David Davis’ resignation on 12 June 2008 to fight the Haltemprice and Howden by-election, BR vocalist Stephen Ruffian began writing lyrics on the subject the next day, from Davis’ own point of view. After finishing the lyrics with help from guitarist Thom, the band recorded the song on the 17th with their bassist/producer Ben Paul and, with a video compiled in a lengthy all-night session by Stephen, unleashed both song and video to the world via YouTube on Monday 23 June. An eleven-day turnaround from event to result.

Upon sending links to various blogs, interest in the song and video, "The Most Unlikely Civil Liberties Defender of All" snowballed. Political blogs throughout the land featured it, including that of Guido Fawkes, the most read political blogger in the UK. Interest culminated in a mention by John Humphrys on the Radio 4 Today Show on 27 June. Thom Cuell later blogged about this event on his website.

Intermittent recording continued towards the end of the year.

== Hiatus and beyond ==
Following the departure of their bassist/producer, re-recruitment of founder member Sam on guitar and movement of Thom from guitar to bass, the band rested, rehearsed and recreated more drum tracks for a while before returning later that year with a self-released song/video for "The Cat That Became Prime Minister" as well as having an older track chosen for a combined Oxfam/Manchester Music Christmas single.

2010 saw a human drummer being recruited and tracks recorded for the 'Cabinet of Curiosity' album tied in with the multi-artist Manchester based Music/Arts project of the same name. Following the departure of Sam, the group struggled on with temporary bassists for a time before finally splitting in the summer of 2011 due to "irreconcilable sexual differences".

== Reformation ==
Following singer Stephen's disillusionment at the poor quality of various live acts he was watching in 2013, he put out a call to his former bandmates to see if they wished to rehearse again. Both Thom and Rob answered in the positive and, with one of their temporary late-period bassists in tow, they began rehearsing again in June, and subsequently writing new material.

An 11 track compilation, "10 Greatest Hits" began doing the rounds of various Indiepop labels and radio stations in the Summer of 2013.

The first 'comeback' gig took place in October, supporting former labelmate's Ivan Hell's "Songs of Death" project. This was followed in 2014 by a recording session, resulting in the "Carry On Billy Ruffian" EP released in June 2015, shortly before the band played the 'Going Up The Country' festival. A live album of the gig saw release shortly afterwards.

2016 opened with recordings for a new single and preparations for another acoustic gig.

== Members ==
- Stephen Ruffian (lead vocals)
- Thom Cuell (guitar)
- Rob Goodison (drums)
- Andy Brownridge (bass guitar)

== Discography ==
=== Albums ===
- My Secret Life (Angel 013) 28 May 2007
- 10 Greatest Hits (self released) July 2013

=== Singles and EPs ===
- "Late Arrivals" EP (self released split EP with Midland Railway) February 2006
- "Death of a Band" EP (self released) April 2006
- "Death of a Band" single (self released) June 2006
- "Music vs. Money" split single with The Art Goblins (FLA Records - Filthy 010) 14 May 2007
- "The Most Unlikely Civil Liberties Defender of All!" (Self released YouTube Video) 23 June 2008
- "Masterminding My Downfall" (FLA Records - Little 033) 20 October 2008
- "The Cat That Became Prime Minister" (Self released YouTube Video) 25 October 2009
- "All I Want For Christmas Is A Ting Ting" (Split single with Stick Boy) (Soviet Union Records) 24 December 2009
- "Stereo" (Pavement cover) (YouTube Video with FLA Records) 1 March 2010
- "Latent Patriot" (YouTube) June 2014
- "Carry On Billy Ruffian" EP (Bandcamp) 2 June 2015

=== Appearances on compilation EPs ===
- "Spring Sampler EP" also featuring Dirtblonde, Colt.45s, Leatherettes (FLA Records - Little 009); 14 May 2007
- "Brave New World Sampler CD" (FLA Records - FLAB002) included "'Hip To Be Square"; 16 April 2008
- "Brave New World Sampler CD" (FLA Records - FLAB003) included "My Girlfriend Is Like A Trojan Horse (Demo)"; 16 May 2008
- "Brave New World Sampler CD" (FLA Records - FLAB004) included "Hot Patootie (Bless My Soul)"; 16 June 2008
- Just A Minute 7" (Filthy Little Angels - Filthy 015) included "The Windsor Uplift"; 27 October 2008

=== Appearances on compilation albums ===
- Manchester University Indie Society Compilation; September 2006 (more detail needed)
- Hark! The Filthy Angels Sing (Filthy Little Angels - Little 007) included "Death of a Band"; December 2006
- NineteenEightySeven (Filthy Little Angels - Little 015) included "Hip to be Square"; 16 July 2007
- Manchester: City of Filth (Filthy Little Angels - Little 018) included "Leaving Soon"; 22 September 2007
- The Filthy Horror Show (Filthy Little Angels - Little 019) included "Hot Patootie (Bless my Soul)"; 31 October 2007
- A Very Cherry Christmas vol. 3 (Cherryade Records - CHY014) included "It's a Long, Lonely Christmas without Jimmy Greenhoff"; 3 December 2007
- Tis the Season To Be Filthy (Filthy Little Angels - Little 020) included "Feliz Navidad"; 17 December 2007
- Nineteen78 (Filthy Little Angels - Little 039) included "Public Image"; Autumn? 2008
- It'll Be Filthy This Christmas (Filthy Little Angels - Little 040) included "All I Want For Christmas Is A Ting Ting" and "It's a Long, Lonely Christmas without Jimmy Greenhoff"; December 2008
- Five Years Of Filth: Music vs Money (Filthy Little Angels - Little 055) included "Music vs Money"; 14 December 2009
- Oh Come, All Ye Filthy (Filthy Little Angels - Little 056) included "Feliz Navidad"; 21 December 2009
- Show Me A Word That Rhymes With 'Pavement' (Filthy Little Angels) included "Stereo"; 1 March 2010
