= Spookey (UK band) =

Spookey were a Manchester soul band of the 1970s who recorded for Decca Records.[

== Discography ==
- A: "Mama's Little Girl" / B: "Magic"; producer Choonika, arranged Marvin Marshall 1978
- A: "Someone Oughta' Write A Song About You Baby" / B: "Times" 1979
- A: "Who's Taken The Lid Off This Affair?" / B: "In Your Heart" 1979
- A: "On The Rocks" / B: "Friends" Satril Records 1981
