= Byron Hare =

English pop rock band

Byron Hare are a five-piece pop rock band from Birmingham, England. The band formed in late 2013 as a three-piece, playing mostly art shows around Birmingham, before their debut live performance as a six-piece band on 9 May 2014.

From July 2014 to August 2015, the band consisted of Jodie Ollis, Greg Clarke, Glen Bibbs, Jay Dyer, Dan Knight and Kyle Halford, before becoming a five-piece with the departure of Dyer.

Byron Hare dissolved in October 2015, with four of the members forming the band "Shrinking Violets". Shrinking Violets broke up in June 2016, while the three founding members of Byron Hare relaunched the group, with the addition of Rob Smith on bass guitar and Jacob Hall on drums.

They played their BBC premiere on 31 July 2017.

== Discography ==
- Sleep On The Fire EP - 31/10/15
- Byron Hare 1968 - 31/10/15
- Serendipity (online)
- Veealune (online)
- Bonds (online)
- To See Myself In Colour (online)
- House Of Clowns (online)
