= The Joker & The Thief =

Band from London

The Joker & The Thief are a band from London signed to Mess Around Productions. They are strongly associated with Strummerville, The Joe Strummer Foundation for New Music, and feature on Island/Communion's "Flowerpot Collaborations" album. The trio is composed of Dan Grabiner (vocals, percussion), Josh Elliott (saxophone, accordion, saw, ukulele) and Justin Gartry (guitar, kick-drum) and their sound has been compared to various genres including soul, blues, psychedelia, rock 'n' roll, folk and rhythm & blues. The Evening Standard has described the band as "the real stars of 2011" and Clash Magazine call them a "rip-roaring trio"
