= Isaac's Aircraft =

- Origin: Cambridge, England
- Genres: Indie rock
- Years active: 2008-2012
- Labels: Crash Records
- Website: www.isaacsaircraft.com

Isaac's Aircraft are an English indie rock band from Cambridge, England. The band consists of Zak (vocals, rhythm guitar, synth), Martin (keyboards, synth), Calum (lead guitar) and Adam (drums). The band have won a major music industry award, the indie/rock award at The People's Music Awards in 2011. Their win received coverage on the BBC News Website. and a 2010 encounter with singer Amy Winehouse received coverage in the Daily Mirror. To date they have released one EP, three singles and a live acoustic album Two is a Crowd.

== History ==
Isaac's Aircraft formed whilst Zak, Martin, and their friend James Lane were studying at Sixth Form college in Cambridge. Once the band had finished Sixth Form college they continued to play together during university holidays. With this line-up they recorded and self-released their debut EP Holding Up The Line. Shortly afterward guitarist Calum joined the group, expanding their predominantly piano-led sound. As a consequence tracks from Holding Up the Line are rarely played. During this period they acquired a staunch following amongst their contemporaries in Cambridge as a result of extensive live performances.

In 2009 Isaac's Aircraft were signed on a development deal to independent label Crash Records, through whom they released their first single Friends and Foes on 6 April 2009. To promote the release the band filmed a video, and were introduced by Tom Robinson on BBC Radio 6 Music.

In January 2010 Isaac's Aircraft were featured on NME's "Best of Myspace" show. New single Head to the Feet was also released on 22 February.

Over the summer of 2010 the band recorded "Two is a Crowd," a live acoustic version of the band's current set. Produced by Phil Watts and mastered in the United States by Adrian Carr, "Two is a Crowd" was released by Crash records on 4 July 2011 as a prelude to the band's as yet untitled first electric album due for release in 2013. Laurence Green described the album as "refreshing to sample something of such clarity once in a while, and in terms of clarity, Two Is A Crowd is about as pure as you can get," whilst Brandon Veevers suggested that "Over the duration of just over half an hour we are offered a collection of well written nuggets of indie pop that serve well for the bands welcoming into the UK's mainstream market." A first single from the electric album, produced by Gavin Monaghan was released on 26 September 2011 and featured on Q radio and a number of other digital radio stations.

In June 2011, the band won the indie/rock award at The People's Music Awards, a public vote and music industry international award for new and emerging artists. They followed this win with a second award - winning the London Kopparberg battle of the bands competition in July 2011. Following these award-winning performances Ant Henderson left with Adam Winch-Furness joining the band in October 2011. In October 2012, the band won the best indie act at the Exposure Music Awards 2012, and were the runners up across all acts in the whole competition.

== Discography ==
=== EPs and singles ===
- Mathematics (Crash Records, 2011)
- Head to the Feet (Crash Records, 2010)
- Friends and Foes (Crash Records, 2009)
- Holding Up the Line EP (2008, self-released)

=== Live albums ===
- Two is a Crowd (Crash Records, 2011)

== Members ==
- Martin Seidel - keyboard
- Zak Thomas - lead vocals, rhythm guitar
- Calum Fall - lead guitar
- Adam Winch-Furness- drums

== Former members ==
- James Lane - drums, percussion
- Ant Henderson - drums
