= Dressmaker (band) =

London-based noise rock and

dressmaker
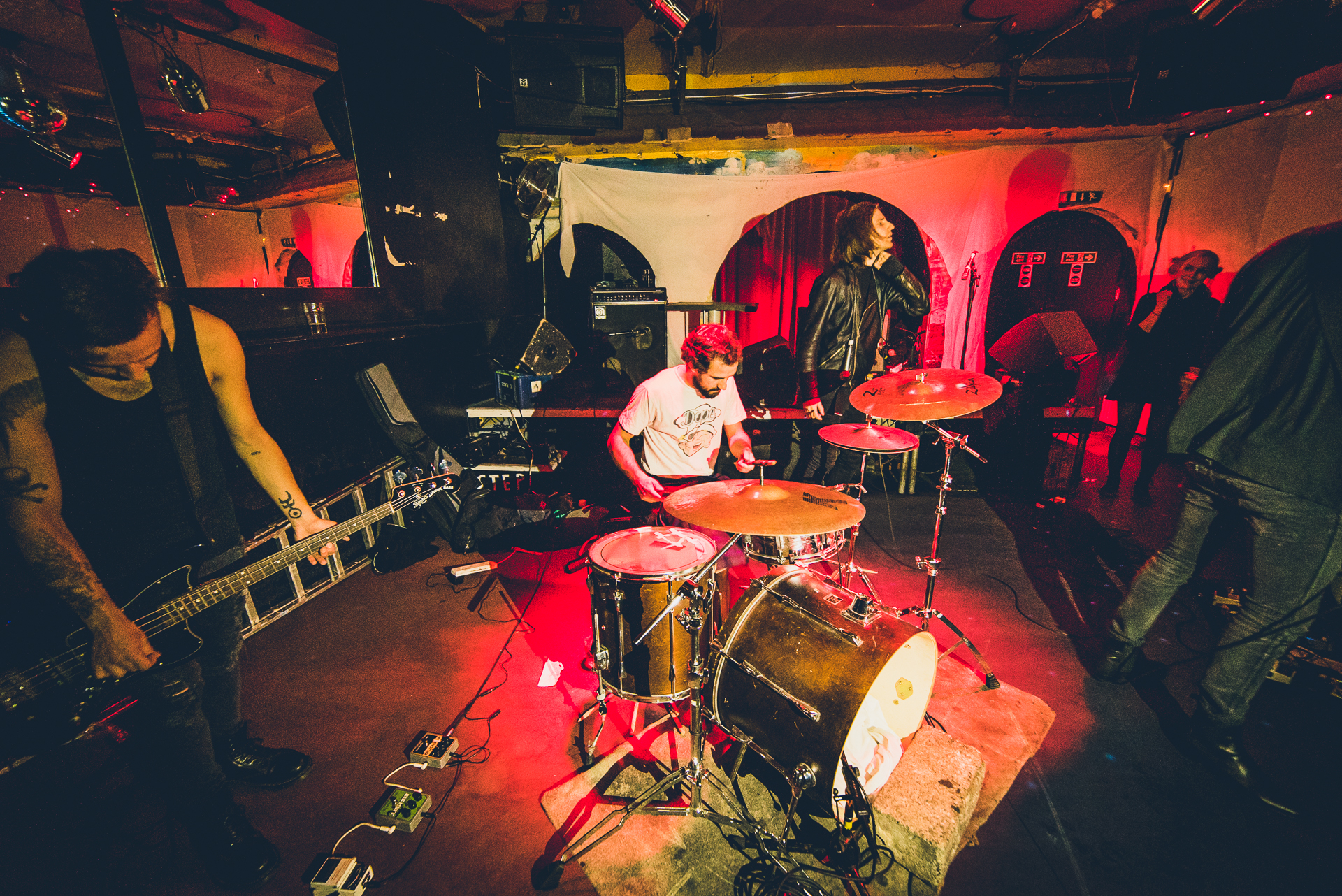

Background information
- Origin: Hackney, London, United Kingdom
- Genres: Noise rock, post-punk revival, shoegaze, experimental rock, psychedelic rock
- Years active: 2013–2017
- Members: Charles Potashner; David López; Tom Fanthorpe; BenJack
- Website: www.dressmakernoise.com

dressmaker were an East London–based noise rock band composed of Charles Potashner (vocals), David López (guitar), Tom Fanthorpe (bass guitar) and BenJack (drums). The band played an aggressive yet atmospheric wall of sound-influenced blend of post-punk, psychedelic rock, and shoegaze. They released their first single, "Skeleton Girl" in 2013 — NME said "their raging seven-minute Skeleton Girl is etched against a backdrop of fuzz that scratches so deep it would make the Jesus & Mary Chain whimper". Despite their first single being seven minutes long the band has received regular radio play on the radio station XFM.

== History ==
=== Formation ===
dressmaker was formed in 2013 in the London borough of Hackney. Guitarist David López and former drummer Jose Quiñones relocated to London from Catalonia where they encountered British bass guitarist Tom and Charles Potashner, an American. During an interview on Haggerston Radio the band stated that while auditioning Potashner they offered to play him songs they had written but he said that he did not need to hear them. Instead, he dove into writing melodies and lyrics immediately. At first they thought he was arrogant but they later decided he was just strange. In 2014, Quiñones was replaced by French a drummer who has been referred to as BenJack.

During their first year, the band performed frequently in London at venues such as Shacklewell Arms, The Lexington and Barfly.. They developed a reputation for "being one of the loudest, noisiest and most intense live bands around."

=== Instruments ===
Guitarist David López played a Fender Jaguar through a 1970s Fender Twin Reverb.

=== Glass EP ===
It was announced in early January 2014, via the band's official Facebook and Twitter, that they were working on a new EP entitled Glass to be released on 23 June 2014, digitally and in mid-July on vinyl. The EP was recorded and mixed by frontman Charles Potashner who gained experience by studying music engineering at Alchemea College in Islington. According to Italian Vice "the only cash spent on recording Glass was taxi fare for moving amps around London and £15 for some K Cider to make a music video for 'The Future.'" The Future has been described as "punkish psych grind."

=== "Love Me" ===
On 12 March 2015, dressmaker released "Love Me" as a single with two B-side tracks. The single debuted prior to its release date in the form of a music video. The video was directed by Daniel Gottschling and stars actors Amy Shelley and David Hepburn alongside the band. The b-side tracks include a cover of the Phil Spector's Ronettes classic "Be My Baby" featuring vocals from Nathalia Bruno of the dream pop trio Leave The Planet; and an original composition entitled "Love Will Tear Us Apart", which lyrically references the Joy Division track of the same name, and is more aligned with grindcore rather than Dressmaker's usual post-punk sound.

== Discography ==
=== Singles ===
- 2013: "Skeleton Girl"
- 2014; "The Future"
- 2015: "Love Me"

=== EPs ===
- 2014: Glass EP
