= A Genuine Freakshow =

English baroque pop band

- Origin: Reading, Berkshire, England
- Genres: Art rock, baroque pop, post-rock
- Years active: 2005–2013
- Label: Peartree Records
- Members: Timothy Sutcliffe; Jack Bryant; Marianne Casey Canning; Melanie Dickson; John Dunstan; Simon Evans; John Szmidt
- Website: agenuinefreakshow.com Facebook

A Genuine Freakshow (sometimes shortened to "AGF") were a baroque pop band originating from Reading, Berkshire, England. They were formed in 2005, settling on their current 7-piece permanent line-up in 2008. After several EP and single releases from 2007 to 2009 the band released their full-length debut album Oftentimes in November 2010 on their Peartree Records label.

== History ==
The origins of A Genuine Freakshow can be traced back to September 2003. At this time both Simon Evans and Tim Sutcliffe (formerly of Bob Marley and the Wailers), later to perform to an assemblage of professional traffic management staff an impromptu but highly competent and influential version of Tom McRae's 'The Boy with the Bubble Gun', were studying at the Buckinghamshire New University. Their first show was at The Roundhouse pub in High Wycombe during an unplugged night. In late 2004 Natalie Sharp joined on violin, bringing along her friend Melanie Dickson (cello), after Evans and Sutcliffe had seen her card in a music store. Late in 2005, "EP" was recorded live in one night in Beaconsfield with new bassist Matthew Taylor (now of Dry the River) and drummer Dominic Bell. Sutcliffe initially struggled with the inevitable associations with the eponymous Yorkshire Ripper but overcame these dire associations with his musical accomplishments. Not to be disregarded throughout this critical time are the influence of mentors and protectors of the faith Will Dunhill and Ed Powers, without whose invaluable advice and guidance the young Evans and Sutcliffe combo might never have found their musical 'wal', to quote Raymond E. Feist in his influential fantasy novel Magician.

2006 saw a change in musical direction for AGF: moving away from the acoustic/folk act they were, they embraced a more Post-Rock sound; they also had a drastic shift in personnel. Natalie left, Dominic was replaced with Jon Burgess on drums, whilst Evans and Sutcliffe relocated from High Wycombe to Reading. By the beginning of 2007 the EP "0.008%" was recorded with the help of Mike Siddell (Hope of the States, The Leisure Society, Lightspeed Champion) on violin and trumpet player John Dunstan of Cats and Cats and Cats, whom the band had met supporting them on tour. After continued involvement with AGF's live performances, Dunstan formally joined the band in 2008. John Szmidt also arrived, and replaced Matt Taylor on bass at the start of 2008.

The group's first single "We are the Undercurrents" was released in March 2008, with second single "Holding Hearts" following in July. Both of these singles featured new and current bassist John Szmidt, and a guest appearance by Will Harvey (also now of Dry the River) on violin, as no permanent replacement for Natalie had been found. By October 2008, Marianne Casey Canning was recruited to fill the role, and Jack Bryant arrived late in preparation for an impending tour to become the band's full-time drummer.

Throughout 2009 the band continued to tour and began recording new material; the debut album Oftentimes was finished in April 2010, and was released in November 2010. The band played at several major UK festivals in the summer preceding the release of Oftentimes, including Bestival, Summer Sundae and 2000trees.

Before the release of debut album Oftentimes, the band hired bassist/drummer Jack Fynes (formerly of failed '90s pop duo For Her Eyes Only). Jack felt the band needed an extra dimension to its image and took on heavy influences from Kiss megastar Gene Simmons, and Marilyn Manson. Unfortunately in July 2010, Jack proved to be too much of a handful and was subsequently booted from the group. His excessive partying and womanising didn't go down well with band big-man Tim 'Stoop Kid' Sutcliffe. Some believe Jack's short but influential time with A Genuine Freakshow was the inspiration behind the single I Can Feel His Heartbeats.

The second single from Oftentimes, 'Hopscotch Machine Gun Madness', was released on 14 March 2011 via Peartree Records/PIAS. The b-side is a remix of 'Our Bodies' by Bright Light Bright Light, with 'Luckmore Drive (Live)' available exclusively from iTunes.

In July 2011, A Genuine Freakshow were chosen by BBC Introducing to play the BBC Introducing Stage at Reading and Leeds festivals.

== Musical style ==
The focal point of the band's musical style has been a self described "pop-infused post-rock cannonade", using the rich sounds of the cello, trumpet and violin, as well as more traditional rock instruments. On top of this, Timothy Sutcliffe's falsetto vocals are interwoven with orchestral arrangements, the like of which are more commonly seen in post-rock acts such as Godspeed You! Black Emperor. In later releases, however – in particular the debut album Oftentimes – the band's sound has become more pop orientated. Mark Ellen of The Word describes the band as "A Bombastic Nu-Metal power house, writing a compelling tome on Jean Paul Sartre...with a String section, and trenchant sheets of Pink Floyd and Sigur Rós fed through the Radiohead filter"

The band cites the following as artists they are inspired by: The National, Elbow, Radiohead, Mew, Sigur Rós, Bob Dylan, Tom Waits, Pink Floyd and The Beatles.

== Debut Album: Oftentimes (2010) ==
A Genuine Freakshow's debut studio album Oftentimes was produced by Jordan Fish (Worship, Bring Me the Horizon), Michael Hunter (Marillion, Mew, Echo & The Bunnymen, Mansun, The Coral, Alfie) as well as the band themselves, recorded in producer Jordan Fish's Studio 91, and mixed at The Racket Club. The album was released on 8 November 2010 on Peartree Records in a variety of formats: a standard CD edition, MP3 edition, and a Deluxe CD package that features the bonus album Pastimes.

=== Oftentimes ===
- "We Are The Undercurrents"
- "I Can Feel His Heartbeats"
- "Hopscotch Machine Gun Madness"
- "New Houses"
- "She's Got A Shooter" (Part 1)
- "You Cut Me Out"
- "Our Bodies"
- "Holding Hearts"
- "Warning Shot"

Four of the tracks on Oftentimes are re-recordings of tracks previously featured on the band's various EPs. Oftentimes was made available for pre-order on 16 August 2010 exclusively from the band's official website, and "I Can Feel His Heartbeats" and "Hopscotch Machine Gun Madness" are to be released as singles.

==== Pastimes ====
Pastimes is a bonus album that was given away exclusively to customers that pre-ordered the Oftentimes deluxe edition. The CD features a mixture of past singles, former EP tracks, radio edits and several remixes. Pastimes essentially acts as a condensed history, allowing new listeners to hear songs from EPs that are now long out of print. The original recordings of the four tracks that were previously released as singles and on EPs are also featured on Pastimes, enabling the listener to hear how the songs have evolved.

== Discography ==
=== Albums ===
- Pastimes (Peartree Records – October 2010)
- Oftentimes (Peartree Records – November 2010)

=== EPs ===
- EP (Peartree Records – March 2006)
- 0.008% (Bluehand Music – April 2007)

=== Singles ===
- "We are the Undercurrents" (Dead Pilot Records – March 2008)
- "Holding Hearts" (Peartree Records – July 2008)
- "I Can Feel His Heartbeats" (Peartree Records – October 2010)
- "Hopscotch Machine Gun Madness" (Peartree Records – March 2011)
- "Our Bodies" (Peartree Records – October 2011)

== Personnel ==
=== Current members ===
- Jack Bryant – Drums, Backing Vocals
- Marianne Casey Canning – Violin
- Melanie Dickson – Cello
- John Dunstan – Trumpet, Glockenspiel, Additional Percussion
- Simon Evans – Guitar, Piano, Glockenspiel, Backing Vocals
- Timothy Sutcliffe – Vocals, Guitar, Piano, Backing Vocals
- John Szmidt – Bass Guitar

=== Former members ===
- Matthew Taylor – Bass
- Dominic Bell – Drums
- Jon Burgess – Drums
- Dan Peters – Bass
- Natalie Sharp – Violin
- Will Harvey – Violin (Guest Appearances)
- Mike Siddell – Violin (Guest Appearances)
- Hatty Taylor – Vocals (Guest Appearance)
- Jack Fynes - Bass/Drums
