= Sizer Barker =

English band

Sizer Barker was an indie band from Liverpool, England.

== Members ==
As of 2004, the band comprised frontman Carl Brown, multi-instrumentalist Tim Bruzon, and bassist Maria Hughes.

== History ==
Sizer Barker began as the solo project of Carl Brown, who had previously played with The Lightning Seeds and Space, in 2000. Their name is derived from a gravestone inscription reading "William Sizer Barker", seen by Brown in a Liverpool cemetery. The band were signed to Peter Gabriel's record label Pre.

Dave Simpson of The Guardian described Sizer Barker's sound as "a wonderful, idiosyncratic thing", and likened the band to Beck, Shack and Pere Ubu. Ben Hogwood of MusicOMH described their music as "life-affirming" and their debut album as "a record that could only have been made in Liverpool." Andy Gill of The Independent described the album as "a sparkling, diverse collection, full of Beatlesque melodies and quirky, exotic arrangements". Stewart Lee of The Times wrote of the album: "It's easy on the ear, but contains enough subliminal segments of squally guitar noise to appease those suspicious of nakedly commercial craftsmanship."

The group performed a live set for Janice Long's show on BBC Radio 2 on 13 January 2005.

== Discography ==
- "Day by Day" – single, Hug Records
- "Something in the Park" – single, Hug Records
- Songs from the Parlour – EP, Pre Records
- Hotel Juicy Parlour – album, Pre Records
- "Climb Aboard" – single, Pre Records
- "Day by Day" – single, Pre Records
- "Transmission Land" – single, Pre Records
