= P.C.T =

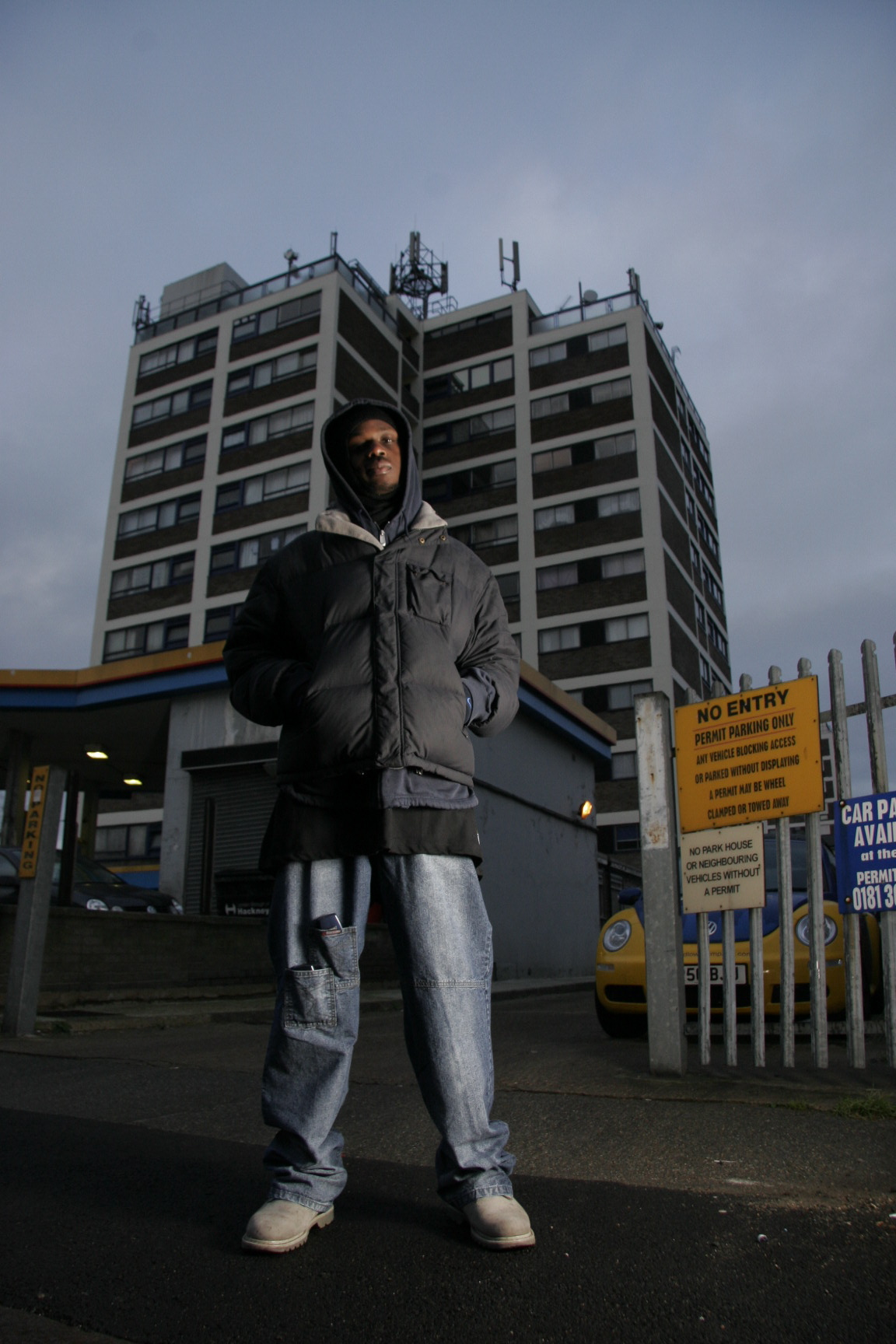
- P.C.T in 2010

Background information
- Genres: Hip-Hop, Rap, Electronic
- Years active: 2001–Present
- Label: P.C.T
- Website: musicglue.com/pct

P.C.T is a London-based independent recording artist/producer who produces Hip-Hop/Rap music (with Electronic influences). "P" has released singles, freestyles, an EP and performed around Greater London.

== History ==
=== Early life ===
Growing up in London, UK, P.C.T first did music as a hobby at school through recorder and guitar lessons (before writing his own songs). After getting more into football, 'P' got back into music before it grew into a genuine passion.

=== Formation ===
After noticing a lack of originality in the industry, P began to produce and perform new songs. After building his music industry knowledge through part-time work as a roadie/A&R for a popular DJ, P continued to improve as a producer before studying music/film/business, after which he established his own independent record label.

=== DMR Era ===
P's first "freestyle"/unofficial promotional single, "You Know What To Do", was played by DJs on numerous underground radio stations during Winter 2004. His second unofficial promo single, "D.M.B.G.S" (a collaboration with local producer Poppa Sprinkle), was played by various DJs on both underground and commercial radio stations (including DJ 279 and Phoebe One on Choice FM, Dan Greenpeace on XFM and others). The track was also played at nightclubs in Leicester Square / London during Summer 2005.

P's third promo single, "Block To The Bar", a collaboration with local producers Dnyce and Strategy, was played by DJs on various underground stations from Spring 2006 onwards.

P's fourth promo single, "Life Is A Gift" (a collaboration with Liverpool-based artists Defiance, Young Kof and Pyro), was played on stations such as BBC Radio 1Xtra and numerous underground ones after its release as a free download in Summer 2006.

P's first official single, "Here We Go (Finally)", was released in Spring 2007 and its promotional music video aired on Sky TV channels such as Channel U and BEN Television.

P's second single, "Keep It Gully (V.2)", released in Spring 2008, was played on commercial stations by DJs such as Huw Stephens on BBC Radio 1 (it was also played by other DJs on various underground ones).

P's third single, the Summer 2008 release "Shooting Star", was played on stations such as BBC Radio 1Xtra and various underground ones.

P's fourth single, "Drift Away", was given a limited release from Summer 2010 (a month after The Digital Lyrical Miracle EP that it appeared on) until 14 October 2015 (because of an ongoing legal action to have it removed from sale by German digital distributor 'Dance All Day GmbH', who breached its contract with DMR)...

P's fifth single, "Bubbles Go Bang", released in Winter 2011, was broadcast on commercial stations such as Kiss and its video aired on TV channels such as The Box UK and Virgin TV.

P's sixth single, "My Desire", released in Spring 2012, was aired on commercial stations such as Kiss and its video also aired on channels such as Kiss TV.

P has appeared in publications such as RWD (2010), Touch Magazine (2007), What's Poppin' (2006), Invincible Magazine (2006) and StreetCred Magazine. However, having been on a hiatus from music production since 2012, he is currently working on an EP and tour set for release/commencement in 2021.

== Musical style ==
P's music has an eclectic taste-inspired futuristic-yet-relateable sound, via its electronic elements and the experimental, humour-tinged lyrical style that underpins it.

== Discography ==
=== EPs ===
Release Date	Title	UK Album Chart Position	Billboard 200 Position
21 Jun 2010	The Digital Lyrical Miracle EP	–	N/A
Winter 2021	[EP]	–	N/A

=== Singles ===
Release Date	Title	UK Singles Chart Position	Billboard Hot 100 Position	Album / EP
7 May 2007	"Here We Go (Finally)"	–	–	N/A
14 Jan 2008	"Keep It Gully (v.2)"	–	–	N/A
9 Jun 2008	"Shooting Star"	–	–	N/A
12 Jul 2010	"Drift Away"	–	–	The Digital Lyrical Miracle EP
21 Nov 2011	"Bubbles Go Bang"	–	–	N/A
2 Feb 2012	"My Desire"	–	–	N/A
Winter 2021	[Single]	–	–	[EP, Winter 2021]

=== Covers/Freestyles ===
- "You Know What To Do", backing music originally "Drop It Like It's Hot" by Snoop Dogg featuring Pharrell.
