= Public Relations Exercise =

British post-hardcore/rock group

- Origin: Leicester, England
- Genres: Post-hardcore; Alternative rock Math rock
- Years active: 2003–2008
- Labels: Field Records
- Members: Lloyd Carter; Martin Smith; Danny Star; Tiernan Welch; Spencer Lee

Public Relations Exercise were a Leicester, England based post-hardcore/alternative rock group. A five-piece combining aspects of math rock, layered with penetrative and socially observant lyrics.

== History ==
The band began as a product of the development of bedroom songwriters Martin Smith and Lloyd Carter. From an early age, they worked on various projects with local drummer Danny Star, and with the later addition of Irish-born bassist, Tiernan Welch, and guitarist, Spencer Lee, their line-up was finalised in September 2005. The name is taken from the inlay of Radiohead's second album, The Bends.

In their short history; Public Relations Exercise played with acts including Youthmovies, 65daysofstatic, Foals and many others. After demoing material for some time, the band recorded their debut single 'Subteniente', at Far Heath Studios with producer Angus Wallace (The Fall, The Prodigy) in 2007, which was released as a through Nottingham based Field Records in conjunction an extensive UK tour with ex-Million Dead frontman Frank Turner and London Hardcore outfit Score One For Safety.

Public Relations Exercise earned limited notoriety but gained reviews in national press such as Rock Sound. Their first long player album, Come you are safe, we are from the bombs, was released on 2 April 2007 via Field Records to positive reviews.

P.R.E's second single was released on 22 October 2007. The single, which included two unreleased b-sides, were recorded at their rehearsal space located in Merrylees Industrial Estate, situated in the West of Leicestershire, on 8 & 9 August. To promote the single the band completed a tour with Northern Irish Post rock outfit And So I Watch You From Afar.

Popular zine Drowned in Sound launched a competition for a reader to produce the artwork for the single. The final artwork chosen was designed by Ed P and was announced by the webzine on 15 August.

The single was received decent reviews from the usual on-line webzines and a "celebrity review" from members of Finnish Viking metal idiots Turisas in the October issue of Rock Sound.

2008 saw the band splitting amicably.

Members of the band Martin Smith, Tiernan Welch, Lloyd Carter and Danny Star briefly played together in Bronze Age who recorded with Field Records' Tim Waterfield and played a handful of shows in 2009. As of 2014 Tiernan Welch plays bass with Her Name Is Calla.

== Line up ==
- Martin Smith – Vocals
- Danny Star – Drums
- Lloyd Carter – Guitars
- Spencer Baggots – Guitars
- Tiernan Welch – Bass

== Discography ==
=== Albums ===
- Come you are safe, we are from the bombs – Field Records 2 April 2007

=== Singles ===
- Subteniente 7" Split w/Lafaro – Field Records 2006
- Catalyst – Field Records 22 October 2007

=== Demos ===
- Death pop [EP] 2003
- What you need to hear 2004
- Correct, Avoid 2005

=== Compilations ===
- Catalyst – Public Service Broadcast # 8 – Smalltown America

== See also ==
- List of bands from England
- List of post-rock bands
- List of math rock bands
