= Yeah Yeah Noh =

UK musical group

- Yeah Yeah Noh, 2026 - Andy, Fi, Ant, Siân and Derek

Background information
- Origin: Leicester, England
- Genres: Post-punk, psychedelic rock
- Years active: 1983–1986, 2011–present
- Labels: In-Tape, Vuggum, Strange Fruit, Cherry Red, Precious Recordings of London
- Members: Derek Hammond; Antony Cook; Fi Hodgson; Siân Howarth; Andy Lloyd
- Past members: John Grayland; Alan Jenkins; Graham Summers; Adrian Crossan; Sue Dorey; Tom Slater; Dermot O'Sullivan; Eva Landsberg
- Website: facebook.com/yeahyeahnoh1 yeahyeahnoh.bandcamp.com

Yeah Yeah Noh are an "unpop" group formed in Leicester, England in 1983. Originally a product of the DIY post-punk era, their sound was labelled 'Calor-gas psychedelia' by Mojo magazine in 2012. They released two albums and five singles while still together in the 1980s, and have had two compilation albums issued since they initially split up in 1986.

The group reformed in 2011, an announcement appearing on the Cherry Red Records website: "STOP PRESS: Yeah Yeah Noh are back together and are playing live as of summer 2012, on the lookout for 'interesting gigs in fields; gardens with expansive lawns considered'."

== Biography ==
Yeah Yeah Noh was formed by Derek Hammond (vocals, guitar) and John Grayland (guitar); Adrian Crossan (bass) joined them for the first single along with Graham Summers (drums). Sue Dorey (drums, vocals) was then recruited to complete the line-up, debuting on the second single. Two of the band members, John Grayland and Sue Dorey (along with Damian Swarbrick), published Printhead, a free magazine focusing on independent music in Leicester and its environs. The magazine released Let's Cut a Rug, a compilation LP of songs from local independent bands which included the track "Bias Binding" - which DJ John Peel adopted and began to play on an almost nightly basis.

Signing to Marc Riley and Jim Khambatta's In-Tape Records, the band debuted in June 1984 with the Cottage Industry EP, a post-punk guitar rumble with humorous, downbeat lyrics. EP track "Bias Binding" ended the year voted number 32 in Peel's annual Festive Fifty. Yeah Yeah Noh played the opening night of his London ICA Rock Week festival, a line from "Bias Binding" providing its publicity strapline: "John Peel Is Putting the Fun Back into Being Pretentious". After a further two EPs, the releases so far were collected on the album When I Am A Big Girl.

John Grayland, Derek Hammond, local lad, Sue Dorey, Adrian Crossan - Leicester '84

The band had quickly developed "a more droning, proto-psychedelic noise", combined with darker lyrical "dreamscapes" and "distorted-state realities". As the NME reported, "Another Side to Mrs Quill" "skips along with a beat that is contemptuously monotonous. Butterflies. Naked women. It's what escapism is all about... Derek Hammond is easily the best contemporary lyricist in Britain today."

After adding Tom Slater on guitar, they shifted further towards a "progressed sound (that) included new instruments, sampling, phasing and distortion – a more relevant and contemporary form of psychedelia" that incorporated punk's DIY ethic. Their first album proper, 1985's Cutting The Heavenly Lawn Of Greatness... Last Rites For The God Of Love was described by Sounds as "a strange and somehow deeply moving LP". The band released a further single but split up in 1986. Hammond announced that he was forming two new groups, The New New Seekers and The Time Beings, but neither materialized, and he continued to work as a music journalist under the pseudonym D.J. Fontana.

The band's three Peel sessions were collected on the Fun On The Lawn Lawn Lawn album in 1986, and a retrospective Leicester Square was issued by Cherry Red Records in 2001, including several tracks recorded after the band had supposedly split.

Hammond later wrote the mythological travelogue London, England (Mainstream Publishing 1998) and Got Not Got: The A-Z of Lost Football Culture, Treasures & Pleasures (Pitch Publishing, 2011), also compiling the BBC Radio 1 John Peel Show retrospective Perfect Unpop: Peel Show Hits and Long-Lost Lo-Fi Favourites (Vol. 1, 1976–80) (Cherry Red Records 2008).

The group reformed in 2012 including John, Derek and Tom from the 1980s line-up, Dermot O'Sullivan (bass) who had played guitar on those promised later 1980s sessions, Antony Cook (drums) and Eva Landsberg (keyboards). For the John Peel Archive's celebration of the DJ's record collection, Yeah Yeah Noh were chosen to represent the letter 'Y' and appeared in a video: 'Y Is For Yeah Yeah Noh'. In October 2013, Eva stepped down and virtuoso bassist Fi Hodgson joined - on keyboards.

A new awareness of Yeah Yeah Noh arose as Cherry Red Records included tracks - "Temple of Convenience", "Another Side to Mrs Quill", "Bias Binding", "Prick Up Your Ears" and "The Short-Cut Way to Saturday" - on a series of five CD box sets dedicated to indie music, released over a span of 11 years. They appeared at the weekend live festivals that launched both the initial Scared to Get Happy - A Story of Indie Pop 1980-1989 (2013) and C-86 - The Deluxe Edition (2014).

In 2014 they gained a second vocalist in Siân Howarth and began recording the album Automatically Saturday at Crooks Hall Studio in Suffolk and Vale Studios, Pershore. Its 2015 release was preceded by the digital single "She Pulls the Petal From the Flower" and followed by "Let's Start a War" and "In a Loop in Time". Other key tracks included "Up On the Downs" and "On the Queen's Highway". The band also re-recorded "Another Side to Mrs. Quill", listed by Mojo magazine in 2006 as one of the "50 Greatest British Tracks Ever".

After 13 years of sporadic live appearances (and having recorded two further BBC Radio sessions for Marc Riley in 2012 and 2019) Grayland, Slater and O'Sullivan all took their final bow in March 2025, playing with The Loft at Birmingham's Castle & Falcon. As former loaded magazine editor James Brown later sympathised, “To lose one band member is unfortunate; to lose three in one day looks very careless.”

In response came an unprecedented burst of activity which saw Fi Hodgson switch to bass and the addition of Andy Lloyd - one-time Nightingale and Nick Drake Gathering regular - on guitar. One review of the new line-up’s October 2025 debut at Preston Popfest was as short as it was sweet: “Amazing.”

Newly signed to Precious Recordings of London, the 10-inch vinyl Big Thumb EP appeared on presale in October 2026 with a December release date. Recorded at Load Street Studios, Kidderminster, tracks include "Big Thumb", "A Room Without a View", "I Identify As You" and "CGI Friday".

== Discography ==
(chart placings shown are from the UK Independent Chart)

=== Singles ===
- "Cottage Industry" (1984, In-Tape, IT008) No. 23
- "Beware The Weakling Lines" (1984, In-Tape, IT010) No. 8
- "Prick Up Your Ears" (1985, In-Tape, IT012) #6 came with The Yeah Yeah Noh Bumper Annual book
- "(Another Side To) Mrs. Quill" (1985, In-Tape, IT020) No. 10
- "Temple of Convenience" (1985, In-Tape, IT023/ITT023) No. 12
- The Peel Sessions EP (1987, Strange Fruit, SFPS026)
- The Big Thumb EP (2026, Precious Recordings of London, PRENEW19)

=== Albums ===
- When I Am A Big Girl (1985, In-Tape, IT016) (mini-LP, compilation of first three ep's) No. 22
- Cutting The Heavenly Lawn of Greatness...Last Rites For The God Of Love (1985, In-Tape, IT021) No. 4
- Fun On The Lawn, Lawn, Lawn (1986, Vuggum, BAAD2) (compilation of John Peel sessions) No. 13
- Leicester Square: The Best of Yeah Yeah Noh (2001, Cherry Red, CDMRED183)
- Automatically Saturday (2015, Vuggum, BAAD 003)

== Current members ==
- Derek Hammond - vocals
- Andy Lloyd - guitar
- Fi Hodgson - bass guitar
- Antony Cook - drums
- Siân Howarth - vocals

== Former members ==
- John Grayland - lead guitar
- Alan Jenkins - bass guitar
- Graham Summers - drums
- Adrian Crossan - bass guitar
- Sue Dorey - drums
- Tom Slater - rhythm guitar
- Dermot O'Sullivan - bass guitar
- Eva Landsberg - keyboards
