= Music in Leicester =

Overview of music in the city of Leicester, UK

Leicester has produced a number of famous musical acts including Engelbert Humperdinck and Showaddywaddy.

== Venues ==
While Leicester has often been neglected as a centre for popular music, with the O2 Academy that has been built (opened 2010) in the city, more established acts have been booked to play.

Current venues for music include:

- De Montfort Hall, which has a standing capacity of 1602 and seating capacity of 2000
- The Big Difference, 68 High St, Leicester (opended 2020)
- The Musician, Crafton Street West, Leicester, (220 capacity) (opened 2000)
- The Donkey, 203 Welford Rd, Leicester (opened 2005)
- Firebug, 1 Millstone Lane, Leicester
- The Shed, Yeoman Street, Leicester.
- The SoundHouse, 28 Southampton St, Leicester LE1 1SJ

In March 2018, the Haymarket Theatre reopened pledging it will stage music events.

One of Leicester's main live music venues, The Charlotte, closed in January 2009. It briefly reopened in October 2009 before being closed permanently on 14 March 2010.

== 1960s ==
Leicester's main small venue for pop and rock was the Il Rondo on Silver Street. The roll call of bands who played at the Il Rondo runs like a who's Who of early–mid sixties pop and rock. The Yardbirds and The Animals played there before passing into rock history along with less well remembered groups like the Graham Bond Organisation. It also played host to many visiting American blues musicians including Howlin' Wolf, Freddie King, Lowell Fulson, Otis Spann and John Lee Hooker. The Beatles also came to De Montfort Hall.

Colin Hyde (East Midlands Oral History Archive) carried out a range of interviews about growing up in Leicester in the 1950s and 1960s and began to map where all of the venues of the day were. He identified a number of clubs, pubs, and coffee bars like the Chameleon, run by Pete Joseph, the El Casa, or the El Paso – cafes which stayed open after the pubs closed. Among others, people also remembered the Blue Beat club on Conduit Street, run by Alex Barrows who later started the House of Happiness on Campbell Street. Night clubs such as the Burlesque or the Nite Owl became more popular as the 1960s progressed, and they opened up the opportunity to dance all night.

Also emerging during this period was the notable band Family, fronted by Leicester man Roger Chapman which had some success nationally but mixed success internationally until they disbanded in 1973.

== 1980s ==
The early 1980s saw Leicester punk band Rabid have two minor indie hits, and there were greater successes later in the decade for Yeah Yeah Noh. Leicester funk band The Apollinaires signed to 2 Tone Records in 1982, and released three singles. Leicester new wave and synth-pop group The Swinging Laurels topped the independent charts with their 1981 single "Peace of Mind", followed by a John Peel session in 1982. The mid-1980s saw the emergence of bands such as Gaye Bykers on Acid, Crazyhead, The Bomb Party, and The Hunters Club, who were all associated with the Grebo scene. The Deep Freeze Mice had formed in 1979 and went on to release ten albums in total. Diesel Park West had their first top 75 hits in the late 1980s. Other notable Leicester bands from this decade included Po!, Blab Happy and Chrome Molly.

== 1990s ==
The band Prolapse, was formed by a group of Leicester University and Polytechnic students in 1992. The band rose in popularity, and quickly gained a record deal with Cherry Red Records, recorded a number of John Peel sessions for Radio 1, and toured with Sonic Youth, Stereolab and Pulp. 1992 also saw the formation in Leicester of Cornershop, an Anglo-Asian agit pop band, who became most famous for the 1998 Number 1 single "Brimful of Asha". Perfume and Delicatessen both also rose to critical acclaim. Leicester is home of the influential Rave – Drum & Bass Formation Records label and associated 5HQ Record Shop, which was reopened in 2012 as an active recording studio.

== 2000s ==
Since 2000 the city has once more seen a notable upsurge in the success of the local music scene. Several Leicester musicians and/or acts have received considerable media attention in their fields since 2003–2004. Kasabian, followed by Pacific Ocean Fire, The Displacements, Kyte, Maybeshewill and Neon Sarcastic have all risen from the city to national attention. The Go! Team were first signed to local label Pickled Egg Records, other Leicester musicians feature in notable national and questionably international bands such as; Fun Lovin' Criminals, Happy Mondays, The Holloways, Envy & Other Sins, and A Hawk and a Hacksaw.

Kasabian albums Empire and West Ryder Pauper Lunatic Asylum both achieved number one status in the UK Albums Chart in 2006 and 2009 respectively. Success followed in 2010 when the band won the Best British Group Award at the BRIT Awards 2010.

Other Leicester acts enjoying chart success in the Official UK Singles Chart during the 2000s include bassline act H "Two" O eventually reaching number two, and remaining there for three weeks, with their hit single "What's It Gonna Be". Dance music project Stunt eventually reached number nine with their collaborative hit single "Raindrops (Encore Une Fois)" (with Sash!). They have also gone on to collaborate with Europop sensation Basshunter.

2006 saw the closure of The Attik, a venue that for over twenty years had played host to hundreds of bands. The newly refurbished 'The Music Cafe', located on New Parks Street, was the venue for The Bandish Projekt and Stereophonics videos in 2011 and late 2012 respectively.

Leicester born writer and producer Nat Powers has also been active in the music industry, working with Run Dmc, the son of Dr. Dre amongst others.

== 2010s ==
The development of the award-winning music festival Summer Sundae with connecting Summer Sundae Fringe Festival (predominantly run by the local arts collective 'Pineapster') focused on blues and folk music may well provide the city with more of a focus for its local bands to break out nationally. Described by Steve Lamacq as 'the Grandson of Glastonbury and sponsored by BBC Radio 6 Music, the festival took place in the city's Victoria Park from 2011 until 2013 and featured headlining acts including Mumford & Sons, Public Image Ltd and McFly.

In 2013, organisers including local label Robot Needs Home established the 'Handmade' music festival which included acts such as Rolo Tomassi, Dutch Uncles and Tall Ships in its debut year.

Leicester grime artists such as Kamakaze and Jafro have gained some popularity within the scene during the mid-2010s. In 2015, Kamakaze released a freestyle on JDZ Media, which by 2019 has reached over 3 million views. In 2019, Kamakaze performed a football freestyle on the BBC, and featured on the FIFA 20 Volta soundtrack alongside Leicester producer Massappeals. Kamakaze's song "Kam Dog" also featured on the gameplay trailer for FIFA 20 Volta.

== 2020s ==
A flourishing scene for all female punk bands developed in the city around 2025.
