= T in the Park 2011 =

Music festival in Scotland

T in the Park
- Genre: Rock, alternative rock, indie rock, hard rock, punk rock, grime, trance, rap, techno, house, electronic, céilidh, jazz, acoustic music
- Dates: 8–10 July 2011
- Locations: Balado, Scotland, UK
- Years active: 1994 – present
- Website: http://tinthepark.com/

T in the Park 2011 was a three-day music festival which took place from 8–10 July 2011 in Balado, Scotland, The total crowd for this gig was 59,674. The eighteenth event to take place. The full line up was revealed in February 2011: Arctic Monkeys, Coldplay, Beyoncé and Foo Fighters were revealed as the headliners. Blink-182 were confirmed but cancelled as they were unable to produce their new album in time for their European tour. Christmas 'early bird' tickets were released on 3 December 2010, selling out in under 24 hours. A previous 'early bird' batch was released on 15 July.

== Tickets ==
Similar to previous years, early-bird tickets were released within days of the conclusion of the 2010 event, on 15 July 2010. Tickets remained on sale until the following Sunday. A further 'Christmas sale' took place from 3 December 2010, with tickets made available at 2010 festival ticket prices. It was confirmed on 3 December 2010 that early-bird tickets had sold out. The final batch of tickets went on sale on Friday 25 February 2011 and sold out in under an hour.

== Line-up ==
The line-up was billed to include 180 artists across eleven stages.

Friday 8 July	Saturday 9 July	Sunday 10 July
Main Stage
Arctic Monkeys; Plan B; Tom Jones; The View; Big Country	Coldplay; Beyoncé; The Script; Slash; Manic Street Preachers; Kesha; N-Dubz; Fun Lovin' Criminals; Clanadonia	Foo Fighters; Pulp; My Chemical Romance; Weezer; Blondie; All Time Low; Cast
Radio 1/NME Stage
Pendulum; White Lies; Twin Atlantic; The Airborne Toxic Event; Kassidy	Swedish House Mafia; The Strokes; Jimmy Eat World; Friendly Fires; OFWGKTA; House of Pain; Her Majesty & The Wolves; Patrick Wolf; Fight Like Apes	Deadmau5; Beady Eye; Tinie Tempah; Bruno Mars; You Me at Six; Kids in Glass Houses; Professor Green; Cherri Bomb; The Phantom Band
King Tut's Wah Wah Tent
2ManyDjs; City and Colour; Eliza Doolittle; Wretch 32; Parade	Primal Scream; Chase & Status; Crystal Castles; Ocean Colour Scene; Chipmunk; The Saturdays; Devlin; Everything Everything	Calvin Harris; Brandon Flowers; KT Tunstall; The Vaccines; Hurts; The Pretty Reckless; The Naked and Famous; Futures; Rival Sons; Neon Trees; Grouplove
Slam Tent
	Dave Clarke; Leftfield (live); Tiga; Vitalic (live); Josh Wink; The Streets (live); Hudson Mohawke (live); James Holden; Craig Richards; Silicone Soul	Felix da Housecat; Bloody Beetroots Death Crew 77 (live); Chris Liebing; Slam (live); Diplo; Benga & Youngman; DJ Sneak; Mathew Jonson (live); The Black Dog; Mark Henning
Red Bull Bedroom Jam Transmissions Stage
Imelda May; British Sea Power; Miles Kane; Mona; Labrinth; Floods; Autumn In Disguise	Bright Eyes; Villagers; Jenny and Johnny; The Saw Doctors; Tame Impala; The Twilight Singers; The Pierces; Wolf Gang; The Ocean Between Us; Makethisrelate; Acoda	Eels; Noah And The Whale; Stornoway; Clare Maguire; Metronomy; Fenech-Soler; Roddy Woomble; Kitty, Daisy & Lewis; Page 44; Hill Valley High; The Hype Theory
BBC Introducing Stage
	Bwani Junction; Navajo Youth; Brooklyn Hype; GoGoBot; The Xcerts; Kid Canaveral; The Mars Patrol; Collectors Club; Gallery 47; Three Blind Wolves; The Heartstrings	Dot J.R.; Chad Valley; By the Rivers; Bronto Skylift; Madhat McGore; Crushing Blows; Fight the Bear; Wrongnote; Our Lost Infantry; The Narrows
T Break Stage
Other People; Aerials Up; Sucioperro; Romance; Evaline; Crayons; Lady North	Boycotts; Conquering Animal Sound; Cancel The Astronauts; Jon Fratelli; The Head and the Heart; Emma's Imagination; The River 68s; Jack Townes; Woodenbox with a Fistful of Fivers; Kristyna Myles; The LaFontaines; Church of When Shit Hits the Fan; Paws	Discopolis; Carnivores; Fatherson; Thrum; Alice Gold; Rachel Sermanni; Transfer; Found; Molotov Jukebox; Marrik Layden Deft with Scatabrainz; United Fruit; Reverieme
