= The Swinging Laurels =

English synth-pop and new wave band

- The Swinging Laurels in 1982. Left to right: John Barrow, Mark O'Hara, Gaz Birtles, and Dean Sargent. Photo by Jill Furmanovsky.

Background information
- Origin: Leicester, England
- Genres: Synth-pop; New wave
- Years active: 1979–1989, 1997, 2023–present
- Labels: Albion Records; Dining Out; WEA Records; Happy Records; Scatola Rosa
- Members: Gaz Birtles; John Barrow
- Past members: Dean Sargent; Mark O'Hara; Nick Murphy; Steve Cooke; Phil Birtles
- Website: theswinginglaurels.co.uk

The Swinging Laurels are an English synth-pop and new wave band formed in Leicester in 1979 by saxophonists Gary "Gaz" Birtles and John Barrow. They achieved independent chart success with their 1981 debut single "Peace of Mind". In addition to releasing their own recordings through Albion Records, WEA Records, and Happy Records, the band's horn section were active as session musicians during the 1980s, recording with acts such as Fun Boy Three and The Apollinaires and touring with Culture Club.

== History ==
=== Formation and early years (1979–1981) ===
Birtles had previously fronted the Leicester ska and rock group The Newmatics (having earlier played in The Wendy Tunes), with Barrow frequently guesting on saxophone. Barrow had also been a member of the funk and disco outfit Black Gorilla, appearing on Top of the Pops in 1977 to promote the novelty single "Gimme Dat Banana" (though the recording itself featured session musicians rather than the touring lineup). In 1979, Birtles and Barrow—who had both worked as apprentice gas fitters—began experimenting with an Elgam organ drum machine, a Roland SH-1 monosynth, and an Akai reel-to-reel tape recorder to construct instrumental tracks blending electronic synthesizer rhythms with saxophone melodies. According to the band, they took their name in 1980 after Birtles walked past a wind-blown laurel bush in a cemetery.

Expanding the lineup to perform live, they brought in former Newmatics drummer Nick Murphy, as well as former Black Gorilla and Sister Big Stuff member Dean Sargent on trumpet and synth bass. Keyboardist Mark O'Hara, who was previously in the punk rock band The Stazers, joined following an advertisement in the local press. Their first live outing involved playing four-song sets across five Leicester pubs in a single night, starting at The White Horse in Oadby and ending at The Haunch of Venison. The group recorded their initial demo tracks—"Swing the Cat" and "Peace of Mind"—at Woodbine Street Studios in Leamington Spa with producer Johnny Rivers, who incorporated an early Clap Trap processor on "Peace of Mind". Following a 1980 single-sided 10-inch acetate on Dead Good, they signed a publishing deal with Albion Music Publishing.

Their debut commercial single, "Peace of Mind" / "Swing the Cat", was released in 1981 on Albion Records and reached number one on the Melody Maker Independent Chart.

=== Major label signing and session work (1982–1983) ===
In 1982, the band recorded a radio session for John Peel on BBC Radio 1 (broadcast in June 1982) as well as a live session for Capital Radio. That same year, they released the four-track 12-inch EP ...A Taste Of on Dining Out Records. After Fun Boy Three's manager saw them perform at a sold-out gig at the Hope & Anchor in Islington, London, the group's horn section became sought after for external studio work. They recorded brass for Fun Boy Three's single "The Telephone Always Rings" (1982, peaking at No. 17 in the UK), appearing with the group on Top of the Pops, Cheggars Plays Pop, and Saturday Superstore, and also played on Fun Boy Three's follow-up hit "Summertime" (No. 18). Other 1980s brass sessions included a Jerry Dammers-produced 2 Tone Records single by The Apollinaires ("The Feeling's Gone"), as well as recordings with Musical Youth, Worldbackwards, Coventry bands Splashdown and Team 23 (later King), and French act 24hrs.

Boy George was a fan of the band and invited them to support Culture Club on two UK tours in 1983 (Barrow later recalled in his memoir that the band were paid £50 per night in total as the support act); although Culture Club also offered them a spot on their American tour, the band's management rejected the offer, believing they should "crack the UK market first".

In autumn 1982, the group signed a £400,000 recording contract with WEA Records, releasing the single "Rodeo" in September, featuring percussive contributions from Scritti Politti drummer Tom Morley. Their follow-up single, "Lonely Boy" (1983), was produced by Steve Levine. Boy George recorded guest backing vocals for the song, but contractual objections from his record label, Virgin Records, required his vocals to be removed prior to the record's commercial release. Commercial sales suffered, and WEA parted ways with the band later that year without issuing a full-length album. Also in 1983, the band recorded a Janice Long session for BBC Radio 1, played a Dutch festival tour supporting Nick Lowe and Osibisa, and recorded "Falling" at Woodbine Street Studios with John Rivers; Albion Records prepared to issue "Falling" as a single, but shelved the release when Culture Club drummer Jon Moss tried to help the band secure a contract with Virgin Records that ultimately fell through.

=== Independent releases and later years (1984–present) ===
After leaving WEA, the band established their own label, Happy Records, based at their Leicester studio Happy House. Shortening their name to The Laurels, they released the single "Zoom (Take the Test)" in 1984, featuring guitarist Rich Barton (later of Diesel Park West) and Ciro Buccheri, with a B-side ("Ramsi Ramsi Ramsi") incorporating a backwards tape loop from Spike Milligan's The Goon Show. Around 1985–1986, the group temporarily performed under the name Happy House, incorporating live drummer Phil Birtles (Gaz's younger brother) and former Special AKA vocalist Rhoda Dakar. They subsequently issued "Push and Shove" on Happy Records (reissued by No Label Records in 1990).

As a session brass section alongside Coalville trumpeter Tony Robinson, Birtles and Barrow joined the rock group Crazyhead on an 11-country European and Scandinavian tour supporting Iggy Pop in 1988, as well as appearing at the 1989 Reading Festival and on Thames Television's The Concert. The Swinging Laurels wound down around 1989. When invited to audition for the brass section of The Beautiful South in 1989, Barrow declined to attend due to work commitments; Birtles and Robinson recruited saxophonist Kev Brown and joined The Beautiful South. After the band split, Birtles also formed the country-pop group Yellowbelly with guitarist David "Wally" Walton and keyboardist Tony Robinson. In 1990, Birtles produced a reggae cover of Manu Dibango's "Big Blow"; labels declined the single (including Go Beat Records, with a rejection letter reportedly signed by Norman Cook), before it was released in 2017 on the digital compilation Greatest Bits - Volume 2. Birtles later co-founded The South in 2007 and toured with Fun Lovin' Criminals, while Barrow continued session work with artists including Norman Beaton, Suggs, Sinéad O'Connor, Beverley Knight, Ali Campbell, Radio Riddler, and Fun Lovin' Criminals. In 2004 (updated in 2007 and 2020), Barrow published a memoir detailing his career, How NOT to Make It in the Pop World: Diary of an Almost Has-Been, featuring a foreword by Fun Lovin' Criminals' Frank Benbini.

Both musicians' sons also pursued music careers: Birtles' son Jordan and Barrow's son Nile formed the Leicester reggae-pop band By the Rivers in 2010, with Birtles' eldest son Peri acting as their producer and sound engineer. Long-time bassist and photographer Steve Cooke, who played on multiple recordings, passed away in August 2024 at the age of 70.

In 1997, Birtles and Barrow reunited as a duo using an 8-track recorder and an Atari computer to create the six-track EP Be Someone. In 2005, they reformed the horn section to record three tracks on the Leicester indie band ist's album King Martha (both the album and single "Here We Go Again" reached number one on Russian legal download charts in 2006), appeared in the "Here We Go Again" music video, and played live with the band at the Summer Sundae festival, later arranging brass for ist's 2009 album Toothpick Bridge. In 2023, they recorded a cover of ist's song "Going Too Far" for Kenton Hall's album Idiopath / Omniopath. Hall later wrote the liner notes for The Swinging Laurels' 2024 album.

In May 2024, Birtles and Barrow compiled their 1983–1996 studio master tapes and cassettes alongside their original 1980s singles into the band's debut full-length archival album, Return to the Future, released in a limited edition of 316 copies by the Leicester independent label Scatola Rosa and distributed through Rough Trade. An early 1982 demo, "Go Out and Find Her", was excluded from the release due to master tape noise-reduction issues.

== Discography ==
=== Studio albums ===
Year	Release Details	Tracklist	Personnel & Label Credits
2024	Return to the Future: Format: LP (Translucent Blue Vinyl) + CD; Label: Scatola Rosa; Catalog: PINK104 / PINK104CD	Vinyl / CD Tracks 1–10: 1. "Building Bridges"; 2. "Epoch of Love"; 3. "Will the Wind Blow"; 4. "Be Someone"; 5. "Stay"; 6. "School of Faith"; 7. "Breath"; 8. "Falling"; 9. "The Shelter"; 10. "I'll Talk to You"; CD Bonus Tracks (1980s Singles): 11. "Peace of Mind"; 12. "Swing the Cat"; 13. "Push and Shove"; 14. "Zoom (Take the Test)"; 15. "Lonely Boy"; 16. "Rodeo"; 17. "Hair By Mantini"	Notes: Archival debut album compiled from studio master tapes and Minidisc/cassette recordings (1983–1996) made at Happy House Studio, Woodbine Street Studios, and Do Not Erase Studio. Limited edition of 316 copies. Liner notes by Kenton Hall.

=== EPs ===
Year	Release Details	Tracklist	Personnel & Label Credits
1982	...A Taste Of: Format: 12" Vinyl EP; Label: Dining Out Records; Catalog: TUX 20	A1: "Bang Bang...Is Anybody There?"; A2: "Death Laurels"; B1: "Disco Laurels"; B2: " One Of Our Saxaphones Is Missing" [sic]	Lineup: Gaz Birtles, John Barrow, Dean Sargent, Mark O'Hara, and Nick Murphy (on "Bang Bang").
1997	Be Someone: Format: CD EP; Label: Happy Records; Catalog: LAF3CD	1. "Be Someone"; 2. "Chicago"; 3. "Swing the Cat"; 4. "My Intentions"; 5. "Peace of Mind"; 6. "Disco Laurels"	Lineup: Gaz Birtles, John Barrow, with guest laurels Nick Murphy and Steve Cooke.

=== Commercial Singles ===
Year	Release Details	Tracklist	Personnel & Label Credits
1981	"Peace of Mind": Format: 7" Single; Label: Albion Records; Catalog: ION 1020	A-Side: "Peace of Mind"; B-Side: "Swing the Cat"	Lineup: Gary Birtles, John Barrow, Nick Murphy.; Production: Johnny Rivers at Woodbine Street Studios. (Also preceded by a 1980 10" Dead Good acetate and accompanied by a 1981 "Swing the Cat" flexi-disc.)
1982	"Rodeo": Format: 7" & 12" Single; Label: WEA Records; Catalog: SAX1 (7") / SAX 1T (12")	A-Side: "Rodeo"; B-Side: "Hair By Mantini" (plus "Go Man Go [Tom Mix]" on 12")	Lineup: Gaz Birtles, John Barrow, Dean Sargent, Mark O'Hara.; Guest Musicians: Tom Morley (Scritti Politti) on percussion.
1983	"Lonely Boy": Format: 7" & 12" Single; Label: WEA Records; Catalog: X 9894 (7") / X 9894T (12") / P-1763 (Japan 7")	A-Side: "Lonely Boy"; B-Side: "Voice Of The Mountains" (plus "Street Of A Thousand Bongoes" and "(Another) Lonely Boy" on 12")	Lineup: Gaz Birtles, John Barrow, Dean Sargent, Mark O'Hara.; Production: Steve Levine.; Notes: Guest backing vocals originally recorded by Boy George were removed prior to release due to Virgin Records contractual disputes.
1984	"Zoom (Take the Test)": Format: 7" Promo & 12" Single; Label: Happy Records; Catalog: LAF 1TS (7" Promo) / LAF 1T (12")	A-Side: "Zoom (Take the Test)"; B-Side: "Ramsi Ramsi Ramsi"	Lineup: Gaz Birtles, John Barrow, Mark O'Hara.; Guest Musicians: Rick Barton, Ciro Buccheri.
1989	"Push and Shove": Format: 7" Single; Label: No Label / Happy Records; Catalog: NOS 42 / DON-1	A-Side: "Push and Shove"; B-Side: "Closer"	Lineup: Gaz Birtles, John Barrow, Mark O'Hara, Steve Cooke.

=== Compilations & Box Sets ===
Year	Release Details	Tracklist & Album Layout	Personnel & Label Credits
2001	Greatest Bits: Format: CD-R / CD Compilation; Label: Happy Records (2002)	1. "Lonely Boy" (12"); 2. "Building Bridges"; 3. "Closer"; 4. "Peace of Mind"; 5. "Push and Shove"; 6. "Stranger Than Fiction"; 7. "Will the Wind Blow"; 8. "Falling"; 9. "Breath"; 10. "Epoch of Love"; 11. "Stay"; 12. "Hair By Mantini"; 13. "Rodeo" (12")	Lineup: Gaz Birtles, John Barrow, Mark O'Hara, Dean Sargent, with guest laurels Steve Cooke and Phil Birtles.; Notes: CD compilation featuring tracks recorded throughout the 1980s.
2012	Cheap Tricks In A Box: Dining Out Records 1979–1982: Format: CD Compilation; Label: Cherry Red Records / Dining Out; Catalog: TUX 23	Track 20: "Disco Laurels"; Track 21: "Death Laurels"	Lineup: Gary Birtles, John Barrow, Mark O'Hara, Dean Sargent.; Notes: Features the band's two earliest archival tracks recorded during their initial sessions for the Dining Out label.
2017	The John Peel Sessions: Format: Digital download	1. "Swing the Cat"; 2. "Murder Mile"; 3. "Beating Heart"; 4. "Rodeo"	Lineup: Gary Birtles, John Barrow, Mark O'Hara, Dean Sargent.
2017	Greatest Bits - Volume 2: Format: Digital download	1. "Swing the Cat"; 2. "One of Our Saxophones Is Missing"; 3. "Moving Up"; 4. "James Brown"; 5. "Steam"; 6. "Chicago"; 7. "Beating Heart"; 8. "School of Faith"; 9. "Going Nowhere"; 10. "Big Blow"; 11. "Gimme Strength"	Lineup: Gary Birtles, John Barrow, Mark O'Hara, Dean Sargent, with guest laurels Steve Cooke and Phil Birtles.
