= Emily Padgett =

American actress, singer, and dancer (born 1984)

- Born: October 20, 1984 (age 41); Danbury, Connecticut, U.S.
- Education: Oklahoma State University, American Musical and Dramatic Academy
- Occupations: Actress, singer, dancer
- Years active: 2005–present
- Spouse: Josh Young (m. 2018)
- Children: 2

Emily Padgett (born September 20, 1984) is an American actress, singer, and dancer.

She is known for her work on Broadway as Daisy Hilton in Side Show and Sherrie Christian in Rock of Ages, as well as for originating the roles of Lucy Grant in Steve Martin and Edie Brickell's Bright Star, and Mrs. Bucket in Charlie and the Chocolate Factory.

== Life and career ==
=== 1984–2008: Early life, Cats, and Broadway Debut ===
Padgett was born in Danbury, Connecticut, but moved to Lewisville, North Carolina in 1986 when she was two. Her love for musical theatre started at an early age when her parents would go to New York City on vacation, bringing home cast recordings for Padgett as souvineres. She took part in her high school theatre program, being cast as Maria in West Side Story at sixteen, a role she "had no business playing." Eager to work and get out of North Carolina, Padgett enrolled in the two-year program at the American Musical and Dramatic Academy in New York City, as opposed to a traditional four-year program. Following graduation, Padgett quickly booked the role of Demeter in the non-Equity national tour cast of Andrew Lloyd Webber's Cats in 2005. She departed the tour after a year, and started attending open calls in the city while balancing odd jobs. Padgett danced at bar mitzvahs and entertained at children's birthday parties as Nemo from Disney's Finding Nemo. In 2007, she made her Broadway debut in Grease in the ensemble, and as a swing, understudying Sandy, Patty, and Cha-Cha. In 2008, Padgett departed the production and joined the cast of Legally Blonde, as Cece/District Attorney, and understudying Shandi/Brooke, Margot, and Pilar. After Legally Blonde closed, Padgett was offered the role of Sandy in the first national tour company of Grease. She played the role for a year.

=== 2009–2013: Rock of Ages and Flashdance ===
In 2009, Padgett was cast as Waitress #1, and understudied Kerry Butler's role in the rock musical Rock of Ages on Broadway. In 2010, Kerry Butler departed the production, and Padgett was cast as her replacement, making Sherrie Christian the first lead role Padgett played on Broadway. Padgett departed in 2011. In 2011, Padgett starred as Eden in the Whoopi Goldberg-produced White Noise: A Cautionary Musical at the Royal George Theatre in Chicago. After the show closed, Padgett shortly returned to Rock of Ages as Sherrie. In 2013, Padgett was cast as Alex Owens in the musical version of the 1983 film Flashdance.

=== 2014–16: Side Show and Bright Star ===
In 2014, Padgett starred as Daisy Hilton in Side Show at Kennedy Center for the Performing Arts and La Jolla Playhouse. On September 12, 2014, it was announced that Padgett would star in the Broadway revival opposite Erin Davie. The revival closed on January 4, 2015. On April 17, 2015, it was announced that Padgett would star in Waterfall, a new musical, at the Pasadena Playhouse. On October 26, 2015, it was announced that Padgett would star as Lucy Grant in Steve Martin and Edie Brickell's new musical, Bright Star. The show began previews at the Cort Theatre on Broadway on February 25, 2016, before officially opening on March 24. The musical closed on June 26, 2016, after 30 previews and 109 regular performances.

=== 2016–present: Sweet Charity and Charlie and the Chocolate Factory ===
On August 9, 2016, it was announced that Padgett would join Sutton Foster in a limited run, off-Broadway revival of Sweet Charity. The show closed on January 8, 2017. On December 19, 2016, it was announced that Padgett would star as Mrs. Bucket in Charlie and the Chocolate Factory.

== Theatre credits ==
Year(s)	Production	Role	Location	Category
2005	Cats	Demeter	—N/a	Non-Equity Tour
2007	Grease	Ensemble (Sandy Dumbrowski u/s, Patty Simcox u/s, Cha-Cha u/s)	Brooks Atkinson Theater	Broadway
2008	Legally Blonde	Cece/District Attorney/Ensemble (Shandi/Brooke Wyndham u/s, Margot u/s, Pilar u/s) [Replacement]	Palace Theatre	Broadway
2009	Grease	Sandy Dumbrowski	—N/a	National Tour
2009	Rock of Ages	Waitress #1/Ensemble (Replacement)	Brooks Atkinson Theater	Broadway
2010–11	Rock of Ages	Sherrie Christian (Replacement)	Brooks Atkinson Theater	Broadway
2011	White Noise: A Cautionary Musical	Eden	Royal George Theatre	Regional
2012	Rock of Ages	Sherrie Christian (Replacement)	Helen Hayes Theatre	Broadway
2013	Flashdance	Alex Owens	—N/a	National Tour
2014–15	Side Show	Daisy Hilton	St. James Theatre	Broadway
2015	Waterfall	Katherine	Pasadena Playhouse	Regional
2015	Seaplane	Katie Stephens	Pensacola Saenger Theatre	Regional
2015	Bright Star	Lucy Grant	Kennedy Center	Regional
2016	Bright Star	Lucy Grant	Cort Theatre	Broadway
2016	Sweet Charity	Helene	Signature Theatre	Off-Broadway
2017	Charlie and the Chocolate Factory	Mrs. Bucket	Lunt-Fontanne Theatre	Broadway
2022	Sunday in the Park with George	Dot / Marie	Shea's 710 Theatre	Regional

== Filmography ==
=== Television ===
Year	Title	Role	Notes
2012	Louie	Grown Lilly	Episode: "New Year's Eve"

== Discography ==
- 2007: Grease (2007 New Broadway Cast Recording)
- 2013: Flashdance (Original Demo Cast Recording)
- 2014: Side Show (2014 New Broadway Cast Recording)
- 2013: Side Show: Added Attractions (2014 New Broadway Cast Live at 54 Below)
- 2013: Bright Star (Original Broadway Cast Recording)
- 2013: Charlie and the Chocolate Factory (Original Broadway Cast Recording)

== Awards and nominations ==
Year	Association	Category	Title of work	Result	Ref.
2017	Fred & Adele Astaire Award	Outstanding Female Dancer in an Off-Broadway Show	Sweet Charity	Nominated	

== Personal life ==
On January 12, 2017, Padgett got engaged to actor Josh Young. They were married on June 3, 2018. The couple welcomed their first child, a daughter named Adele May Young, on February 3, 2019.
