= Kraig Thornber =

British actor, singer and choreographer (born 1961)

Kraig Thornber (born 1961) is a British actor, singer and choreographer best known for playing the handyman Riff Raff in The Rocky Horror Show and Grandpa George in the musical Charlie and the Chocolate Factory. He is a former member of the National Theatre.

== Early life ==
Born as Craig Thornber in Leicester in 1961, the son of Terence A. Thornber and Sheila (née Baxter), Kraig 'Pix' Thornber attended Bosworth Community College in Leicestershire before training for three years at East 15 Acting School, graduating in 1987.

== Theatre career ==
In the West End he has appeared in Guys and Dolls, Rosencrantz and Guildenstern are Dead, Oh, What a Lovely War at the National Theatre, Ariel in the original production of Return to the Forbidden Planet (1989) at the Cambridge Theatre and Riff Raff in The Rocky Horror Show at the Duke of York's Theatre (1994) and on the national tour.

Thornber's other theatre credits include The Beggar's Opera (Théâtre des Bouffes du Nord in Paris); Sugar (Clwyd Theatr Cymru and the New Wolsey Theatre, Ipswich); Brassed Off (York Theatre Royal and UK No.1 Tour); The Government Inspector (Northern Broadsides); The Threepenny Opera, Happy End and A Family Affair for Clwyd Theatr Cymru; A Mad World, My Masters; Riff Raff in The Rocky Horror Tribute Show (2006); Mr Mushnik in Little Shop of Horrors (2009 UK national tour); Sir Andrew Aguecheek in Twelfth Night (2009) Stafford Festival Shakespeare; Park Keeper in Mary Poppins (2008-9 UK national tour); A Midsummer Night's Dream and Ebenezer Scrooge in A Christmas Carol (2009–10) for the Stephen Joseph Theatre in Scarborough; Oberon/Theseus in A Midsummer Night's Dream (2010) and The Mikado in The Mikado (2010) for the Stephen Joseph Theatre; Abanazer in the pantomime Aladdin (2013–14) at the De Montfort Hall in Leicester; an Ugly Sister in Cinderella (2010–11) at the Belgrade Theatre in Coventry; Nanny Nora in Sleeping Beauty (2011–12) at the Royal Spa Centre in Leamington Spa; Bob Sidebottom in an adaptation of Gogol's The Government Inspector (2012) by Deborah McAndrew at the Harrogate Theatre; Horace Percival in Somewhere in England for Clwyd Theatr Cymru (2014) The Front Page (Chichester Festival Theatre); Fagin in Oliver! (New Vic Theatre); A Funny Thing Happened on the Way to the Forum; The Millennium Mysteries; Kurtz in Heart of Darkness (Teatr Biuro Podróży, Poland); The Emcee in Cabaret; Puck in A Midsummer Night's Dream (Queen's Theatre, Hornchurch); Façade (Pocket Opera); Loot (Watford Palace Theatre); The Gambler (Everyman Theatre, Liverpool) and Grandpa George in Charlie and the Chocolate Factory (2015–17) at the Theatre Royal, Drury Lane.

== Film and television ==
His film and television appearances includes Dog-Boy in Liquid Television (1992); Brian Osbourne/Van Driver in The Bill (1988–2004); A Thing Called Love (2004); Crimewatch File (BBC); Riff Raff in The Rocky Horror Tribute Show (2006); Bar Sub Con in Inception (2010) and Gulag Prisoner in Muppets Most Wanted (2014). As a dancer he has performed in the films Gulliver's Travels (2010) and Alice Through the Looking Glass (2016).

== Choreography ==
Thornber's choreography and Musical Staging credits include Murderous Instinct at the Theatre Royal, Norwich and the Savoy Theatre in London; Sweeney Todd and Cinderella (New Wolsey Theatre, Ipswich); The Threepenny Opera and Cinderella (Clwyd Theatr Cymru); Keep on Running, Face, Cabaret, Pump Boys and Dinettes and The Comedy of Errors (Queen's Theatre, Hornchurch); Phoenix and the Carpet and The Lost Dragon (Gateway Theatre, Chester), and Three Minute Heroes (Belgrade Theatre). He played drums with The Apollinaires, a British 2 Tone/post-punk group. For Big Finish Productions audio dramas based on the long-running British science fiction television series Doctor Who he was Commander Pokol in Arrangements for War and Lord Paranesh in The Draconian Rage.
