= Tom Hewitt (actor) =

American actor

- Born: c. 1957 (age 68–69)
- Education: University of Wisconsin–Milwaukee
- Occupations: Actor; singer

Tom Hewitt (born c. 1957) is an American actor and Broadway stage performer, and a native of Victor, Montana. His Broadway credits include leading roles in Chicago, Hadestown, Dracula, Jesus Christ Superstar, The Lion King, The Rocky Horror Show, and Doctor Zhivago.

== Early life and career ==
After graduating from the University of Wisconsin–Milwaukee with the Professional Theatre Training Program's first class in 1981, Tom Hewitt worked with such regional powerhouses as Minneapolis's Guthrie Theatre, the Arena Stage in Washington, D.C., and the Berkshire Theatre Festival in New England before heading to New York and the commercial stage.

Hewitt trained and worked with Japanese director Tadashi Suzuki for over a decade, including playing the title role in Suzuki's only production with an all-American cast, an English language version of his Shakespeare adaptation, The Tale of Lear.

== Later career ==
While in the first part of his career he appeared primarily in straight plays, such as Beau Jest and Jeffrey, once in New York he became better known for his performances in musicals. On Broadway, Hewitt has appeared in The Lion King, Art, The School for Scandal, The Sisters Rosensweig, The Boys from Syracuse, Jesus Christ Superstar, Amazing Grace, and Hadestown. He was nominated for a Tony Award for his portrayal of Frank-N-Furter in the 2000 revival of The Rocky Horror Show.

Hewitt's Off-Broadway credits include acting in a New York Shakespeare Festival production of Othello. Tom Hewitt's first above-title credit came when he played the title role of Dracula in Frank Wildhorn's Dracula, The Musical on Broadway from August 19, 2004 – January 2, 2005. In 2006–2007, he headlined in the national touring Broadway production of the musical Dirty Rotten Scoundrels. He received a 2007 Touring Broadway Award.

In November 2009, he began his two-month run in Peter Pan as Captain Hook/Mr. Darling at the Mansion Theater in Branson, Missouri with Cathy Rigby in the lead role. He reprised this role in the national tour, which began performances August 2011. In February 2010, he was in the National Tour of Chicago. In October 2013, he performed in New York City in a one-person show called Another Medea.

For a limited time, starting in September 2021, Hewitt played Hades in the reopening of the Broadway production of Hadestown after the COVID-19 pandemic, serving as a temporary replacement for Patrick Page. After two stints in the Broadway revival of Chicago as Billy Flynn, Hewitt returned to Hadestown in June, 2022, again serving as a temporary replacement for Page. Following Page's retirement from the show in December, 2022, Hewitt was announced as his permanent replacement. Hewitt made his final performance of this stint on September 3, 2023. On January 14, 2025, Hewitt returned to Hadestown replacing Phillip Boykin.

== Theatre credits ==
Year	Title	Role	Theater	Notes
1988	The Tale of Lear	Lear	Arena Stage, Berkeley Repertory Theater, Milwaukee Repertory Theater, StageWest	Regional co-production. Directed by Tadashi Suzuki
1991	Othello	Lodovico	New York Shakespeare Festival	Off-Broadway
1993-94	The Sisters Rosensweig	Geoffrey Duncan	Ethel Barrymore Theatre	Broadway (replacement)
1995	The School for Scandal	Charles Surface	Lyceum Theatre	Original Broadway Revival Cast
1999-2000	The Lion King	Scar	New Amsterdam Theatre	Broadway (replacement)
2000-01	The Rocky Horror Show	Dr. Frank-N-Furter	Circle in the Square Theatre	Original Broadway Revival Cast
2002	The Boys from Syracuse	Antipholus of Ephesus	American Airlines Theatre	Original Broadway Revival Cast
2003-04	Urinetown	Officer Lockstock	Various	National Tour
2004-05	Dracula, the Musical	Count Dracula	Belasco Theatre	Original Broadway Cast
2005	Doctor Dolittle	Dr. John P. Dolittle	Various	National Tour
2006-07	Dirty Rotten Scoundrels	Lawrence Jameson	Various	National Tour
2008	Peter Pan	Mr. Darling Captain Hook	Pittsburgh CLO	Regional
2008-10	Chicago	Billy Flynn	Ambassador Theatre	Broadway Revival (replacement)
2010	Titanic	Thomas Andrews	The Muny	Regional
2010	The Sound of Music	Captain Georg von Trapp	The Muny	Regional
2010-11	Chicago	Billy Flynn	Ambassador Theatre	Broadway Revival (replacement)
2011	Kiss Me, Kate	Fred Graham Petruchio	The Muny	Regional
2011-12	Peter Pan	Mr. Darling Captain Hook	Various	National Tour
2012	Jesus Christ Superstar	Pontius Pilate	Neil Simon Theatre	Original Broadway Revival Cast
2012	Jekyll & Hyde	Sir Danvers Carew	-	Concept recording
2013	Chicago	Billy Flynn	Wells Fargo Pavilion	Regional
2013	Chicago	Billy Flynn	Various	National Tour
2014	Monty Python's Spamalot	King Arthur	Pittsburgh CLO	Regional
2015	Doctor Zhivago	Viktor Komarovsky	Broadway Theatre	Original Broadway Cast
2015	Amazing Grace	Captain Newton	Nederlander Theatre	Original Broadway Cast
2016	Finding Neverland	Charles Frohman Captain Hook	Various	National Tour
2016	Chicago	Billy Flynn	Various	National Tour
2016-19	Chicago	Billy Flynn	Ambassador Theatre	Broadway Revival (replacement)
2019	Sweeney Todd: The Demon Barber of Fleet Street	Sweeney Todd	Provincetown Theater	Regional
2019-20	Chicago	Billy Flynn	Ambassador Theatre	Broadway Revival (replacement)
2021	Hadestown	Hades	Walter Kerr Theatre	Broadway (replacement)
2021-22	Chicago	Billy Flynn	Ambassador Theatre	Broadway Revival (replacement)
2022-23	Hadestown	Hades	Walter Kerr Theatre	Broadway (replacement)
2023	Another Medea	Solo Performer	Provincetown Theater	Regional
2024	Midnight in the Garden of Good and Evil	Jim Williams	Goodman Theatre	World Premiere
2025	Hadestown	Hades	Walter Kerr Theatre	Broadway (replacement)
