= Charlie and the Chocolate Factory (musical) =

2013 musical

- Official London Logo artwork
- Music: Marc Shaiman; Anthony Newley (original 1971 songs)
- Lyrics: Marc Shaiman; Scott Wittman; Leslie Bricusse (original 1971 songs)
- Book: David Greig
- Basis: Charlie and the Chocolate Factory by: Roald Dahl
- Productions: 2013 West End; 2017 Broadway; 2018 US tour 2020 US tour 2022 UK tour 2027 West End revival

Charlie and the Chocolate Factory is a musical based on the 1964 children's novel by Roald Dahl, with book by David Greig, music by Marc Shaiman and lyrics by Shaiman and Scott Wittman, with original songs from the 1971 film Willy Wonka & the Chocolate Factory by Leslie Bricusse and Anthony Newley.

Directed by Sam Mendes, the musical premiered in the West End at the Theatre Royal Drury Lane in June 2013 and ran for 3 years and 7 months before closing on 7 January 2017. In 2013 the production broke the record for weekly ticket sales in London. While receiving mixed reviews from critics, the show won two Laurence Olivier Awards in 2014 for Best Costume Design and Best Lighting Design. The show was reworked for a Broadway production opening in April 2017 at the Lunt-Fontanne Theatre and ran almost nine months before closing in January 2018. A U.S. tour opened 21 September 2018 at Shea's Performing Arts Center in Buffalo, New York and an Australian tour at Capitol Theatre on 11 January 2019. A second U.S. tour launched on 1 January 2020 in Miami, Florida. The Broadway version of the musical has been acquired for licensing rights in North America, Europe and Australia by Music Theatre International.

== Background ==
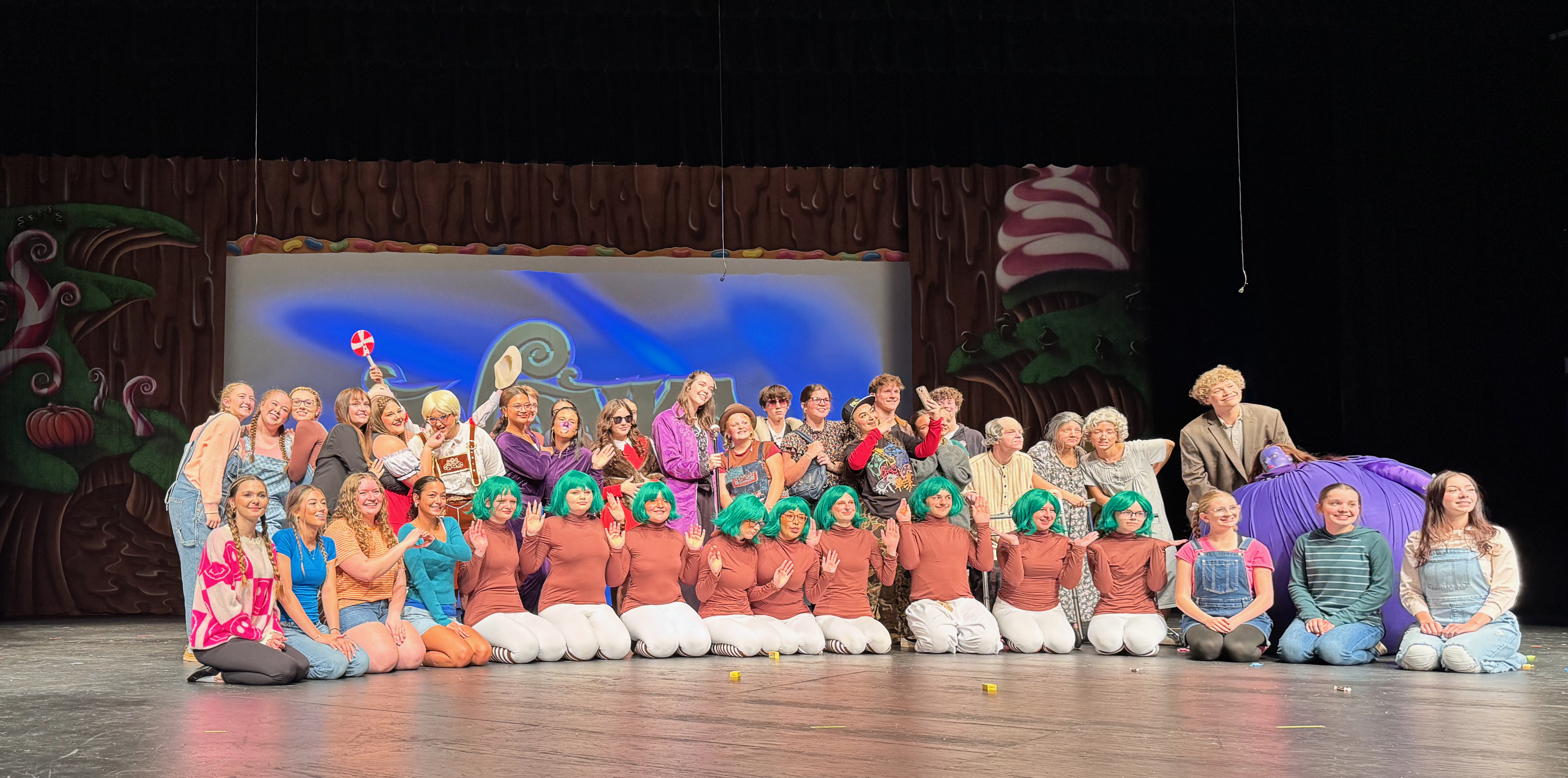
The cast of Willy Wonka & the Chocolate Factory at Union County High School

The musical is based on the 1964 children's novel by Roald Dahl. Producers held a first reading of the first act from the show in New York City in May 2010, with the intention of opening in London the following year.

Officially confirmed on 18 June 2012, producers announced that the show would play the London Palladium beginning in May 2013, with tickets going on sale in October 2012, before the venue was later changed to the Theatre Royal Drury Lane.

The book was written by playwright David Greig with original score composed by Marc Shaiman and lyrics by Scott Wittman and Shaiman. The production was directed by Sam Mendes, with choreography by Peter Darling, accompanied with the assistance of Brandon Duncan, set design by Mark Thompson and lighting design by Paul Pyant.

The show presents a more contemporary version of the original story. During previews, many changes were made, most significantly the addition of the Great Glass Elevator.

== Production history ==
=== West End (2013–2017) ===
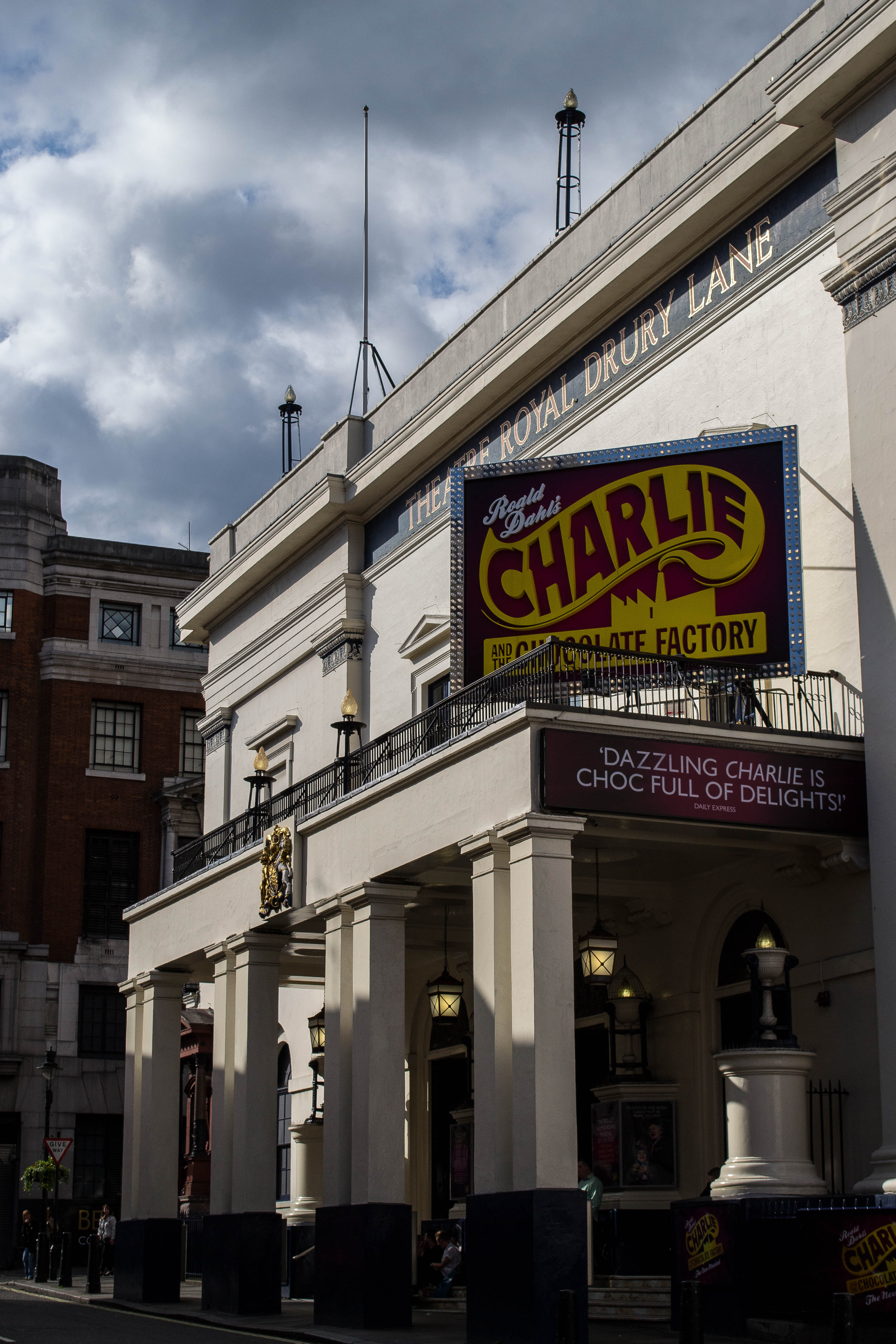
Charlie and the Chocolate Factory billboards at the Theatre Royal, Drury Lane in 2014.

Charlie and the Chocolate Factory was scheduled to begin previews on 17 May 2013, at the Theatre Royal, Drury Lane, London, before holding its official opening night on 25 June 2013. The show was originally scheduled to open at the London Palladium. Previews of the show were delayed by five days until 22 May, due to "unforeseen problems in the delivery of a piece of stage engineering by a contractor". Shortly after opening night the show's producers extended booking period through May 2014, with a further extension to November 2014, after ticket sales of approximately 300,000 through October 2013. In February 2015, the production booking was further extended through 3 December 2016. The show currently holds the record for the highest weekly gross in the West End, with an income of £1,080,260 during the week commencing 30 December 2013. The first major cast change took place in May 2014, when Alex Jennings replaced Hodge as Wonka. In May 2015 a second cast change took place, with Jonathan Slinger as Wonka.

On 23 February 2016, producers once again extended booking through January 2017. The production closed on 7 January 2017.

=== Broadway (2017–2018) ===
A reworked version of the show opened on Broadway in Spring 2017 with changes including new direction by Jack O'Brien, new choreography by Josh Bergasse and a new set design by original designer Mark Thompson. Due to other commitments, Mendes stayed as producer only, but did participate in the selection of O'Brien as replacement director. O'Brien stated the score would pay homage to the Leslie Bricusse/Anthony Newley songs written for the 1971 film and would also feature the songs written by Shaiman and Wittman. In August 2016, O'Brien confirmed that "The Candy Man" and "Pure Imagination" would be included in the musical.

On 9 May 2016, producers announced that the show would open at the Lunt-Fontanne Theatre starring Christian Borle as Willy Wonka, Jake Ryan Flynn, Ryan Foust, and Ryan Sell as Charlie Bucket, John Rubinstein as Grandpa Joe, Emily Padgett as Mrs. Bucket, Jackie Hoffman as Mrs. Teavee, Kathy Fitzgerald as Mrs. Gloop, Alan H. Green as Mr. Beauregarde, Trista Dollison as Violet Beauregarde, Ben Crawford as Mr. Salt, Mike Wartella as Mike Teavee, Emma Pfaeffle as Veruca Salt, and F. Michael Haynie as Augustus Gloop. Previews began on 28 March 2017 with the opening night on 23 April 2017. Reviews of the production were mixed to negative, with some critics citing poor staging and restructuring of the story as primary issues.

For this production, the characters Augustus Gloop, Violet Beauregarde, Veruca Salt and Mike Teavee are played by adult actors, unlike the child actors in the London production, while the role of Charlie is still played by a child actor.

On 15 November 2017, producers announced that production would close on 14 January 2018, after 27 previews and 305 performances.

=== US national tours (2018–2022) ===
The 1st national tour of Charlie and the Chocolate Factory premiered on 21 September 2018 in Buffalo, New York at Shea's Performing Arts Center. It was a replica of the Broadway production, with an updated set, utilizing several LED screens around the stage. The show starred Noah Weisberg as Willy Wonka, James Young as Grandpa Joe and Amanda Rose as Mrs. Bucket, with the role of Charlie being alternated between Henry Boshart, Collin Jeffery and Rueby Wood. Reviews for the 1st national tour were mixed. The production closed on 13 October 2019 in Tampa, Florida.

The 2nd national tour started in Miami, Florida in January 2020 featuring Non-Equity actors. Willy Wonka was played by Cody Garcia, Grandpa Joe was played by Steve McCoy, Mrs. Bucket was played by Caitlin Lester-Sams, and the role of Charlie Bucket alternated between both Brody Bett and Ryan Umbarila. The 2nd national tour had another update on its scenic design, utilizing only one large LED screen, rather than several. The 2nd national tour took a pause in March 2020 (while in Grand Rapids, Michigan), due to the COVID-19 pandemic, and resumed on 12 October 2021 in Syracuse, New York. As Charlie Bucket, the boys alternating the role were Jackson Greenspan, Kai Edgar, Coleman Simmons, and William Goldsman. The tour closed on 19 June 2022 in Salt Lake City, Utah, at the Eccles Theatre.

=== Australian tour (2019–2021) ===
Previews of the Australian premiere of the musical was held at Sydney's Capitol Theatre on 5 January 2019 and opened on the 11th. The musical is a replica production of the US tour. On 13 October the primary cast was announced and includes U.S. actor Paul Slade Smith (who played Grandpa George in the original cast on Broadway) as Willy Wonka alongside Australian actors Tony Sheldon as Grandpa Joe and Lucy Maunder as Mrs Bucket. In Sydney, the role of Charlie was shared between Tommy Blair, Ryan Yates, Xion Jarvis and Oliver Alkhair. After ending its Sydney run on Sunday 28 July, the show transferred to Melbourne in August 2019 at Her Majesty's Theatre. The show was initially scheduled to head to Brisbane in March 2020 at the Lyric Theatre, QPAC, but was postponed due to the COVID-19 pandemic. The show reopened in Brisbane on 2 September 2021. Stephen Anderson, who previously played Mr. Salt in the production took over the role of Willy Wonka. The tour made its final stop Perth in November 2021.

=== UK and Ireland tour (2022–2024) ===
The musical had its UK regional premiere at the Leeds Playhouse from 18 November 2022 to 28 January 2023 in a new production directed by James Brining and designed by Simon Higlett. Casting was announced on 26 September 2022 including Gareth Snook as Willy Wonka. The musical reintroduced some musical numbers from the original London production, as well as rewrote the book itself to match. This version also introduced the song “You Got Whatcha Want”, a reworked version of Violet's demise musical number, “Juicy!”, which is now included in the licensable version of the show, through Music Theatre International. Following the run in Leeds, the production toured the UK and Ireland from February 2023 to February 2024.

=== Leicester and London revival (2026–2027) ===
A revival directed by Nikolai Foster will run at the Curve, Leicester from 21 November 2026 until 16 January 2027, starring Jonny Fines as Willy Wonka. On 2 September 2026, it was announced that the production will run at the London Coliseum from 4 June to 18 September 2027, starring Michael Ball as Willy Wonka.

=== Other international productions ===
The first non-English production of Charlie and the Chocolate Factory opened on 8 November 2019 at La Fabbrica del Vapore in Milan, Italy. The production starred Christian Ginepro as Willy Wonka, with the role of Charlie shared between Gregorio Jeesee Cattaneo, Alessandro Notari, and Alberto Salve. The show closed on 23 February 2020, due to the Coronavirus pandemic.

A Norwegian production of the show opened on 9 November 2019 at Det Norske Teatret. Fridtjof Stensæth Josefsen portrayed Willy Wonka, while Ole Opsal Stavrum and Peter Andreas Hjellnes Moseng shared the role of Charlie.

A Brazilian production was announced in November 2019, produced by Atelier de Cultura. Cleto Baccic stars as Willy Wonka. The five children are played by child actors, as in the original London production. The show was planned to open in March 2020, at the Teatro Alfa in São Paulo. However, due to the Coronavirus pandemic, the season was postponed. The show eventually opened on 17 September 2021 at the Teatro Renault. The production closed on 19 December 2021.

In November 2019, Alexandre Piot announced that a French production of Charlie and the Chocolate Factory would open in Paris on 23 September 2020 at the Théâtre du Gymnase Marie Bell, with Arnaud Denissel in the role of Willy Wonka. Like the London production, the five kids are all played by child actors. Due to the COVID-19 pandemic, the show was postponed. The show opened on 31 October 2021. The show moved to the Théâtre Marigny on 18 February 2022 and closed on 9 April 2022.

A Danish production opened at the Aarhus Theatre on 6 May 2021. Simon Mathew played Willy Wonka and Anders Baggesen played Grandpa Joe, while the role of Charlie was shared between Bertram Jarkilde and Oskar Mehlbye. The production closed at the Aarhus Theatre on 19 June 2021. The show transferred to the Østre Gasværk Teater on 11 February 2022 with Cartsen Svendsen in the role of Willy Wonka, alongside Kurt Ravn as Grandpa Joe and Bertram Hasforth Klem and Bertram Jarkilde sharing the role of Charlie. The production closed on 10 April 2022.

In June 2020, Deep Bridge announced a Flemish production of Charlie and the Chocolate Factory with Nordin De Moor as Willy Wonka. Originally scheduled to open in December 2021, this production opened on 11 December 2022 at Stadsschouwburg Antwerpen. The making of this production and the reveal of the actors playing Charlie were discussed in the documentary series "Getekend Charlie Bucket" ("Signed Charlie Bucket"). The show will be returning in the 2024 holiday season.

A Dutch production of Charlie and the Chocolate Factory began touring the Netherlands on 26 August 2022 at the Zaantheater. Much like the West End production, the five kids are played by child actors. In July 2022, it was announced that Remko Vridag will play Willy Wonka.

A Spanish production ran from 22 September 2022 to 9 April 2023 at Espacio Ibercaja Delicias in Madrid, with Edu Soto as Willy Wonka. After closing in Madrid, the show toured Spain from 6 October 2023 to 4 February 2024, with Daniel Diges as Willy Wonka.

A Japanese production opened on 9 October 2023 at the Imperial Theatre in Tokyo, with Koichi Domoto from KinKi Kids as Willy Wonka, Alisa Mizuki as Mrs. Bucket, Kumiko Mori and Honoka Suzuki as Mrs. Gloop, Yūji Kishi as Mr. Salt, Kazumasa Koura as Mr. Beauregarde, Mao Ayabuki as Mrs. Teavee and Kazuki Kosakai as Grandpa Joe. As in the London production, the five children are all played by child actors with Osuke Ono, Cho Shi and Koki Wakusawa sharing the role of Charlie Bucket, Ryunosuke Kuroiwa and Reisa Goto sharing the role of Augustus Gloop, Aone Maisaki and Rimu Miyake sharing the role of Veruca Salt, Hiname Utada and Yuzuki Doi sharing the role of Violet Beauregarde and Hisato Suzuki and Seita Nakano sharing the role of Mike Teavee. After performing in Tokyo, the production stopped in Fukuoka and Osaka in January 2024.

A revival of the Japanese production premiered on 27 March 2026 at Westa Kawagoe in Saitama, before transferring to the Nissay Theatre in Tokyo on 7 April 2025. Several cast members will reprise their roles, including Koichi Domoto as Willy Wonka, Alisa Mizuki as Mrs. Bucket, Honoka Suzuki as Mrs. Gloop, Yūji Kishi as Mr. Salt, Kazumasa Koura as Mr. Beauregarde, Mao Ayabuki as Mrs. Teavee and Kazuki Kosakai as Grandpa Joe. As with the previous production, the five kids are played by child actors with Teruhisa Kogane, Souta Takigami and Yukiya Furusho sharing the role of Charlie Bucket, Soh Arisawa and Hayato Watanabe sharing the role of Augustus Gloop, Miran Terada and Nonoka Hara sharing the role of Veruca Salt, Rikka Kimura and Leanne Yoshida sharing the role of Violet Beauregarde and Takara Ozono and Shinta Koyama sharing the role of Mike Teavee.

A Greek production of Charlie and the Chocolate Factory ran from 22 December 2023 to 25 February 2024 at the Embassy Theater in Athens, Greece. The production starred Alexandros Bourdoumis as Willy Wonka and Petros Xekoukis as Grandpa Joe, with Spyros Dougias and George Karamolegos sharing the role of Charlie Bucket. The show was revived the following year, running from 23 November 2024 to 5 January 2025.

On 2 October 2023, it was announced a Swedish production of Charlie and the Chocolate Factory would premiere in September 2024 at the Gothenburg opera house. Ola Salo starred as Willy Wonka, while Elly Lagerwall, Edith Lyttkens, Isak Nilsson and Leo Stadelmann Andréas shared the role of Charlie. This version follows the book of the original West End production.

An international tour kicked off on 23 October 2025 at the Dongguan International Arts Festival in China, touring multiple cities in Asia. The world tour stars Daniel Plimpton as Willy Wonka, with Cohen Toukatly, Jules Presley, and Parker Spagnuolo alternating as Charlie. Steve McCoy reprised his role as Grandpa Joe from the 2nd national tour.

An Argentinian production is set to open on 4 June 2026 at the Teatro Gran Rex in Buenos Aires, Argentina. Agustín Aristarán will star as Willy Wonka, alongside Sebastián Almada as Grandpa Joe and María del Cerro as Mrs. Bucket. The five kids will be played by child actors, with Mateo Argibay, Dante Barbera, Camilo Aizenberg, and Juan Martín Flores sharing the role of Charlie.

A production of Charlie and The Chocolate Factory will open onboard Royal Caribbean International's ship Legend of the Seas in 2026.

== Synopsis ==
=== London ===
==== Act I ====
The play opens with Charlie Bucket searching for valuables in a dump near his home. As he picks up candy wrappers, he speaks with a mysterious tramp, and heads home to his family ("Almost Nearly Perfect"). His home is a one-room shack under a railway arch. As he and his grandparents wait for their cabbage soup to boil, they tell Charlie about Willy Wonka ("The Amazing Tale of Mr. Willy Wonka"). After Charlie's father returns home dispirited from lack of work Charlie's mother tries to lift his spirits by saying he will find work when the parents begin singing about Charlie and what they have ("If Your Mother Were Here") later Charlie pens a letter about what he'd invented for his family to Wonka, folds it into a paper airplane and sends it flying out into the night ("A Letter from Charlie Bucket").

The next morning, Mrs. Bucket returns home from her night job and explains to the rest of the family that Willy Wonka is holding a competition where five lucky contestants must buy Wonka Bars to find a Golden Ticket to his factory and a lifetime's supply of candy. Charlie is desperate to win one, but he has no money. On their homemade TV, they hear of the first Golden Ticket winner, an obese Bavarian boy named Augustus Gloop ("More of Him to Love").

They soon learn that another ticket has been found by a spoiled British girl named Veruca Salt. Mr. Salt, Veruca's father, recounts how he won the ticket for his daughter ("When Veruca Says"). Charlie's birthday arrives, and his grandparents give him a Wonka Bar, but are disappointed when there is no Golden Ticket. As he eats, they hear of the discovery of the third Golden Ticket, in Hollywood by wannabe gum-chewing celebrity, Violet Beauregarde. She and her father brag about how they will now be even more famous because of the Golden Ticket and how Violet is going to be the "biggest" diva ever ("The Double Bubble Duchess"). Shortly after, the TV announces another Golden Ticket discovery, Mike Teavee and the Teavee family. Mike is a violent and obnoxious bully who is addicted to television and video games, and whose frantic mother spoils him rotten and explains his hazardous activities and how he used Wonka's password to get his Golden Ticket. ("It's Teavee Time").

With all but one ticket gone and no money to buy a bar, Charlie is desolate. His parents sing about how they wish they could raise their son together and about how they hope for a better life ("If Your Mother Were Here"). Winter comes, and one day Charlie finds some money dropped by a rich couple. Encouraged by the mysterious tramp, he buys a Wonka Bar, and finds a Golden Ticket inside that prompts Grandpa Joe to get out of bed and walk for the first time in forty years ("Don't Ya Pinch Me, Charlie"). On the day they are to enter the factory, Charlie and Grandpa Joe feel out of place amidst all the hoopla on the red carpet. Finally, the moment of truth arrives. With a choral fanfare, the factory door swings open and all eyes turn to see the mysterious Willy Wonka, who invites the Golden Ticket winners into his factory to see all the wonders ("It Must Be Believed to Be Seen").

==== Act II ====
Wonka gathers the ticket winners and explains the rules and regulations of the factory ("Strike That! Reverse It!"). With the contracts signed, Wonka then welcomes them into the Chocolate Room. As the children explore, the parents ask Wonka what its purpose is and Wonka bemusedly explains that is his artwork ("Simply Second Nature"). Veruca breaks the reverie with a scream as Augustus is drinking from the Chocolate River when he falls into it and gets sucked up the chocolate extraction pipe. The families then look up to see dozens of tiny workers in red boiler suits called Oompa-Loompas, who make no effort to try and save Augustus ("Auf Wiedersehen Augustus Gloop").

With Augustus gone, Wonka is more concerned about the possible contamination of bones in his toffee. The party is shocked and mortified, but Wonka assures them that he'll be fine. The next room is the Inventing Room, where white-coated Oompa-Loompas mix and stir. Wonka gives each child an Everlasting Gobstopper, but Violet is unimpressed. Wonka shows her his latest creation, a three-course dinner in one stick of gum. When Violet sees the gum, she pops it into her mouth. Wonka warns her to stop chewing before dessert, but Violet ignores him and begins to turn purple and swell up into a giant blueberry. ("Juicy!"). Violet explodes in a shower of purple blueberry goo and glitter, but Wonka is unconcerned, sending Mr. Beauregarde to the Juicing Room, assuring that it can get her back to normal.

Wonka next leads the party on a high speed tour around the crazy corridors of his factory until, disoriented, they arrive at the Nut Room, where squirrels sort out nuts to see if they are good or bad. The good nuts are kept for them to eat while the bad nuts are thrown away down a rubbish chute. Veruca demands a squirrel. When Wonka refuses, she takes matters into her own hands, rushing to grab one for herself, instead she is judged a “bad nut”, and she and her father are sent down the rubbish chute ("Veruca's Nutcracker Sweet"). Again, Wonka assures the remaining visitors that Veruca and her father will be all right.

Wonka leads the group through dark cellars, where all his mistakes are kept, finally arriving at a room he calls, The Department of the Future. Wonka demonstrates Chocolate Television. Mike is intrigued and despite Wonka's protests, he puts himself before the cameras, presses the remote and disappears in a puff of smoke. Mike hops from screen to screen until they finally pull him out, leaving him at only 6-inches tall. ("Vidiots!"). Mrs. Teevee is relieved as she won't have to worry about him causing big problems any more, and she places him in her purse and leaves the factory quite satisfied.

Charlie is the only child left. When Grandpa Joe asks about their lifetime supply of confectionery sweets, Mr. Wonka casually dismisses them saying that the Everlasting Gobstopper Charlie had got was the lifetime supply of candy. Grandpa Joe is angry, but Charlie defuses the situation saying that an Everlasting Gobstopper is still an amazing present. When he leaves with Grandpa Joe, Charlie opens a book which contains all of Wonka's ideas, adding a few of his own to the blank pages in the back. Wonka silently returns, and seeing Charlie's additions, he tells him he's won, inviting Charlie into his Great Glass Elevator so that he can show him his prize, the chocolate factory. ("Pure Imagination").

They return to Earth where Wonka announces he's leaving, and that Charlie is now in charge ("A Little Me"). He disappears, but as the Bucket family moves into the factory, Charlie sees the mysterious tramp outside the gates, who is revealed as Wonka. As the Oompa-Loompas and Charlie wave goodbye from the factory windows, Wonka vanishes, singing a reprise of "It Must Be Believed to Be Seen", leaving Charlie to ponder all of the adventures that are to come.

=== Broadway ===
==== Act I ====
The play opens with Willy Wonka introducing himself, revealing that he's looking for an heir to run his legendary chocolate factory ("The Candy Man"). Wonka disguises himself as the storeowner of a local candy shop, which quickly attracts the attention of the town's residents and candy- obsessed Charlie Bucket. Despite having no money to spend on sweets, Charlie frequents the shop regularly and befriends the owner, unaware that he is Willy Wonka. Charlie tells him about Wonka's career ("Willy Wonka! Willy Wonka!") and remarks that he would do anything to see inside the factory, giving Wonka an idea. Charlie returns to the decrepit shack he lives in ("The Candy Man Reprise"), which he shares with his mother and four bed-ridden grandparents: Grandpa George, Grandma Georgina, Grandma Josephine, and Grandpa Joe.

Charlie and Grandpa Joe play a pretend game recalling how the latter became Wonka's security guard ("Charlie, You and I") before his mother comes home, giving Charlie an old notebook for homework. Charlie daydreams and scribbles a letter to Willy Wonka, suggesting new candies he should consider inventing, before folding it into a paper airplane and tossing it out the window into the night ("A Letter From Charlie Bucket"). The next day, before going to school, he finds out that Wonka has hidden five Golden Tickets inside five Wonka Bars and that the people who find the tickets will win a tour of the factory and a lifetime supply of candy.

Unfortunately, Charlie's mother admits that money is tighter than usual and she cannot afford to buy him his annual birthday candy bar, leaving Charlie saddened at the fact that he has no chance of winning the contest. Grandpa Joe says he would gladly pay for one using his funeral savings, and Charlie's mood improves. As he passes by the candy store on his way home from school, he discovers the first ticket has been found by the "Bavarian Beefcake" Augustus Gloop, an obese boy obsessed with food ("More of Him to Love").

Charlie is sad that a chance is gone, and his mood worsens when he is interrupted with news of the second Golden Ticket winner, a spoiled Russian girl named Veruca Salt ("When Veruca Says"). Charlie attempts to buy his usual secondhand vegetables from local beggar-woman Mrs. Green, but is dismayed to find she has taken to selling chocolate and he can no longer afford her prices. His dismay is magnified when the third ticket is found by gum-chewing, wannabe celebrity Violet Beauregarde ("Queen of Pop") and the fourth ticket is found by technology addict Mike Teavee, who admits he hacked into Wonka's computers and found the fourth ticket ("What Could Possibly Go Wrong"). With his hopes of winning dashed, Charlie heads back home.

Upon arriving home, Charlie is overjoyed to find that his family have pooled their money to buy his birthday chocolate, but is crushed once more when the candy yields no Golden Ticket. His mother and his other three grandparents remark that their lives would be better if Charlie's father were still alive ("If Your Father Were Here"). The next day, Charlie visits the candy store only to find that all the inventory has sold and that the owner (Wonka) is closing up shop. After he leaves, Charlie discovers a single dollar left behind under the cash register.

After attempting to return the dollar, Charlie runs into Mrs. Green once more and decides to buy a Wonka Bar instead of vegetables. As he opens the bar, he is elated to find the fifth Golden Ticket inside. He rushes home to share his good news with his family. Despite her happiness that Charlie has won, Mrs. Bucket is disappointed to learn that Charlie must be accompanied by an adult in order to go on the tour, as she is sure to lose her job if she asks for a day off of work.

Grandpa Joe, however, claims that Charlie's good fortune is his "Call to Arms," and he decides to get out of bed for the first time in years so he can take Charlie on the tour. After a few failed attempts to stand up, Grandpa Joe finally gets on his feet, and dances gleefully with Mrs. Bucket and Charlie ("Grandpa Joe/I've Got a Golden Ticket!"). The big day arrives, and the five winners are greeted at the factory gates by paparazzi and "Chocolate TV" reporters Cherry Sundae and Jerry Jubilee, making Charlie and Grandpa Joe feel out of place. Willy Wonka appears at last, and ushers the group into his factory ("It Must Be Believed to be Seen").

==== Act II ====
The five winners and their families check in with Wonka, where he explains the rules and regulations of his factory and has the parents sign a ridiculously long and complicated contract ("Strike That, Reverse It!"). Afterwards, the group enters the Chocolate Room, where everything is edible, and the children explore the candy-coated utopia ("Pure Imagination"). The adults, however, are less impressed by the world of candy, as they see it as an impractical use of money and resources, much to Wonka's dismay. Despite Wonka's warnings, Augustus takes a drink from a molten chocolate lagoon and falls in. He then meets a terrible demise as he is sucked up a chocolate pipe leading to the Fudge Room. Wonka's pint-sized workers, the Oompa Loompas, arrive and make no effort to rescue Augustus ("The Oompa Loompa Song/Auf Wiedersehen Augustus Gloop"). Wonka fails to console Augustus's distraught mother, as he is more concerned with having to pick bones out of his fudge. The group is stricken, but Wonka assures them Augustus will be fine and sends Mrs. Gloop with the Oompa Loompas to find her son.

They continue into the Mixing Room, where an enormous mixing cup mashes random ingredients together to make new flavors and inventions, from furry lollipops to a glowing orb made from bananas and uranium Charlie dubs "Liquid Sunshine." At Violet's request, he shows her a stick of gum, which contains a three-course meal. Violet and her father are overjoyed, as they believe the new product can catapult Violet into gum superstardom. Despite Wonka's warning that there is a problem with the dessert course and the gum is not yet safe to chew, Violet takes the gum and accidentally swallows it. The excess of juice in the gum causes her to swell up and turn into a human blueberry. Wonka sends Violet and her father to the Oompa Loompas for help, and is quickly distracted from the situation by Mrs. Teavee asking about the origin of the Oompa Loompas. Wonka and the Oompa Loompas recall the story of how they met ("When Willy Met Oompa"), not paying attention to Violet's growing size. Violet then explodes in a shower of purple goo onto her father after an Oompa Loompa shoots a blowdart at her. Wonka is unconcerned and sends Mr. Beauregarde to the Juicing Room, assuring him and the group that she will be fine.

Wonka decides that they should visit the ingredient storage corridors, but first they must traverse an invisible maze of deadly traps. The others are skeptical that the maze really exists, but change their minds when Mike Teavee gets beaten up by the invisible traps. The whole group passes through except for Grandpa Joe, who cannot bend down far enough to fit through the door. Undeterred, Wonka suggests changing course to go and see the Nut Room instead. Outside, they meet Jeremy, a worker squirrel who sorts the good nuts from the bad. Veruca is enamored by Jeremy, and demands that her father buy her a squirrel. When Wonka refuses to sell, Veruca throws a tantrum and runs into the Sorting Room to retrieve one herself, against Wonka's warnings that the squirrels are very dangerous. Inside, she chases and dances with the squirrels, but tries to run when they begin to get violent. She is seized by the squirrels and dubbed a "bad nut", and is promptly torn apart to the horror of her father and the rest of the group ("Veruca's Nutcracker Sweet"). Wonka assures them that the Oompa Loompas will be able to put her back together, and Mr. Salt leaves to rescue his daughter. Mrs. Teavee reprimands Wonka for his belief that the Oompa Loompas can really save all the children from their certain demise, but he dismisses her and presses onward.

Wonka and the Teavees board the S.S. Wonka, a bathtub-shaped boat, and travel through an underground river deep below the factory. Charlie and Grandpa Joe, who were too slow to catch the boat, are forced to swim behind them wearing scuba helmets. Wonka leads them into the TV room, much to Mike's delight. Wonka demonstrates Chocolate Television, which uses a machine to send chocolate bars to TV screens. Mike's obsession with electronics overcomes him and, despite his mother and Wonka's protests, he uses the machine to teleport himself into a television set. However, they cannot locate him on the usual channel, so Wonka calls for the Oompa Loompas to bring more screens to try to find him faster. Mike jumps from screen to screen until his mother pulls him out, now as a doll-sized boy ("Vidiots"). Mrs. Teavee is relieved that her son won't be able to cause trouble anymore, and leaves the factory satisfied with her son in her purse.

Charlie is the only one left. Wonka leads him and Grandpa Joe to the Imagining room, where Wonka writes his ideas into a notebook. When Grandpa Joe asks about their lifetime supply of candy, Wonka replies by giving Charlie a gobstopper. Grandpa Joe is furious with Wonka for giving his grandson a "measly Gobstopper," and the two quickly begin to fight. Charlie diffuses the situation, telling Grandpa Joe that the Gobstopper is a great present and that the trip to the factory was enough. Placated, Wonka ushers Grandpa Joe into his office to negotiate legal paperwork and warns Charlie not to touch anything. Charlie breaks the rules and opens the notebook, adding his own inventions to the blank pages in the back, only to be caught by Wonka. Although he seems angry at first, Wonka finds it incredible that Charlie is unable to stop inventing, even if it means breaking the rules. Wonka tells Charlie that he has won, and ushers him into his "Great Glass Elevator".

The two soar above town in the Great Glass Elevator, and Wonka tells Charlie that his grand prize is the chocolate factory ("The View From Here"). He reaches into his pocket and reveals that he received Charlie's letter after all, and wants to begin working on some of Charlie's inventions. As they land back outside the factory, Wonka is immediately ready to begin working but Charlie is concerned about what will happen to his family. Wonka explains that they have already been moved into their own room in the factory, and invites Charlie in to begin their new life as candy-making partners.

=== Music Theatre International (MTI Shows) ===
==== Act I ====
The play opens with Willy Wonka introducing himself, revealing that he's looking for an heir to run his legendary chocolate factory ("The Candy Man"). Wonka disguises himself as the storeowner of a local candy shop, which quickly attracts the attention of the town's residents and candy- obsessed Charlie Bucket. Despite having no money to spend on sweets, Charlie frequents the shop regularly and befriends the owner, unaware that he is Willy Wonka. Charlie tells him about Wonka's career ("Willy Wonka! Willy Wonka!") and remarks that he would do anything to see inside the factory, giving Wonka an idea. Charlie returns to the decrepit shack he lives in ("The Candy Man Reprise"), which he shares with his mother and four bed-ridden grandparents: Grandpa George, Grandma Georgina, Grandma Josephine, and Grandpa Joe.

Charlie and Grandpa Joe play a pretend game recalling how the latter became Wonka's security guard ("Charlie, You and I") before his mother comes home, giving Charlie an old notebook for homework. Charlie daydreams and scribbles a letter to Willy Wonka, suggesting new candies he should consider inventing, before folding it into a paper airplane and tossing it out the window into the night ("A Letter From Charlie Bucket"). The next day before he goes to school, he finds out that Wonka has hidden five Golden Tickets inside five Wonka Bars and that the people who find the tickets will win a tour of the factory and a lifetime supply of candy.

Unfortunately, Charlie's mother admits that money is tighter than usual and she cannot afford to buy him his annual birthday candy bar, leaving Charlie saddened at the fact that he has no chance of winning the contest. Grandpa Joe says he would gladly pay for one using his funeral savings, and Charlie's mood improves. As he passes by the candy store on his way home from school, he discovers the first ticket has been found by the "Bavarian Beefcake" Augustus Gloop, an obese boy obsessed with food ("More of Him to Love").

Charlie is sad that a chance is gone, and his mood worsens when he is interrupted with news of the second Golden Ticket winner, a spoiled Russian girl named Veruca Salt ("When Veruca Says"). Charlie attempts to buy his usual secondhand vegetables from local beggar-woman Mrs. Green, but is dismayed to find she has taken to selling chocolate and he can no longer afford her prices. His dismay is magnified when the third ticket is found by gum-chewing, wannabe celebrity Violet Beauregarde ("Queen of Pop") and the fourth ticket is found by technology addict Mike Teavee, who admits he hacked into Wonka's computers and found the fourth ticket ("This Little Man of Mine"). With his hopes of winning dashed, Charlie heads back home.

Upon arriving home, Charlie is overjoyed to find that his family have pooled their money to buy his birthday chocolate, but is crushed once more when the candy yields no Golden Ticket. His mother and his other three grandparents remark that their lives would be better if Charlie's father were still alive ("If Your Father Were Here"). The next day, Charlie visits the candy store only to find that all the inventory has sold and that the owner (Wonka) is closing up shop. After he leaves, Charlie discovers a single dollar left behind under the cash register.

After attempting to return the dollar, Charlie runs into Mrs. Green once more and decides to buy a Wonka Bar instead of vegetables. As he opens the bar, he is elated to find the fifth Golden Ticket inside. He rushes home to share his good news with his family. Despite her happiness that Charlie has won, Mrs. Bucket is disappointed to learn that Charlie must be accompanied by an adult in order to go on the tour, as she is sure to lose her job if she asks for a day off of work.

Grandpa Joe, however, claims that Charlie's good fortune is his "Call to Arms," and he decides to get out of bed for the first time in years so he can take Charlie on the tour. After a few failed attempts to stand up, Grandpa Joe finally gets on his feet, and dances gleefully with Mrs. Bucket and Charlie ("I've Got a Golden Ticket!/Grandpa Joe"). The big day arrives, and the five winners are greeted at the factory gates by paparazzi and "Chocolate TV" reporters Cherry Sundae and Jerry Jubilee, making Charlie and Grandpa Joe feel out of place. Willy Wonka appears at last, and ushers the group into his factory ("It Must Be Believed to be Seen").

==== Act II ====
The five winners and their families check in with Wonka, where he explains the rules and regulations of his factory and has the parents sign a ridiculously long and complicated contract ("Strike That, Reverse It!"). Afterwards, the group enters the Chocolate Room, where everything is edible, and the children explore the candy-coated utopia ("Pure Imagination"). The adults however, are less impressed by the world of candy, as they see it as an impractical use of money and resources, much to Wonka's dismay. Despite Wonka's warnings, Augustus takes a drink from a molten chocolate lagoon and falls in. He then meets a terrible demise as he is sucked up a chocolate pipe leading to the Fudge Room. Wonka's pint-sized workers, the Oompa Loompas, arrive and make no effort to rescue Augustus ("The Oompa Loompa Song/Auf Wiedersehen Augustus Gloop"). Wonka fails to console Augustus's distraught mother, as he is more concerned with having to pick bones out of his fudge. The group is stricken, but Wonka assures them Augustus will be fine and sends Mrs. Gloop with the Oompa Loompas to find her son.

They continue into the Mixing Room, where an enormous mixing cup mashes random ingredients together to make new flavors and inventions, from furry lollypops to a glowing orb made from bananas and uranium Charlie dubs "Liquid Sunshine." At Violet's request, he shows her a stick of gum, which contains a three-course meal. Violet and her father are overjoyed, as they believe the new product can catapult Violet into gum superstardom. Despite Wonka's warning that there is a problem with the dessert course and the gum is not yet safe to chew, Violet takes the gum and accidentally swallows it. The excess of juice in the gum causes her to swell up and turn into a human blueberry ("You Got Whatcha Want"). Violet then explodes in a shower of purple goo onto her father. Wonka is unconcerned and sends Mr. Beauregarde to the Juicing Room, assuring him and the group that she will be fine.

Wonka decides that they should visit the ingredient storage corridors, but first they must traverse an invisible maze of deadly traps. The others are skeptical that the maze really exists, but change their minds when Mike Teavee gets beaten up by the invisible traps. The whole group passes through except for Grandpa Joe, who cannot bend down far enough to fit through the door. Undeterred, Wonka suggests changing course to go and see the Nut Room instead. Outside they meet Jeremy, a worker squirrel who sorts the good nuts from the bad. Veruca is enamored by Jeremy, and demands that her father buy her a squirrel. When Wonka refuses to sell, Veruca throws a tantrum and runs into the Sorting Room to retrieve one herself, against Wonka's warnings that the squirrels are very dangerous. Inside, she chases and dances with the squirrels, but tries to run when they begin to get violent. She is seized by the squirrels and dubbed a "bad nut", and is promptly torn apart to the horror of her father and the rest of the group ("Veruca's Nutcracker Sweet"). Wonka assures them that the Oompa Loompas will be able to put her back together, and Mr. Salt leaves to rescue his daughter. Mrs. Teavee reprimands Wonka for his belief that the Oompa Loompas can really save all the children from their certain demise, but he dismisses her and presses onward.

Wonka and the Teavees board the S.S. Wonka, a bathtub-shaped boat, and travel through an underground river deep below the factory. Charlie and Grandpa Joe, who were too slow to catch the boat, are forced to swim behind them wearing scuba helmets. Wonka leads them into the TV room, much to Mike's delight. Wonka demonstrates Chocolate Television, which uses a machine to send chocolate bars to TV screens. Mike's obsession with electronics overcomes him and, despite his mother and Wonka's protests, he uses the machine to teleport himself into a television set. However, they cannot locate him on the usual channel, so Wonka calls for the Oompa Loompas to bring more screens to try to find him faster. Mike jumps from screen to screen until his mother pulls him out, now as a doll-sized boy ("Vidiots"). Mrs. Teavee is relieved that her son won't be able to cause trouble anymore, and leaves the factory satisfied with her son in her purse ("This Little Man of Mine (Reprise)").

Charlie is the only one left. Wonka leads him and Grandpa Joe to the Imagining room, where Wonka writes his ideas into a notebook. When Grandpa Joe asks about their lifetime supply of candy, Wonka replies by giving Charlie a gobstopper. Grandpa Joe is furious at Wonka giving his grandson a "measly Gobstopper," and the two quickly begin to fight. Charlie diffuses the situation, telling Grandpa Joe that the Gobstopper is a great present and that the trip to the factory was enough. Placated, Wonka ushers Grandpa Joe into his office to negotiate legal paperwork and warns Charlie not to touch anything. Charlie breaks the rules and opens the notebook, adding his own inventions to the blank pages in the back, only to be caught by Wonka. Although he seems angry at first, Wonka finds it incredible that Charlie is unable to stop inventing, even if it means breaking the rules. Wonka tells Charlie that he has won, and ushers him into his "Great Glass Elevator".

The two soar above town in the Great Glass Elevator, and Wonka tells Charlie that his grand prize is the chocolate factory ("The View From Here"). He reaches into his pocket and reveals that he received Charlie's letter after all, and wants to begin working on some of Charlie's inventions. As they land back outside the factory, Wonka is immediately ready to begin working but Charlie is concerned about what will happen to his family. Wonka explains that they have already been moved in to their own room in the factory, and invites Charlie in to begin their new life as candy-making partners.

== Musical numbers ==
=== London ===
Act I

- "Creation Overture" ††† - Willy Wonka
- "Almost Nearly Perfect" - Charlie Bucket
- "The Amazing Fantastical History of Mr. Willy Wonka" - Grandparents
- "A Letter from Charlie Bucket" - Charlie Bucket, Mr. Bucket, Mrs. Bucket, and Grandparents
- "More of Him to Love" - Mrs. Gloop, Augustus Gloop, and Mr. Gloop
- "When Veruca Says" - Mr. Salt and Veruca Salt
- "The Double Bubble Duchess" † - Mr. Beauregarde, Violet Beauregarde, and Ensemble
- "It's Teavee Time!" - Mrs. Teavee and Mike Teavee
- "If Your Mother Were Here" - Mr. Bucket and Mrs. Bucket
- "Don'cha Pinch Me, Charlie" - Charlie Bucket, Grandpa Joe, Grandparents, Mr. Bucket, and Mrs. Bucket
- "It Must Be Believed to Be Seen" - Willy Wonka

Act II

- "Strike That! Reverse It!" - Willy Wonka and Ensemble
- "Simply Second Nature" - Willy Wonka
- "Auf Wiedersehen Augustus Gloop" - Oompa-Loompas and Willy Wonka
- "Juicy!" - Oompa-Loompas and Willy Wonka
- "Veruca's Nutcracker Sweet" - Oompa-Loompas
- "Vidiots" - Oompa-Loompas, Willy Wonka and Mrs. Teavee
- "A Letter from Charlie Bucket" (Reprise) ††† - Charlie Bucket
- "Pure Imagination" †† - Willy Wonka and Charlie Bucket
- "A Little Me" - Willy Wonka, Charlie Bucket, Oompa-Loompas, Mr. Bucket, Mrs. Bucket, and Grandparents
- "It Must Be Believed to Be Seen" (Reprise) - Willy Wonka

† Replaced, as of 2016, by "The Queen of Pop".

†† Lyrics and Music by Leslie Bricusse and Anthony Newley for the 1971 film Willy Wonka & the Chocolate Factory.

††† Not included in the Original London Cast Recording

=== Broadway ===
Act I

- "Overture" - Orchestra
- "The Candy Man" † - Willy Wonka and Ensemble
- "Willy Wonka! Willy Wonka!" - Charlie Bucket and Ensemble
- "The Candy Man" (Reprise) † - Charlie Bucket
- "Charlie, You and I" - Grandpa Joe
- "A Letter from Charlie Bucket" - Charlie Bucket, Mrs. Bucket, and Grandparents
- "More of Him to Love" - Mrs. Gloop, Augustus Gloop, and Ensemble
- "When Veruca Says" - Mr. Salt and Veruca Salt
- "The Queen of Pop" - Mr. Beauregarde, Violet Beauregarde, and Ensemble
- "What Could Possibly Go Wrong?" - Mrs. Teavee, Mike Teavee, and Ensemble
- "If Your Father Were Here" - Mrs. Bucket
- "I've Got a Golden Ticket" † / "Grandpa Joe" - Charlie Bucket, Grandpa Joe, Grandparents, and Mrs. Bucket
- "It Must Be Believed to Be Seen" - Willy Wonka and Company

Act II

- "Strike That! Reverse It!" - Willy Wonka and Company
- "Pure Imagination" † / "Grandpa Joe" (Reprise) - Willy Wonka, Charlie Bucket, Grandpa Joe, and the Golden Ticket Winners
- "The Oompa Loompa Song" † - Oompa Loompas
- "Auf Wiedersehen Augustus Gloop" - Willy Wonka and the Oompa Loompas
- "When Willy Met Oompa" - Willy Wonka and the Oompa-Loompas
- "Veruca's Nutcracker Sweet" – The Squirrels
- "Vidiots" – Willy Wonka, Mrs. Teavee and the Oompa-Loompas
- "The View From Here" - Willy Wonka and Charlie

† Lyrics and Music by Leslie Bricusse and Anthony Newley for the 1971 film Willy Wonka & the Chocolate Factory.

=== US tour ===
Act I

- "Overture" - Orchestra
- "The Candy Man" - Willy Wonka †
- "Willy Wonka! Willy Wonka!" - Charlie Bucket and Ensemble
- "The Candy Man" (Reprise) † - Charlie Bucket
- "Charlie, You and I" - Grandpa Joe and Charlie Bucket
- "A Letter from Charlie Bucket" - Charlie Bucket
- "More of Him to Love" - Mrs Gloop, Augustus Gloop, Ensemble
- "When Veruca Says" - Mr Salt and Veruca Salt
- "The Queen of Pop" - Violet Beauregarde, Mr Beauregarde, Ensemble
- "That Little Man of Mine" †† - Mrs Teavee and Mike Teavee
- "If Your Father Were Here" - Mrs Bucket, Charlie Bucket
- "I've Got A Golden Ticket" † / "Grandpa Joe" - Charlie Bucket, Grandpa Joe, Grandparents, Mrs Bucket
- "It Must Be Believed To Be Seen" - Willy Wonka, Ensemble

Act II

- "Strike That, Reverse It!" - Willy Wonka, Company
- "Pure Imagination" † / "Grandpa Joe" (Reprise) - Willy Wonka, Charlie Bucket, Company
- "The Oompa-Loompa Song" † / "Auf Wiedersehen, Augustus Gloop" - Oompa-Loompas, Willy Wonka
- "When Willy Met Oompa" - Willy Wonka, Oompa-Loompas
- "Veruca's Nutcracker Sweet" - Oompa-Loompas, Bad Nut Squirrels
- "Vidiots" - Oompa-Loompas, Willy Wonka, Mrs Teavee
- "That Little Man of Mine" (Reprise) - Mrs Teavee
- "The View From Here" - Willy Wonka, Charlie Bucket

† Lyrics and Music by Leslie Bricusse and Anthony Newley for the 1971 film Willy Wonka & the Chocolate Factory.

†† Replacing "What Could Possibly Go Wrong?"

=== UK tour ===
Act I

- "Almost Nearly Perfect" - Charlie Bucket
- "Charlie, You and I" - Grandpa Joe
- "The Amazing Fantastical History of Mr. Willy Wonka" - Grandparents and Charlie Bucket
- "A Letter from Charlie Bucket" - Charlie Bucket, Mrs. Bucket, and Grandparents
- "More of Him to Love" - Mrs. Gloop, Augustus Gloop, and Mr. Gloop
- "When Veruca Says" - Mr. Salt and Veruca Salt
- "The Queen of Pop" - Mrs. Beauregarde, Violet Beauregarde, and Ensemble
- "Charlie, You and I" (Reprise) - Grandpa Joe
- "The Teavee Family" †† - Mrs. Teavee, Mike Teavee, and Ensemble
- "The Candy Man" † - Mrs. Bucket
- "Almost Nearly Perfect" (Reprise) - Charlie Bucket
- "Don'cha Pinch Me, Charlie" - Charlie Bucket, Grandpa Joe, Grandparents, Mrs. Bucket, and Ensemble
- "You Ain't Seen Nothing Yet" / "It Must Be Believed to Be Seen" - Willy Wonka and Ensemble

Act II

- "Strike That! Reverse It!" - Willy Wonka and Company
- "Pure Imagination" † - Willy Wonka, Charlie Bucket, Grandpa Joe, and the Golden Ticket Winners
- "Auf Wiedersehen Augustus Gloop" - Willy Wonka and the Oompa Loompas
- "You Got Whacha Want" ††† - Oompa-Loompas and Willy Wonka
- "Veruca's Nutcracker Sweet" - Oompa-Loompas
- "Vidiots" - Oompa-Loompas, Willy Wonka and Mrs. Teavee
- "A Letter from Charlie Bucket" (Reprise) - Charlie Bucket
- "The View From Here" - Willy Wonka and Charlie
- "The Candy Man" (Reprise) - Willy Wonka, Charlie Bucket, Mrs. Bucket, and Grandparents
- "Almost Nearly Perfect" (Reprise) - Willy Wonka

† Lyrics and Music by Leslie Bricusse and Anthony Newley for the 1971 film Willy Wonka & the Chocolate Factory.

†† “The Teavee Family” is the same song as “It's Teavee Time!" from the original West End production with a different title.

††† Replacing "When Willy Met Oompa"

=== Music Theatre International (MTI) ===
Act I

- "Overture" - Orchestra
- "The Candy Man" † - Willy Wonka, Ensemble
- "Willy Wonka! Willy Wonka!" - Charlie Bucket, Ensemble
- "The Candy Man (Reprise)" † - Charlie Bucket
- "Charlie, You & I" - Grandpa Joe, Charlie Bucket
- "A Letter From Charlie Bucket" - Charlie Bucket, Mrs. Bucket, Grandparents
- "More Of Him To Love" - Mrs. Gloop, Augustus Gloop, Ensemble
- "When Veruca Says" - Mr. Salt, Veruca Salt
- "The Queen Of Pop" - Mr. Beauregarde, Violet Beauregarde, Gum Chompin' Divas
- "That Little Man Of Mine" †† - Mrs. Teavee, Mike Teavee
- "If Your Father Were Here" - Mrs. Bucket, Grandparents
- "I've Got A Golden Ticket" † - Charlie Bucket, Grandpa Joe, Mrs. Bucket, Grandparents
- "It Must Be Believed To Be Seen" - Willy Wonka, Golden Ticket Winners, Ensemble

Act II

- "Strike That, Reverse It" - Willy Wonka, Golden Ticket Winners
- "Pure Imagination" † - Willy Wonka, Charlie Bucket, Golden Ticket Winners
- "Auf Wiedersehen Augustus Gloop" - Oompa Loompas, Willy Wonka, Mrs. Gloop
- "You Got Whacha Want” ††† - Oompa Loompas, Willy Wonka
- "Veruca's Nutcracker Sweet" - Oompa Loompas, Veruca Salt, Mr. Salt
- "Vidiots" - Oompa Loompas, Willy Wonka, Mrs. Teavee
- "That Little Man Of Mine (Reprise)" - Mrs. Teavee
- "The View From Here" - Willy Wonka, Charlie Bucket

† Lyrics and Music by Leslie Bricusse and Anthony Newley for the 1971 film Willy Wonka & the Chocolate Factory.

†† Replacing "What Could Possibly Go Wrong?”

††† Replacing “When Willy Met Oompa”

=== Cast albums ===
==== Original London cast recording ====
A London original cast album was released on 7 October 2013.

Charlie and the Chocolate Factory the Musical

Soundtrack album cast recording by Various
- Released: 7 October 2013
- Length: 69:08
- Label: Sony Classical Records

No.	Title	Length
1.	"Opening"	0:46
2.	"Almost Nearly Perfect"	2:57
3.	"The Amazing Fantastical History Of Mr. Willy Wonka"	5:23
4.	"A Letter From Charlie Bucket"	3:33
5.	"News Of Augustus"	1:03
6.	"More Of Him To Love"	2:12
7.	"News Of Veruca"	0:36
8.	"When Veruca Says"	1:34
9.	"News Of Violet"	0:26
10.	"The Double Bubble Duchess"	2:48
11.	"News Of Mike"	0:09
12.	"It's Teavee Time"	3:27
13.	"If Your Mother Were Here"	3:41
14.	"Don'cha Pinch Me Charlie"	6:04
15.	"It Must Be Believed To Be Seen"	4:35
16.	"Strike That, Reverse It"	5:30
17.	"The Chocolate Room"	1:32
18.	"Simply Second Nature"	3:24
19.	"Augustus' Downfall"	0:38
20.	"Auf Wiedersehen Augustus Gloop"	2:34
21.	"Gum!"	0:53
22.	"Juicy!"	2:20
23.	"Veruca's Nutcracker Sweet"	2:15
24.	"Vidiots"	3:02
25.	"Pure Imagination"	3:40
26.	"A Little Me"	2:40
27.	"It Must Be Believed To Be Seen (Reprise)"	2:06

==== Original Broadway cast recording ====
A Broadway cast recording was released digitally on 2 June and in stores on 23 June on the Masterworks Broadway label.

Charlie and the Chocolate Factory the Musical

Soundtrack album cast recording by Various
- Released: 2 June 2017 (Digital) 23 June 2017 (CD)
- Length: 57:00
- Label: Masterworks Broadway

No.	Title	Length
1.	"Overture"	0:26
2.	"The Candy Man"	3:11
3.	"Willy Wonka! Willy Wonka!"	2:47
4.	"Charlie, You And I"	1:34
5.	"A Letter From Charlie Bucket"	3:23
6.	"More Of Him To Love"	2:07
7.	"When Veruca Says"	1:43
8.	"Queen of Pop"	2:34
9.	"What Could Possibly Go Wrong?"	2:15
10.	"If Your Father Were Here"	2:49
11.	"I've Got A Golden Ticket/Grandpa Joe"	4:13
12.	"It Must Be Believed To Be Seen"	4:24
13.	"Strike That, Reverse It"	5:32
14.	"Pure Imagination/Grandpa Joe (reprise)"	3:30
15.	"The Oompa Loompa Song/Auf Wiedersehen Augustus Gloop"	2:18
16.	"When Willy Met Oompa"	3:55
17.	"Veruca's Nutcracker Sweet"	1:36
18.	"Vidiots"	2:42
19.	"The View From Here"	6:03

== Orchestrations ==
The West End production had a 16 piece orchestra + conductor, which was orchestrated by Doug Besterman. The Broadway production had a 17 piece orchestra + conductor, which was also orchestrated by Besterman and with additional orchestrations by Michael Starobin.

	West End	Broadway
	Conductor	Conductor
Rhythm Section	Keyboard 1 Keyboard 2 Keyboard 3 Drums Percussion Bass (String and Electric) Guitars	Keyboard 1 Keyboard 2 Keyboard 3 Drums Percussion Bass (String and Electric) Guitars
Reeds	Reed 1: Flute/Piccolo/Alto Sax/Clarinet Reed 2: Tenor Sax/Clarinet/Soprano Sax/Flute Reed 3: Baritone Sax/Bassoon/Clarinet/Bass Clarinet	Reed 1: Flute/Piccolo/Alto Sax/Clarinet Reed 2: Oboe/English Horn Reed 3: Tenor Sax/Clarinet/Soprano Sax/Flute Reed 4: Baritone Sax/Bassoon/Clarinet/Bass Clarinet
Brass	Trumpet/Piccolo Trumpet/Flugelhorn Trombone French Horn	Trumpet/Piccolo Trumpet/Flugelhorn Trombone French Horn
Strings	Violin 1/Concertmaster Violin 2 Cello	Violin 1/Concertmaster Violin 2 Cello

== Principal roles and cast members ==
Character	West End	Broadway	1st US tour	2nd US tour	UK tour	West End
Character	2013	2017	2018	2020	2022	2027
Willy Wonka	Douglas Hodge	Christian Borle	Noah Weisberg	Cody Garcia	Gareth Snook	Michael Ball
Charlie Bucket	Jack Costello; Tom Klenerman; Isaac Rouse; Louis Suc	Jake Ryan Flynn; Ryan Foust; Ryan Sell	Henry Boshart; Collin Jeffrey; Rueby Wood	Brody Bett; Ryan Umbarila	Amelia Minto; Kayleen Nguema; Isaac Sugden; Noah Walton	TBC
Grandpa Joe	Nigel Planer	John Rubinstein	James Young	Steve McCoy	Michael D'Cruze	TBC
Mrs. Bucket	Alex Clatworthy	Emily Padgett	Amanda Rose	Caitlin Lester-Sams	Leonie Spilsbury	TBC
Mrs. Gloop	Jasna Ivir	Kathy Fitzgerald	Kathy Fitzgerald	Audrey Belle Adams	Kate Milner-Evans	TBC
Mr. Salt	Clive Carter	Ben Crawford	Nathaniel Hackmann	Scott Fuss	Christopher Howell	TBC
Mr./Mrs. Beauregarde	Paul J. Medford	Alan H. Green	David Samuel	Branden R. Mangan	Julie Mullins (Note: The character of Mr. Beauregarde was changed to Mrs. Beauregarde in the first UK and Ireland tour.)	TBC
Mrs. Teavee	Iris Roberts	Jackie Hoffman	Madeleine Doherty	Katie Fay Francis	Leonie Spilsbury	TBC
Augustus Gloop	Harrison Slater; Jenson Steele; Regan Stokes	F. Michael Haynie	Matt Wood	Sam St. Jean	Robin Simões da Silva	TBC
Veruca Salt	Polly Allen; Tia Noakes; Ellie Simons	Emma Sofia	Jessica Cohen	Angela Palladini	Kazmin Borrer	TBC
Violet Beauregarde	India Ria Amarteifio; Adrianna Bertola; Jade Johnson; Mya Olaye	Trista Dollison	Brynn Williams	Zakiya Baptiste	Marisha Morgan	TBC
Mike Teavee	Jay Heyman; Adam Mitchell; Luca Toomey	Michael Wartella	Daniel Quadrino	Matthew Boyd Snyder	Teddy Hinde	TBC
Grandma Josephine	Roni Page	Kristy Cates	Jennifer Jill Malenke	Jenna Brooke Scannelli	Kate Milner-Evans	TBC
Grandpa George	Billy Boyle	Paul Slade Smith	Benjamin Howes	Ryan Kiernan	Christopher Howell	TBC
Grandma Georgina	Myra Sands	Madeleine Doherty	Claire Neumann	Nicole Zelka	Julie Mullins	TBC
Mr. Bucket	Jack Shalloo	Ryan Breslin	David Paul Kidder	Daniel Pahl	—N/a	TBC
Mrs. Green	Michelle Bishop	Kyle Taylor Parker	Clyde Voce	Domanick Anton Hubbard	Victoria Nicol	TBC
Jerry	Ross Dawes	Jared Bradshaw	Joel Newsome	Justin White	Ewan Gillies	TBC
Cherry	Kate Graham	Stephanie Gibson	Sarah Bowden	Nicole Hale	Lucy Hutchison	TBC

=== Notable West End replacements ===
- Willy Wonka - Alex Jennings, Jonathan Slinger
- Grandpa Joe - Barry James, Kraig Thornber, Billy Boyle
- Mrs. Teavee - Josefina Gabrielle
- Mr. Bucket - Richard Dempsey

== Critical reception ==
=== West End ===
The West End production of Charlie and the Chocolate Factory received mixed to positive reviews from critics. While the physical production and quality of the performances were generally praised, the score and storytelling received criticism.

=== Broadway ===
The Broadway production received mixed to negative reviews from critics. Despite the enormous overhaul to both the book and score from the London production, critics noted that the storytelling was still choppy and relied too heavily on humor. Criticism was also drawn to the decision to cast adults as the Golden Ticket winners instead of children, as well as the lackluster sets redesigned for Broadway. However, Christian Borle received widespread praise for his performance as Willy Wonka, even amongst negativity towards other aspects of the show.

=== Australian tour ===
Like the Broadway production, the Australian tour received mixed to negative reviews, as critics compared it unfavorably with the recent musical production of another Roald Dahl children's story, Matilda. Critic Tim Byrne found the original music "bland and unremarkable" likewise the sets and costumes, but praised the performances of Paul Slade Smith and Tony Sheldon, and the "ingenious" puppetry of the Oompa Loompas. Critic Cameron Woodhead didn't mind the sets and costumes but said deep structural issues remained leaving "a show that's too focused on showing off to remember the importance of the simple things".

== Awards and nominations ==
=== London production ===
Year	Award	Category	Nominee	Result	Ref
2013	Evening Standard Award	Best Night Out		Nominated	
2014	Laurence Olivier Award	Best New Musical		Nominated	
2014	Laurence Olivier Award	Best Actor in a Musical	Douglas Hodge	Nominated	
2014	Laurence Olivier Award	Best Performance in a Supporting Role in a Musical	Nigel Planer	Nominated	
2014	Laurence Olivier Award	Best Set Design	Mark Thompson	Nominated	
2014	Laurence Olivier Award	Best Costume Design	Mark Thompson	Won	
2014	Laurence Olivier Award	Best Lighting Design	Paul Pyant	Won	
2014	Laurence Olivier Award	Best Theatre Choreographer	Peter Darling	Nominated	

=== Broadway production ===
Year	Award	Category	Nominee	Result	Ref
2017	Chita Rivera Award	Outstanding Choreography in a Broadway Show	Josh Bergasse	Nominated	
2017	Chita Rivera Award	Outstanding Female Dancer in a Broadway Show	Emma Pfaeffle	Nominated	
2017	Drama Desk Award	Outstanding Puppet Design	Basil Twist	Won	
2017	Drama League Award	Distinguished Performance Award	Christian Borle	Nominated	

=== Australian production ===
Year	Award	Category	Nominee	Result	Ref
2019	Helpmann Awards	Best Musical		Nominated	
2019	Helpmann Awards	Best Direction of a Musical	Jack O'Brien	Nominated	
2019	Helpmann Awards	Best Choreography in a Musical	Joshua Bergasse	Nominated	
2019	Helpmann Awards	Best Male Actor in a Musical	Paul Slade Smith	Nominated	
2019	Helpmann Awards	Best Female Actor in a Supporting Role in a Musical	Lucy Maunder	Nominated	
2019	Helpmann Awards	Best Male Actor in a Supporting Role in a Musical	Tony Sheldon	Won	
