= Josh Young =

American actor (born 1980)

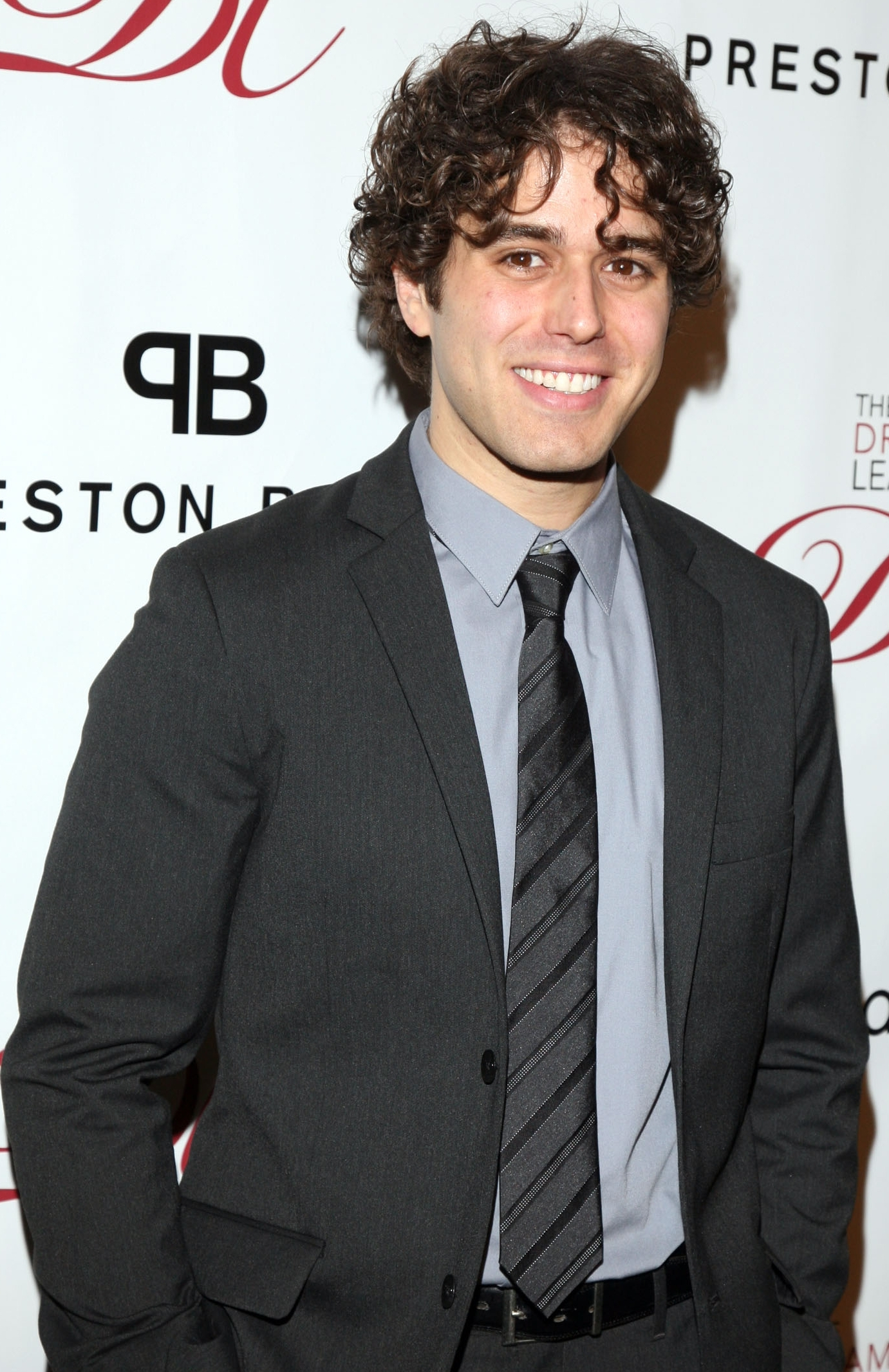
- Young at the 2012 Drama League Benefit Gala
- Born: Joshua Paul Young; May 10, 1980 (age 46); Wallingford, Pennsylvania, U.S.
- Education: Syracuse University
- Occupations: Actor, singer, educator
- Known for: Jesus Christ Superstar; Amazing Grace; Evita
- Spouse: Emily Padgett (m. 2018)
- Children: 2

Josh Young is an American actor best known for appearing on Broadway in the revival of Jesus Christ Superstar as Judas and Amazing Grace, originating the role of John Newton.

== Early life and education ==
Young was raised in a Conservative Jewish family in Wallingford, Pennsylvania. He trained at the Pennsylvania Governors School for the Arts and holds a B.F.A. in Musical Theatre from Syracuse University.

== Career ==
In 2003, Young played Marius in the US national tour of Les Misérables. Afterwards, he starred as Tony in the European and Asian tour of West Side Story.

From 2011 to 2012, Young played Judas in the Broadway revival of Jesus Christ Superstar, for which he was nominated for the Tony Award for Best Featured Actor in a Musical and won the 2012 Theatre World Award for outstanding Broadway debut performance.

In late 2012, he reprised his role of Che in Evita for the United States revival tour.

In March 2013, Young performed "Bring On the Men" from the Broadway musical Jekyll & Hyde at Broadway Cares/Equity Fights AIDS fundraising concert Broadway Backwards. In the summer of that same year he played Lt. Cable in The Muny production of South Pacific.

In 2015, he created the role of John Newton in the musical Amazing Grace on Broadway; the cast recording was released in February 2016. He won a Broadway World Award for this role in the Chicago Premiere at Bank of America Theatre.

Young appeared as Dr. Neville Craven in the 2016 and 2017 Shakespeare Theatre Company, 5th Avenue Theatre and Hobby Center for the Performing Arts productions of The Secret Garden. He was also in the 25th anniversary concert of The Secret Garden at the Lincoln Center in early 2016, appearing as Captain Albert Lennox.

He performed in several shows in the Stratford Festival, including The Grapes of Wrath (Connie), Evita (Che), and Kiss Me Kate (Paul). For his role as Che in Evita, he won the Broadway World Toronto Award for Best Actor in a Musical.

Young joined the faculty of Oakland University in 2019, and the faculty of Missouri State University in 2023.

In June 2022, he co-starred with Emily Padgett in Sunday in the Park with George at Shea's 710 Theatre, playing the title role. In August and September 2026, he’s set to star as Jean Valjean in Les Misérables at the Hudson Valley Shakespeare.

== Personal life ==
On January 12, 2017, Young got engaged to actress Emily Padgett; they were married on June 3, 2018. The couple welcomed their first child, a daughter, in February 2019, and a son in November 2020.

== Discography ==
- Amazing Grace: The Musical: Original Broadway Cast Recording
- Where the Sky Ends: The Songs of Michael Mott (Track: "Her Embrace" from Faustus)
- Still Dreaming of Paradise (solo album)
- Josh Young (self titled debut album)
