= Kenton Hall =

Canadian-British actor, director, writer and musician

- Born: September 1, 1976 (age 50); Estevan, Saskatchewan, Canada
- Occupations: Actor; film director; screenwriter; musician; author
- Years active: 2000s–present
- Known for: A Dozen Summers, frontman of ist
- Height: 5 ft 10 in (1.78 m)
- Children: 2

Kenton Johnathon Hall (born September 1, 1976) is a Canadian-born British actor, filmmaker, writer, and musician. He fronted the Leicester-based indie rock band ist from 2001 to 2010, directed and starred in the 2015 independent film A Dozen Summers, and wrote the 2019 memoir Bisection.

== Early life ==
Hall was born in Estevan, Saskatchewan, Canada, and raised in a strict religious group. At age 19, he moved to the United Kingdom.

== Career ==
=== Film and acting ===
Hall started his career in mid-1990s, making an uncredited appearance in the 1994 film adaptation of "Little Women". He returned to filmmaking in the late 2000s after focusing on music.

Since his return, Hall had worked on various independent short films, including "Bus Stop, Wet Day" (writer, director), "Twinkle, Twinkle", "The Edge of the Lawn" and "John Lennon's Turd". As an actor, Hall played the leading role in Clare Speller's film "Father to Fall", which he also co-produced and wrote. He also appeared in minor roles in feature films including Les Misérables and Muppets Most Wanted (2014), as well as short films for Seven/Five Productions.

In 2015, Hall wrote, directed, and co-starred in the independent comedy film A Dozen Summers. The film was made on a budget of £20,000. It premiered at Phoenix Comicon and was later distributed on streaming platforms, including Netflix and Apple TV. It received awards for Best Screenplay and Best Actress at the Torremolinos Fantastic Film Festival.

=== Music ===
From 2001 to 2010, Hall was the vocalist, guitarist, and primary songwriter for the Leicester-based indie rock band ist. Beginning with the 2001 EP The Adult Tree, the band released three studio albums: Freudian Corduroy (2004), King Martha (2005), and Toothpick Bridge (2008/2009 on Monkey Basket Records).

After a long hiatus from music, Hall launched the solo project Kenton Hall & The Necessary Measures. On January 31st, 2023, he released the triple album Idiopath alongside a cover album, Omniopath, where his songs were covered by other artists (including The Swinging Laurels, Steve Nieve, Colin Baker, Kevin Hewick, etc.). The project also included Videopath. After issuing the single "Towards the Light" in June 2025, he released the 12-track studio album Songs for the Swung on April 30, 2026, which received positive reviews from independent outlets including The Indie Grid (81%), Mystic Sons, Skylight Webzine, and FVMusicBlog.. In October 2026, he announced the mini-album Explanatory Notes, pre-orders of which also became a part of a campaign for the upcoming album, Saskatchewan.

=== Writing and audio drama ===
In 2019, Hall published Bisection: A More or Less Accurate Account of Bipolar Parenting and Twin Wrangling, a comedic memoir about raising children while managing bipolar disorder. The book was released by Spiteful Puppet and Chinbeard Books.

He co-wrote the 10-part historical drama Getting Better: The Fight for the NHS (2021) for Audible, starring Rhod Gilbert and Mark Gatiss, which received positive reviews in The Observer. He has also written official Doctor Who audio spin-offs, including the audio musical Children of the Circus (2023) for AUK Studios starring Sylvester McCoy and Sophie Aldred.

He also worked on the Sir Sherlock audio drama series by AUK Studios starring Tom Baker and John Leeson, making the script and official novella adaptation for The Sickle and the Sea.

== Personal life ==
Hall has spoken openly about living with bipolar disorder. He was first diagnosed after a suicide attempt at age 16, but started medical treatment in adulthood. He is openly bisexual and atheist. He also has twin daughters, Scarlet and Hero Hall, starred alongside him in A Dozen Summers. and provided the backing vocals on some songs in Hall's solo project, Kenton Hall & The Necessary Measures.

== Filmography ==
=== Film ===
Year	Title	Role	Notes
2012	Les Misérables	Ensemble	Uncredited
2013	The Amityville Asylum	Pemberton	
2014	Muppets Most Wanted	Russian Gulag Prisoner	Uncredited
2014	The Theory of Everything	Young Professor	Uncredited
2015	A Dozen Summers	Henry McCormack	Also director, writer, and producer
2015	The Honourable Rebel	Roland de Margerie	

=== Audio and podcasts ===
Year	Title	Role	Notes
2021	Getting Better: The Fight for the NHS	Miner	Audible Original; also co-writer
2023	London After Midnight	Hibbs	Audio drama; also writer and director
2023–2026	Twilight Meridian	Aidan / Police Sergeant	Audio series; also writer and director
2026	Sir Sherlock: The Sickle and the Sea	Writer	Audio drama and official novella adaptation

== Discography ==
=== with ist ===
==== Studio albums ====
Year	Title	Label	Notes
2002	Freudian Corduroy	Pink Box Records	First released on CD in 2002; released on streaming platforms in 2004. Extended edition released in 2010
2005	King Martha	Pink Box Records	Extended edition released in 2010
2009	Toothpick Bridge	Self-released	Extended edition released in 2014

==== EPs and singles ====
Year	Title	Label	Format
2001	The Adult Tree E.P.	Pink Box Records	12" EP
2002	The Corduroy Sessions	Pink Box Records	Promo CD
2004	Similarly Inclined	Pink Box Records	7" single
2006	The Wreck Of The Eddie Fitzpatrick / I Am Jesus [And You're Not]	Pink Box Records	Single
2009	Pep Talk	Monkey Basket Records	Promo CD
2014	Boyfriend	Punk Fox	7" single

=== Kenton Hall & The Necessary Measures ===
Year	Title	Type	Notes
2023	Idiopath	Studio album	Triple album (3LP)
2023	Omniopath	Companion album	Cover versions by 36 guest artists
2023	That's More Like It	Studio release / Single	Single, released alongside with Idiopath and Omniopath
2024	The Sun Shone Down / Good At What I Do	Single	Double single
2025	Towards the Light	Studio release	
2026	Songs for the Swung	Studio album	Released April 30, 2026
2026	Explanatory Notes	EP	Scheduled for November 30, 2026

== Bibliography ==
- Bisection: A More or Less Accurate Account of Bipolar Parenting and Twin Wrangling (2019, Spiteful Puppet / Chinbeard Books)
- Regenerations (editor and contributor, 2020, Chinbeard Books)
- Children of the Circus (with Stephen Wyatt, 2023, Oak Tree Books / Chinbeard Books)
- The Goodies: Pods and Monsters (with Robin Ince, 2023)
- Sherlock Holmes: The Woman Who Wasn't (editor, with Paul Birch and Kara Dennison, 2024, Andrews UK)
- The Astonishers series (with Jack Bowman, 2026): Case I – The Pilot Problem, Case II – The Twin Dilemmas, Case III – Riding the Rails
- Sir Sherlock: The Sickle and the Sea (2026, Chinbeard Books)
- Sir Sherlock: The Parting Shot (novelisation, with Gary Hopkins, 2026, Chinbeard Books)
