= Amazing Grace (musical) =

Musical with music and lyrics by Christopher Smith

- Playbill from the Broadway production
- Music: Christopher Smith
- Lyrics: Christopher Smith
- Book: Christopher Smith; Arthur Giron
- Productions: 2012 Chester, CT; 2014 Chicago; 2015 Broadway; 2018, 2019 Washington, DC

Amazing Grace is a musical with music and lyrics by Christopher Smith and a book by Smith and Arthur Giron. The musical is Smith's first foray as a professional writer or composer. It is based loosely on the life of John Newton, an English slave trader who later became an Anglican priest and eventually an abolitionist. He wrote many hymns, including "Amazing Grace".

The musical had a 2012 production by Goodspeed Musicals in Connecticut and a pre-Broadway run in Chicago in 2014. It opened on Broadway on July 16, 2015, and closed on October 25, 2015.

== Synopsis ==
Act I

It is nearly Christmas, 1742, and young Englishman John Newton returns from the sea ("Prologue"). His childhood friend, Mary Catlett, an aspiring singer, is angry that John abandoned his musical education to seek adventure at sea. John's father, Captain Newton, a wealthy slave-trader arrives; he is angry that his son has rejected his plans for him ("Truly Alive"). John and his friend Haweis begin the day's auction without the Captain. The cargo is African slaves ("The Auction"). A commotion ensues when a slave is freed by a group of hooded abolitionists; Mary gives up her cloak to conceal the young woman and aid her escape. John is humiliated and is tasked by Major Gray to find and retrieve the slave. John argues with Mary; he still suffers from the loss of his dear mother at age eight. Mary encourages John's better nature, singing a song he wrote for her years ago ("Someone Who Hears"). Mary is secretly invited to join an abolitionist group. She talks with her black maidservant, Nanna, about how Nanna became a slave and lost her daughter ("Yema's Song"). Mary's mother encourages her to pursue a relationship with the handsome and aristocratic Major Gray, who is interested in Mary. Mary, John and Gray all attend a Christmas ball where Mary performs a song that John wrote ("Voices of the Angels"). John drinks too much and offends everyone, including his father and Mary. Redcoat soldiers drag in two badly beaten abolitionists and the pregnant slave, also beaten. Major Gray scornfully points out that his soldiers, rather than John and his civil authorities, retrieved the slave. Gray leaves with Mary.

The next day, Mary meets with the abolitionists; they relate plans to undermine the slave trade ("We Are Determined"). She agrees to begin a relationship with Major Gray to act as their spy. Meanwhile, John is press-ganged into the Navy aboard the H.M.S. Harwich; When his father refuses to help him, and John breaks all ties with him ("Never"). Thomas, the Newton's house slave, attempts to intercede on John's behalf, and Captain Newton sends him on the ship as well. Mary struggles with her feelings for John ("Shadows of Innocence"). At her home, Major Gray proposes to Mary. As a cousin of George II, he must introduce Mary to the King to obtain royal consent to the marriage ("Expectations"). John's carelessness allows a French warship to defeat the Harwich, whose crew is killed. John falls into the sea, and Thomas dives in to save his master ("Battle at Sea").

Act II

John and Thomas are captured In Sierra Leone, by African warriors and their Princess Peyai, a ruthless slave trader, who threatens to kill John. John defies her ("Welcome Song") and is chained to a post and saved from starvation by a young slave girl, Yema. Meanwhile, Mary performs with the town choir ("Sing on High") and learns from Captain Newton that the Harwich has been lost ("Tell Me Why"). Peyai sends a letter to Captain Newton demanding ransom. Captain Newton prepares to sail to Sierra Leone ("A Chance for Me"), and Mary asks him to give John a letter. John uses his knowledge of the slave business to help Peyai to break up African families and assign slaves to ships. The Princess tests John's loyalty, pressuring him to sell Thomas as a slave bound for Barbados. As he is chained, Thomas confronts John about his choices ("Nowhere Left to Run"). Back in England, Major Gray learns that Mary plans to speak against slavery in front of Prince Frederick at the Christmas concert at court, where she has been asked to perform. He imprisons Nanna and threatens to harm her if Mary does anything foolish, but Nanna tells Mary to speak regardless of the Consequences ("Daybreak"). Captain Newton reaches Africa to pay the ransom for John, but a gunfight erupts; Peyai is killed, while Captain Newton is gravely wounded and soon dies aboard ship.

John assumes the role of Captain and finds Mary's letter inside his father's coat ("I Still Believe"). That night, John survives a fierce storm, remaining all night alone on deck, confronted by visions of the many lives he has destroyed ("Testimony"). He has an epiphany and turns the ship towards Barbados. He eventually finds and frees Thomas (whose African name is Pakuteh). John tells Pakuteh that he will spend his life working against the slave trade. Pakuteh is reluctant to forgive John ("I Will Remember") but relents and goes with him to England. John arrives home; Mary delivers an impassioned plea to Prince Frederick to end the barbarity of slavery. John bolsters her argument, vowing to undo his former evil. The Prince humiliates and demotes Gray. John and Mary reunite ("Nothing There to Love"). Pakuteh (Thomas), now a free man, recounts that John and Mary wed, and John went on to write hundreds of hymns ("Amazing Grace").

== Production history ==
=== Tryouts ===
Amazing Grace was first presented after a number of readings in a developmental production at Goodspeed Musicals in Chester, Connecticut in the summer of 2012. The production was directed by Gabriel Barre and starred Chris Peluso and Whitney Bashor.

The musical had a pre-Broadway run in the fall of 2014 at the Bank of America Theatre in Chicago, Illinois. The show was again directed by Barre and featured choreography by Christopher Gattelli. This production starred Josh Young as John, alongside Erin Mackey as Mary, Tom Hewitt as Captain Newton, Chuck Cooper as Pakuteh/Thomas, and Stanley Bahorek as Robert Haweis.

=== Broadway, 2015 ===
Amazing Grace opened on Broadway on July 16, 2015 at the Nederlander Theatre after 20 preview performances. The production featured the same principal cast and creative team as the Chicago production. It received mixed reviews. The show closed on October 25, 2015 after 116 performances. A cast recording was released in February 2016.

== Cast ==
=== Original Broadway cast ===
- Mary Catlett – Erin Mackey
- John Newton – Josh Young
- Robert Haweis – Stanley Bahorek
- Pakuteh (Thomas) – Chuck Cooper
- Yema – Rachael Ferrera
- Princess Peyai of the Sherbro people – Harriett D. Foy
- Captain Newton – Tom Hewitt
- Major Gray – Chris Hoch
- Nanna – Laiona Michelle
- Mrs. Catlett – Elizabeth Ward Land
- Mr. Tyler – Mike Evariste
- Rabbi Einhorn/Prince Frederick of Wales – Michael Dean Morgan
- Mr. Quigley – Vince Oddo
- Briggs – Gavriel Savit
- Mr. Whitley - Allen Kendall

== Songs ==
From the 2015 Broadway production

Act I

- "Prologue" – Pakuteh
- "Truly Alive" – John Newton and Captain Newton
- "The Auction" – John
- "Someone Who Hears" – Mary Catlett and John
- "Yema's Song" – Yema, Nanna and Ensemble
- "Voices of the Angels" – Mary
- "Rule, Britannia!" – Mary and Company
- "We are Determined" – Mr. Tyler, Mr. Einhorn, Mr. Quigley and Company
- "Each and Every Life" – Thomas
- "No Negotiation" – Briggs and Sailors
- "Never" – John
- "Shadows of Innocence" – John, Mary and Ensemble
- "Expectations" – Major Gray

Act II

- "Welcome Song" – Princess Peyai and Ensemble
- "Sing on High" – Company
- "Tell me Why" – Mary
- "Yema's Song" (reprise) – Yema
- "A Chance for Me" – Captain Newton
- "Nowhere Left to Run" – Thomas
- "Daybreak" – Nanna
- "I Still Believe" – Mary
- "Testimony" – John
- "I Will Remember" – John
- "Rule, Britannia!" (reprise) – Mary
- "Nothing There to Love" – John and Mary
- "Amazing Grace" – Company
