= Fight the Bear =

- Origin: Bishop's Castle, Shropshire, England
- Genres: Ska; rock
- Labels: Sticky Fixer
- Members: Jonny Keeley; Jamie Furber; Ben "Bear" Beddoes; Dunk Burns
- Website: www.fightthebear.net

Fight the Bear are a ska/rock band. Their debut full-length album, Gutter Love, was released in 2006. Their second studio album, Dead Sea Fruit, was released in 2009. In 2011, Fight the Bear played at T in the Park 2011, and were featured as BBC Radio 1's Tip of the Week. The band's third album, 38 Degrees, was released on 30 August 2013.

== Members ==
=== Current members ===
- Jonny Keeley – vocals, guitar
- Jamie Furber – vocals, guitar
- Bear – bass
- Dunk Burns – drums

== Discography ==
=== Studio albums ===
- Gutter Love (2006)
- Dead Sea Fruit (2009)
- 38 Degrees (2013)
