= Black Gorilla =

British-German disco and funk group

- Origin: Leicester, United Kingdom
- Genres: Disco; Funk
- Years active: 1976–1980
- Labels: Pye Records, Response Records, Phonogram Records
- Past members: Dianne McDonald; St. Clair Harris; Fitzroy Clarke; Vernon Hughes; Martin Potter; Sylvester Dowe; Victor Watson; John Barrow; Dean Sargent

Black Gorilla was a British-German disco and funk group. They are best known for their 1977 single "Gimme Dat Banana", which reached the top 30 in the UK singles chart.

== History ==
The group began as a studio project in Germany built around the song "Gimme Dat Banana". The track was written by Rainer Petsch, Ekkehard Stein, and Bernd Dietrich, produced by Michael Holm, and recorded by anonymous session musicians. CBS Records released the single in Germany in 1976 without much success.

However, the song started getting attention in British nightclubs. Pye Records picked up the UK licensing rights and released it on their Response Records imprint. To promote the single and perform it live, Pye recruited a soul and funk band called Fascination from Leicester (though guitarist Victor Watson was from Wolverhampton). The touring lineup featured Dianne McDonald, St. Clair Harris, and Fitzroy Clarke, alongside Vernon Hughes, Martin Potter, Sylvester Dowe, Victor Watson, John Barrow, and Dean Sargent.

Under the name Black Gorilla, the band toured the UK. "Gimme Dat Banana" reached number 29 on the UK Singles Chart in September 1977, as well as number 31 on the Record Mirror disco charts, earning the group an appearance on Top of the Pops. The song also reached number 20 on the Swedish pop charts the following April. It was Black Gorilla's only charting single.

Following the tour, the British musicians wanted to write and perform their own material. However, the label continued to use German session musicians for subsequent releases, including the singles "Bamboo Child" and "Soul Dancer". When Phonogram Records released the group's only studio album, Private Collection, in 1978, the cover featured photographs of the live band, but none of the British members actually played on the record. Frustrated by the manufactured recording setup and ongoing financial issues, the touring band permanently split up in 1980.

== Aftermath ==
After Black Gorilla disbanded, Dean Sargent and John Barrow formed the band The Swinging Laurels. They went on to provide session brass for Fun Boy Three on "The Telephone Always Rings", and performed with acts like Culture Club and The Clash. Barrow later documented his experiences with Black Gorilla and the wider music industry in his autobiography, How NOT to Make It in the Pop World.

Lead vocalist Dianne McDonald died in July 2003.

== Discography ==
=== Albums ===
- Private Collection (1978, Phonogram Records)

=== Singles ===
- "Gimme Dat Banana" (1976/1977)
- "Bamboo Child" (1978)
- "Soul Dancer" (1979)
