= A Dozen Summers =

- Theatrical Poster
- Directed by: Kenton Hall
- Written by: Kenton Hall
- Produced by: Alexzandra Jackson, Kenton Hall
- Starring: Scarlet Hall; Hero Hall; Colin Baker; Ewen MacIntosh; Sarah Warren; Kenton Hall
- Cinematography: Geoffrey Gilson
- Edited by: Kenton Hall, Geoffrey Gilson
- Music by: Andrew Stamp (score), ist (songs)
- Production company: Monkey Basket Films
- Distributed by: Ballpark Film Distributors
- Release date: 21 August 2015
- Running time: 82 minutes
- Country: United Kingdom
- Language: English

A Dozen Summers is a 2015 family comedy film. It was written and directed by Kenton Hall and stars Scarlet Hall, Hero Hall, Colin Baker, Ewen MacIntosh, Sarah Warren and Kenton Hall. It received a limited UK cinema release on 21 August 2015.

== Plot ==
Maisie and Daisy McCormack are two, ordinary twelve-year-old girls trying to make their way through the minefield of life in the 21st century. Which, as far as they're concerned, is largely a case of trying to work out why grown-ups behave so oddly on such a regular basis.

When they interrupt a children's adventure story in progress, by scaring off the Narrator, they hijack the film and proceed to tell the story of their own lives, through the lens of the movies they've seen.

Jacqueline, their mother is a struggling model with an idiosyncratic parenting method. Henry, their father, a writer who has sacrificed more than they realize to give them a stable home life.

They take us through bad dates with Jacqueline, home-life with Henry, school life (with added were-wolves and vampires), before finally being forced to take the first tentative steps into adulthood when Jacqueline finally settles down and they decide to set their father up with their teacher, Miss Walters.

And they need to do it all before the story they interrupted re-asserts itself. It's a race against time -and Maisie and Daisy are learning it's not necessarily a race they can win.

And, in the end, that might not be such a bad thing after all.

== Cast ==
- Scarlet Hall as Maisie
- Hero Hall as Daisy
- Colin Baker as The Narrator
- Ewen MacIntosh as Gary
- Sarah Warren as Jacqueline
- Kenton Hall as Henry
- Holly Jacobson as Jennifer
- Quinton Nyrienda as Matty
- David Knight as Samuel
- Yasmin Allen as Beth

== Release ==
A Dozen Summers premiered in the US on 19 May 2015 at Phoenix Comicon. In the US, it was also an official selection of Mill Valley Film Festival as part of its Children's Film Fest and Mind the Gap strands. In its native UK, it received a limited theatrical release in the UK from 21 August 2015 via Ballpark Film Distributors.

== Awards ==
"A Dozen Summers" was nominated for or won several awards during its festival run, including nominations for "Best Feature Film for Children" at Fan Chile and Int. Children's TV Festival Dytiatko in Ukraine, and wins for Best Screenplay (Kenton Hall) and Best Actress (joint – Scarlet Hall and Hero Hall) at Festival de Cine Fantastico de Torremolinos in Spain.
