= The Apollinaires =

British post-punk band

- Also known as: The Volkswagens
- Origin: Leicester
- Genres: funk, 2 Tone
- Years active: 1981-1983
- Label: 2 Tone Records
- Spinoff of: I Y A Volkswagens
- Past members: Paul Tickle, Tom Brown, Francis Brown, Kraig Thornber, James Hunt, Simon Kirk, Peter Millen, Laurence Wood, Paul Hood, Chris Freestone, Stephen Leonard-Williams

The Apollinaires were a British 2 Tone/post-punk group from Leicester, England, signed to 2 Tone Records.

== History ==
The band formed in Leicester as a six-piece, composed of musicians from various local bands and students from the Leicester School of Art. Four members of the band had previously been in an industrial band named I Y A Volkswagens, which had released one single on Rough Trade Records called "Kill Myself". After the demise of that band they reformed as The Volkswagens, and as their sound moved from post-punk to a more dance sound, they worked with members of another Leicester band called The Swinging Laurels as their horn section.

In 1982 the band signed to Coventry's 2 Tone Records and changed their name to The Apollinaires, expanding to a ten-piece at the same time with the addition an in-house horn section. They recorded their first single, "The Feeling's Gone" with Jerry Dammers, featuring vocals from Rhoda Dakar of The Bodysnatchers.

After this the band toured extensively in the UK with bands including The Higsons and The Beat, and also played concerts in France, recorded BBC Radio 1 sessions for John Peel and Kid Jensen, and released a second single entitled "Envy the Love". Their TV appearances included Channel 4's The Switch. They also released a third single in 1983 on a small Birmingham independent label entitled "Put People First". Eventually, however, the band split up due to the difficulties of co-ordinating their large number of members.

== Personnel ==
- Paul Tickle, Vocals
- Tom Brown, guitar
- Francis Brown, Guitar (died 17 March 2010)
- Kraig Thornber, Drums
- James Hunt, Bass
- Simon Kirk, Percussion
- Peter Millen, Alto Sax. Millen went on to run a design business in New York City.
- Laurence Wood, Tenor Sax
- Paul Hood, Trombone
- Chris Freestone, Trumpet
- Stephen Leonard-Williams, Flute

== Singles ==
- "The Feeling's Gone" (2 Tone Records, 1982, produced by Jerry Dammers)
- "Envy the Love" (2 Tone Records, 1982, produced by Warne Livesey)
- "Put People First/Theme from Put People First" (B.F.W. / T.U.R.C., 1983, produced by Jo King)
