= Summer Sundae =

Annual music festival held in England

Coordinates: 52°37′27.76″N 1°07′21.86″W

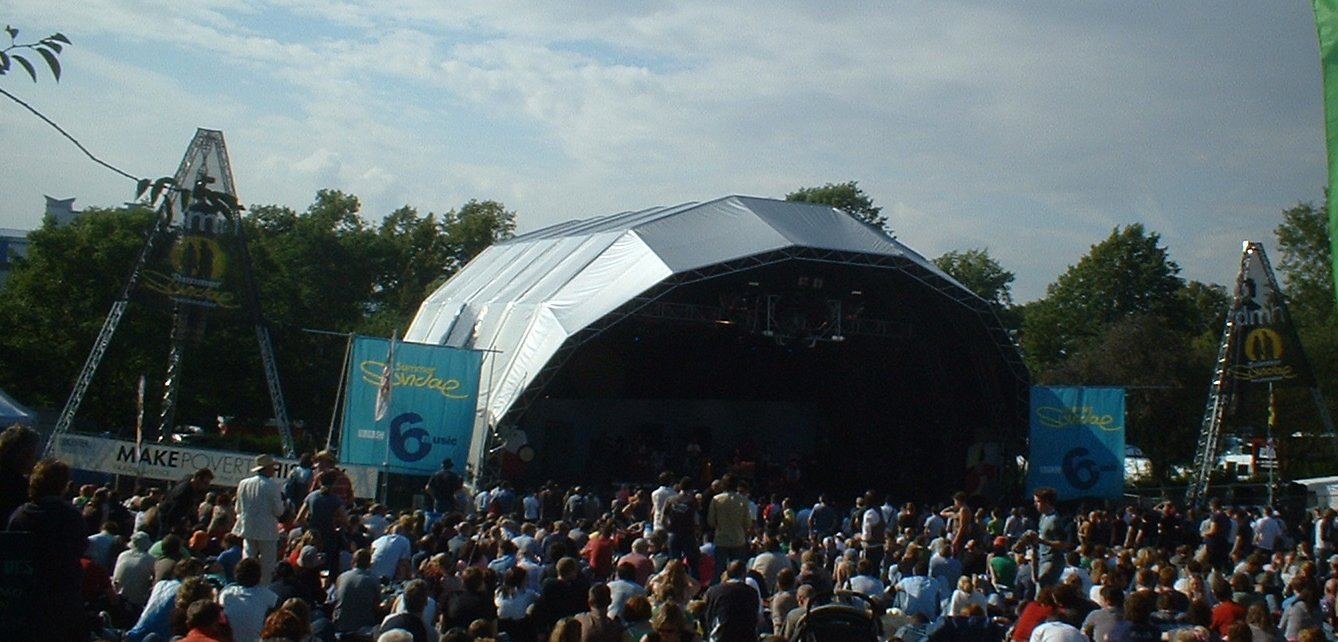
- The main stage at the 2005 festival
- Locations: Leicester, England, UK
- Years active: 2001–2012
- Website: www.summersundae.com

Summer Sundae (also called the Summer Sundae Weekender) was an annual music festival held in Leicester, England which initially focused on indie, alternative, and local music. The festival began as a one-dayer in 2001 and grew year on year since then, adding first one and then two campsites, and later involved five stages running over three days.

== Event ==
It was hosted by the city's De Montfort Hall, both in the hall itself, and over four outdoor stages in the hall's grounds, and including part of Victoria Park. A section of the park was fenced off for camping during the weekend of the festival. The festival was for a time sponsored in part by the digital radio station BBC 6 Music, which in return had exclusive broadcasting rights. The festival usually took place in August and grew from two stages to five over the course of six years. In 2005 the festival welcomed over 70 artists, both well-known and established bands, and local bands from around the East Midlands. This extended to over 100 bands, and the first ever sold-out festival in 2006.

The main stage of the 2007 festival.

The festival in later years was run over five stages: The Outside Stage was by far the largest and hosted the bigger bands, in conjunction with the Indoor Stage, the main auditorium of the De Montfort Hall. In addition, The Musician Stage was a tent featuring mainly acoustic and roots music at times when the Outside stage is quiet, and The Rising Stage featured new and local talent. In 2006 the eFESTIVALS Cabaret Stage was added, and these were added to in 2008 by the Phrased & Confused/Bathysphere tent, offering spoken word performances during the day and electronica artists later on. In 2012, the Musician Stage and the Rising Stage were replaced by two new performance spaces in The Village, named the Into the Wild stage and the Watering Hole following the festival's safari theme.

From 2006 the festival was preceded the night before it began by an official warm up party, hosted by Pineapster to provide entertainment to those campers arriving in the City on the Thursday night and raise money for LOROS, a local hospice. From 2007 it became a full Fringe festival event entitled the Summer Sundae Fringe Festival occurring in the week or fortnight up to the festival curated by local arts bodies across Leicester and Leicestershire, culminating in a series of warm-up parties. In March 2008 the festival put on a Taste of Summer Sundae gig to provide a flavour of the bands expected to play the main festival.

== Dates and line-ups ==
The inaugural event was held on one day in July on two stages with 14 acts including Morcheeba on the outdoor stage and Lambchop on the indoor stage, with Howard Smith and the Diplomats (formerly the Hornets) as the opening act.

The 2002 Summer Sundae Festival took place between the 6th and 7 July 2002. Highlights of the festival included I Am Kloot, Beth Orton and local favourites Cornershop. There was a strong Americana influence including the Be Good Tanyas, Calexico and The Handsome Family. David Byrne headlined.

The 2003 Summer Sundae Festival saw the introduction of a dance music to Friday night, and took place over three days between the 8th and 10 August 2003. Saturday's line-up included Alabama 3, Chumbawamba, Laura Cantrell, British Sea Power, Kathryn Williams and The Herbaliser with Gotan project Headlining. Sunday's bill included Ian McCulloch, Aqualung, Durutti Column, Pernice Brothers, Cosmic Rough Riders and Richard Hawley. The finale was a Concert for a Landmine Free World featuring Emmylou Harris, Steve Earle, Billy Bragg, Joan Baez and Chrissie Hynde sharing the stage.

The 2004 Summer Sundae Weekender took place between 13 and 15 August 2004. Highlights of this festival included Kings of Convenience, Super Furry Animals, Ed Harcourt, Air, Amy Winehouse, The Beta Band, Kasabian, Sia and Adem.

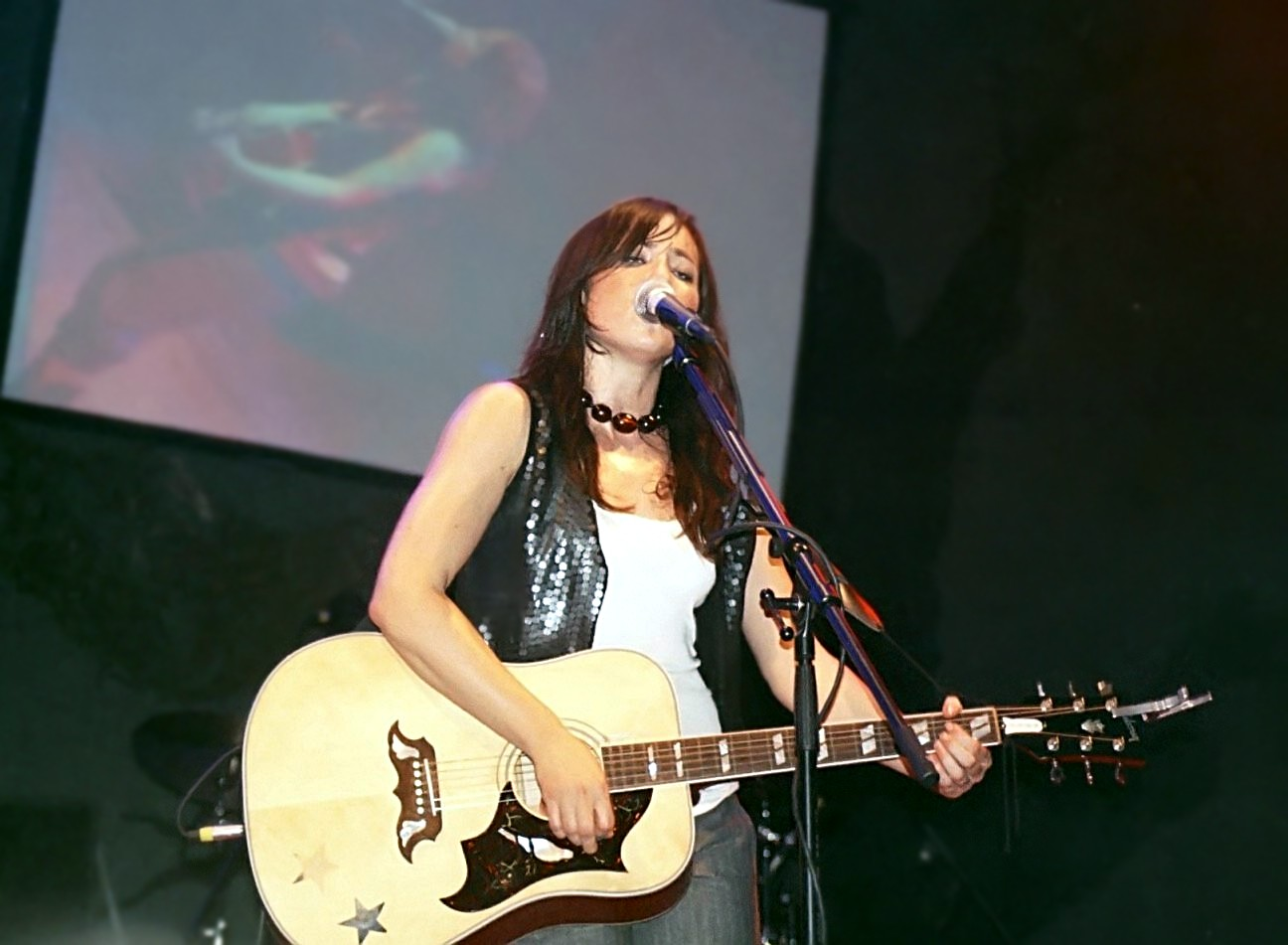
KT Tunstall at the 2005 Summer Sundae

The 2005 Summer Sundae took place between 12 and 14 August 2005.

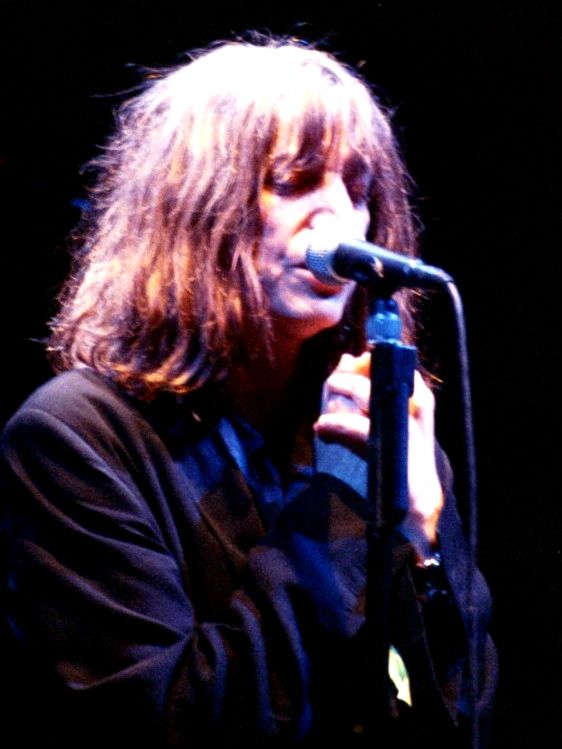
Patti Smith at the 2005 event

The 2006 Summer Sundae took place between 11 and 13 August 2006.

The 2007 Summer Sundae Weekender festival took place between the 10 and 12 August 2007.

The 2008 Summer Sundae Weekender festival took place between the 8 and 10 August 2008.

The 2009 Summer Sundae Weekender festival took place 14–16 August 2009. The Streets were due to headline the main stage on Friday but pulled out earlier the same day due to illness. Skint & Demoralised, Beth Jeans Houghton and Jeremy Warmsley played sets in the Phrased & Confused tent.

The 2010 Summer Sundae Weekender festival took place 13–15 August 2010.

The 2011 Summer Sundae Weekender festival took place 12–14 August 2011.

The 2012 Summer Sundae Weekender festival took place 17–19 August. This was the last one held.

== See also ==
- Music in Leicester
