= By the Rivers =

British reggae band

By The Rivers are a British six-piece reggae band from Leicester, England.

Their sound incorporates influences from Ska, Reggae, Soul, Motown, Afro-Beat and Dub.

== History ==
Termed 'Brit Reggae' by Reggae pioneer David Rodigan, By The Rivers was formed in 2010 and has since performed at Glastonbury (on the BBC Introducing Stage), T In The Park, Larmer Tree Festival, Boomtown, Isle of Wight Festival, Bestival, Kendall Calling, LeeFest, Green Man Festival and many others.

The band has received national airplay on BBC Radio 1Xtra, BBC 6 Music and BBC Radio 2. The band's performance of 'Run Home' at Glastonbury 2013 was aired nationwide by the BBC as part of their coverage.

The band also released their eponymous debut album in May 2013. Reviews by Blues and Soul magazine, God Is In The TV, Gigewise and After Dark Cardiff were all positive.

The band have extensively toured the UK and central Europe. Their Official UK Tour ran from September to November 2013, visiting cities across the country during that period.

== Band members ==
- Nile Barrow, lead vocalist
- Jordan Birtles, vocals, percussion
- Sam Read, vocals, guitar, keyboard
- Matt Willars, bass
- Will Todd, saxophone
- Leo May, trumpet

== Discography ==
=== Albums ===
- By the Rivers, 2013. Cover art by Joe Wilson.

=== EPs ===
- What You See, 2016.
- Midnight Raver, 2017.
