= List of people from Leicester and Leicestershire =

This is a list of notable people born in Leicester, England, or in the county of Leicestershire, educated there, or otherwise associated with the city or county.

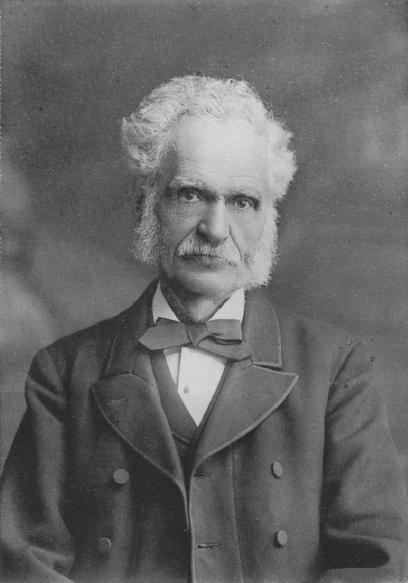
Henry Walter Bates

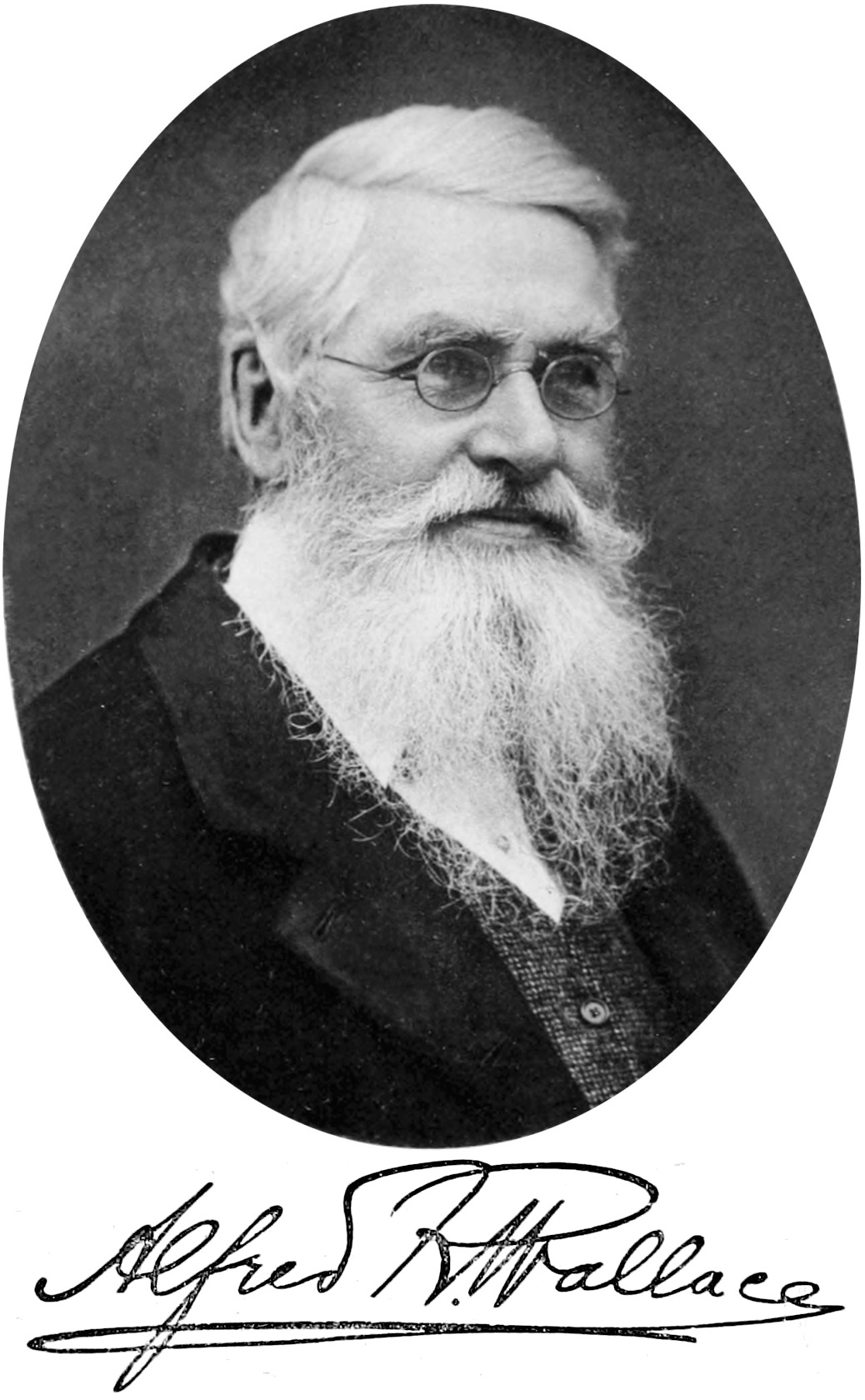
Alfred Russel Wallace

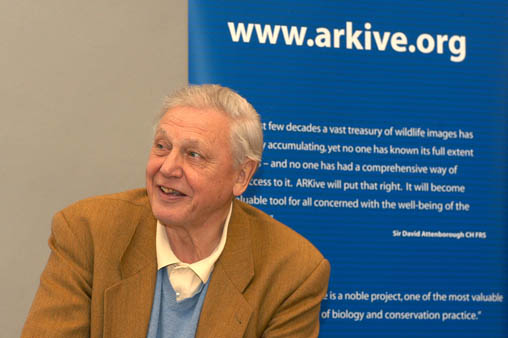
David Attenborough

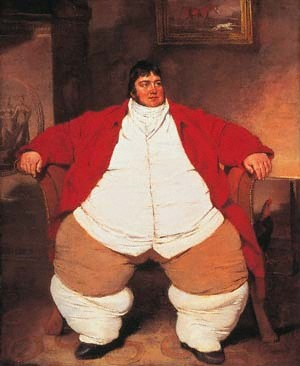
Daniel Lambert

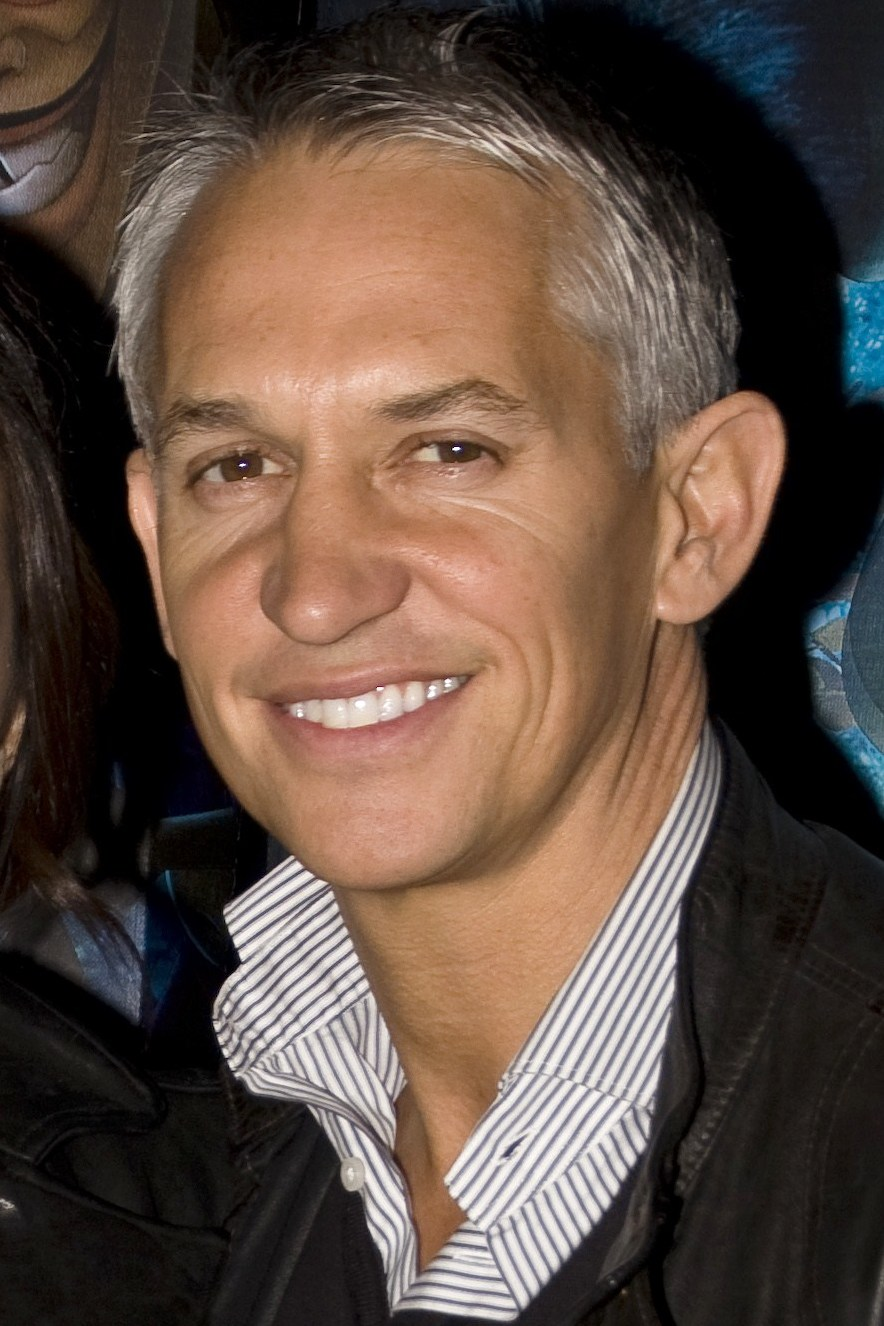
Gary Lineker

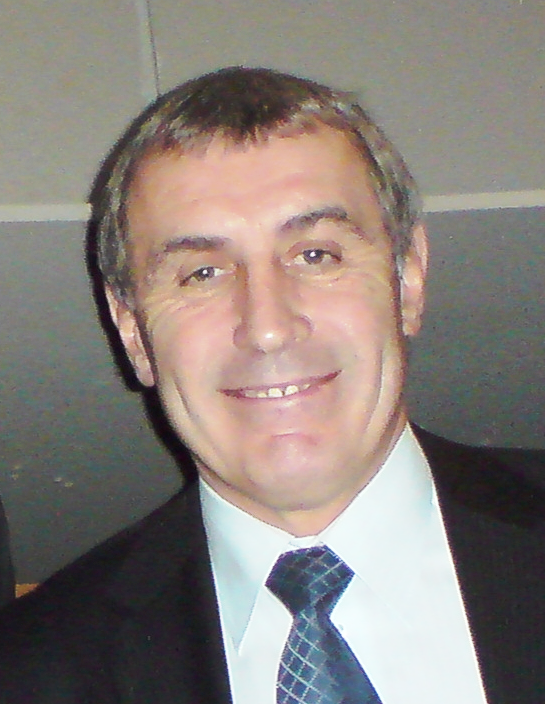
Peter Shilton

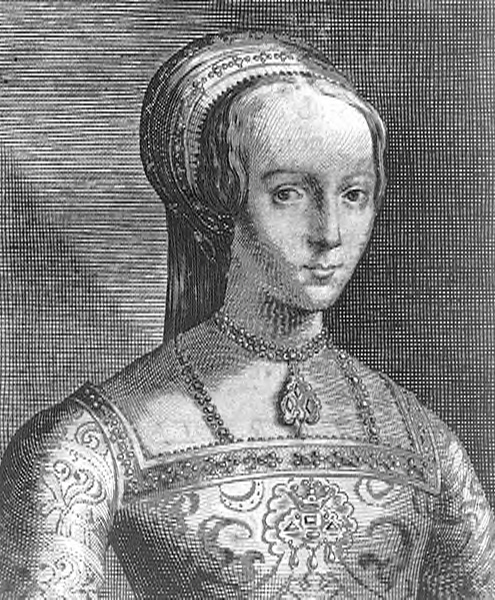
Lady Jane Grey

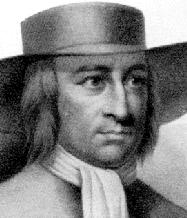
George Fox

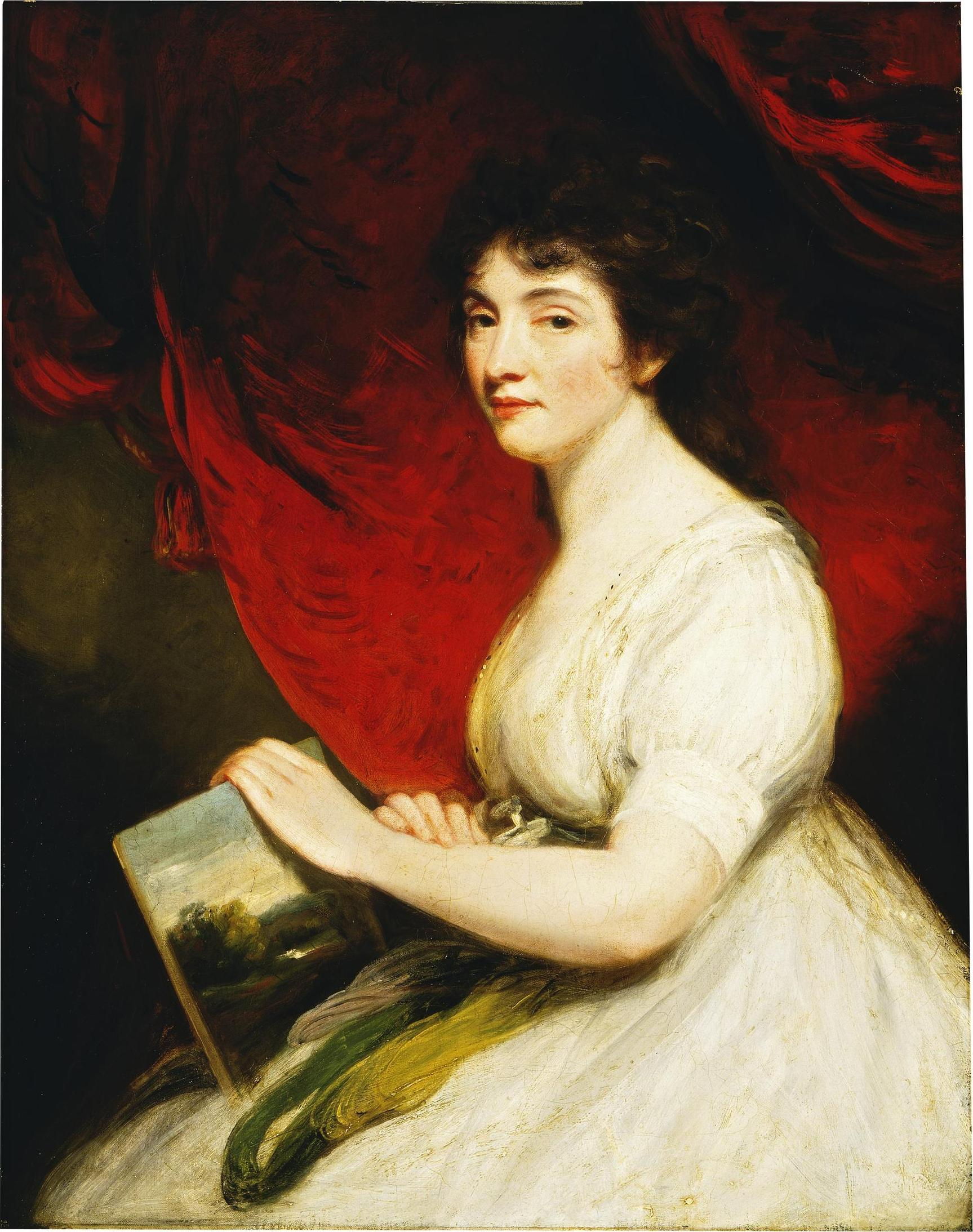
Mary Linwood

== Academia (except scientists) ==
- Graham Barnfield (sociologist)
- Caroline Ashurst Biggs (suffragette & academic)
- James Densley (sociologist)
- Mark Fisher (21st century cultural theorist and philosopher)
- W. G. Hoskins (landscape historian)
- Jack Simmons (historian esp. of British railways)

== Architecture ==
- John Breedon Everard (architect and civil engineer)
- Ernest Gimson (architect, craftsman)
- Henry Goddard (architect)
- Stockdale Harrison (architect)
- John Johnson (architect)
- William Keay (architect and civil engineer)
- Samuel Perkins Pick (architect)
- Arthur Wakerley (architect)

== Arts and entertainment ==
=== Acting, film, and comedy ===
- Richard Armitage (actor, North and South, Robin Hood, The Hobbit)
- Richard Attenborough (actor, Jurassic Park; director, Gandhi)
- Patrick Barlow (actor, comedian and playwright)
- Oliver Bayldon (production designer and writer)
- Lydia Rose Bewley (stage and movie actor, The Inbetweeners Movie)
- Norman Bird (actor, The Lord of the Rings, Cash on Demand)
- Jeremy Bulloch (actor, Star Wars)
- Graham Chapman (comedian, Monty Python)
- Selina Chilton (actress, Doctors)
- Amanda Drew (actress, EastEnders)
- Betty Driver (singer and actress, Coronation Street)
- Terri Dwyer (actress, Hollyoaks)
- Sheila Fearn (actor, The Likely Lads, Whatever Happened to the Likely Lads?, George and Mildred)
- Stephen Frears (film director, Dangerous Liaisons)
- Rosemary Harris (actress, "Spider-Man film trilogy")
- Tom Hopper (actor, Merlin, Doctor Who)
- Colin Hurley (Shakespearean actor)
- Dominic Keating (actor, Star Trek: Enterprise)
- Alison King (actress, Coronation Street)
- Michael Kitchen (actor, Foyle's War)
- John Leeson (actor, voice of K-9 in Doctor Who and Bungle in Rainbow and narrator for the children's hospital radio series, The Space Gypsy Adventures)
- Barry Letts (actor, television director, writer and producer)
- Bill Maynard (actor, Coronation Street, Heartbeat)
- Parminder Nagra (actor, Bend It Like Beckham, ER)
- David Neilson (actor, Coronation Street)
- Andy Nyman (actor)
- Vincenzo Nicoli (actor)
- Kate O'Mara (actress, Howards' Way)
- Steve Oram (actor, Sightseers, A Dark Song)
- Rachel Parris (actor, comedian, and television presenter)
- John Payne (Canadian voice actor who was born in town and raised in Melton Mowbray, Leicestershire but moved to Vancouver, British Columbia)
- Helen Pearson (actress, Hollyoaks)
- Adrian Scarborough (actor, The Madness of King George, Gosford Park)
- Josette Simon (actress, Blakes 7)
- Una Stubbs (actress, Till Death Us Do Part, Sherlock)
- Rakhee Thakrar (actress, EastEnders)
- Kraig Thornber (actor, The Rocky Horror Show, etc.)
- Mark Wingett (actor, The Bill)

=== Broadcasting and journalism ===
- David Attenborough (broadcaster and naturalist)
- Karl Beattie (Living TV presenter, Most Haunted and Most Haunted Live)
- Biddy Baxter (editor, Blue Peter)
- Manish Bhasin (BBC sports presenter, Football Focus)
- O.J. Borg (radio and TV presenter)
- Martine Croxall (TV newsreader, BBC)
- Julie Etchingham (TV newsreader, Sky News, ITN)
- Derrick Evans (TV fitness instructor, Mr Motivator)
- Martin Gillingham (sports commentator and journalist)
- Clare Hollingworth (foreign correspondent)
- David Icke (conspiracy theorist)
- Oliver Kamm (Times leader writer and columnist)
- Kevin Myers (journalist, Irish Independent)
- Sir Henry Norman, 1st Baronet (journalist and politician who revealed the truth about the Dreyfus affair)
- Jon Tickle (Leicester University graduate, Brainiac: Science Abuse presenter)
- Tony Wadsworth (broadcaster, BBC)
- Gok Wan (fashion stylist and presenter of How to Look Good Naked, Channel 4)
- Arlo White (broadcaster, BBC)

=== Music ===
- Aetherfx (Jacob Tugby, industrial electronic musician)
- Laurel Aitken (singer, the "godfather of ska"; born in Cuba, lived on the St. Mark's Estate 1971–2005)
- Sam Bailey (winner of The X Factor 2013)
- Frank Benbini (drummer, Fun Lovin Criminals)
- Blab Happy (band)
- Black Widow (band)
- Blitzkrieg (band)
- Hannah Boleyn (singer-songwriter)
- The Bomb Party (band)
- Mahalia Burkmar (singer)
- Grace Burrows (English violinist and orchestra conductor)
- Felix Buxton (half of Basement Jaxx)
- Scott Xylo (multi-genre Music Producer & Songwriter)
- Cornershop (band)
- Crazyhead (band)
- Brian Davison (drummer, The Nice, Refugee, Gong)
- John Deacon (bassist, Queen)
- The Deep Freeze Mice (band)
- Diesel Park West (band)
- Disco Zombies (band)
- Easy Life (band)
- Family (band)
- Gaye Bykers on Acid (band)
- Gemini (DJ)
- Robert Gotobed (drummer, Wire)
- Davy Graham (folk musician)
- Ric Grech (violinist, bassist, writer, producer, member of Blind Faith, Traffic)
- H "Two" O (band who produced the 2008 song "What's It Gonna Be?")
- Kevin Hewick (singer)
- Engelbert Humperdinck (singer, Release Me, Misty Blue and 2012 Eurovision entrant.)
- The Hunters Club (band)
- John Illsley (bassist, Dire Straits)
- Kasabian (band)
- KAV (former Happy Mondays guitarist, solo artist, musician, co-launched UK festival Getloaded in the Park)
- Tony Kaye (keyboard player, Yes)
- Sharron Kraus (folk singer)
- Lisa Lashes (DJ)
- Jon Lord (organist, Deep Purple)
- Paul Martinez (bassist, guitarist, writer)
- Wes McGhee (guitarist, singer)
- Tom Meighan (vocalist, Kasabian)
- Mark Morrison (singer, "Return of the Mack")
- Perfume (band)
- Sergio Pizzorno (musician, Kasabian)
- Po! (band)
- Prolapse (band)
- Scum Pups (band)
- Showaddywaddy (band)
- Molly Smitten-Downes (2014 Eurovision entrant)
- DJ SS (DJ and producer)
- Stunt (band)
- The Voom Blooms (band)
- Nancy Whiskey Folk singer most famous for "Freight Train". Lived in Leicestershire from 1958 and died in Leicester in 2003.
- David Wise (composer)
- Yeah Yeah Noh (band)
- The Young Knives (band)
- Moscow Circus (band)

=== Painters ===
- Lemuel Francis Abbott (portrait artist)
- Duncan Fegredo (comic book artist)
- John Flower (artist)
- Edith Gittins (artist and social reformer)
- John T. Kenney (artist and illustrator of The Railway Series)
- Benjamin Marshall (artist)
- Tom Marshall (artist and photo colouriser)
- Jemisha Maadhavji (portrait painter)

=== Writing (except journalism) ===
- Lemuel Abbott (clergyman and poet)
- James Allen (author)
- Elizabeth Arnold (children's writer)
- Anna Barbauld (writer and poet)
- Julian Barnes (author)
- Lizzie Berry (poet)
- David Campton (playwright, actor)
- John Cleveland (poet)
- Thomas Cooper (poet)
- J. T. Edson (author)
- Anne Fine (author)
- Martin Goodman (novelist, biographer and travel writer)
- Hal Iggulden (author)
- E. Phillips Oppenheim (prolific author, inventor of "Rogue Male" genre)
- Joe Orton (playwright)
- Lynda Page (author)
- Jessie Pope (writer and poet)
- Bali Rai (author)
- C. P. Snow (author)
- Nina Stibbe (author)
- Sue Townsend (author, Adrian Mole books)
- Ruth Wills (poet)
- Colin Wilson (author)

=== Others ===
- Gothy Kendoll (drag queen, DJ and OnlyFans content creator)
- Mary Linwood (needlewoman)
- Danica Taylor (television personality)

== Business ==
- Charles Bennion (shoe machinery manufacturer, philanthropist, bought Bradgate Park for the 'quiet enjoyment of the people of Leicestershire')
- Harold Berridge (civil engineer and mechanical engineer)
- Thomas Cook (travel agent)
- Nathaniel Corah (textile manufacturer)
- Henry Curry (founder of Currys)
- Thomas Fielding Johnson (worsted spinner, philanthropist, founding benefactor of Leicester University)
- William Inman (shipping company owner)
- Frank Jessop (In 1935 founded The Jessop Group Limited, photographic retailers and suppliers. "Jessops of Leicester")
- Harry Peach (furniture manufacturer and social campaigner)
- Henry Walker (founder of Walkers Crisps)
- Thomas White (merchant, philanthropist)
- William Wyggeston (merchant, philanthropist)

== Exploration ==
- Henry Bates (naturalist and explorer)
- Ed Stafford (explorer and author)
- Alfred Russel Wallace (naturalist, explorer, evolutionist and author, who briefly taught at Collegiate school)

== Military ==
- Nicholas Alkemade Lancaster tail gunner who jumped 18000 feet without a parachute and survived.
- General Sir Patrick Howard-Dobson, former Vice-Chief of Defence Staff
- M. E. Clifton James, actor trained to impersonate Bernard Montgomery in World War II
- Johnnie Johnson, World War II's top Allied fighter ace

== Politics and royalty ==
- Alastair Campbell (journalist and political advisor)
- Sir Arthur Haselrig, 2nd Baronet (MP for Leicestershire 1640–1653 & Leicester 1653 – 1659)
- Simon de Montfort, 6th Earl of Leicester (founder of the English Parliament)
- Lady Jane Grey ("Queen for Nine Days")
- Kelvin Hopkins (MP)
- Greg Knight (Former MP)
- Greville Janner (MP and barrister)
- Richard III of England
- Peter Soulsby (Mayor of Leicester, former MP)
- Claudia Webbe (Labour Party MP)

== Religion ==
- John Brown, famous evangelical preacher
- William Carey (missionary and translator)
- Charles Henry Carter (Baptist missionary and translator of the first English-Singhalese dictionary)
- George Davys (Bishop and tutor to Queen Victoria)
- George Fox (founder of the Religious Society of Friends, otherwise known as Quakers)
- Robert Hall (Baptist minister and preacher)
- Arthur Colborne Lankester (doctor and missionary)
- Hugh Latimer (Protestant Bishop and Martyr)
- Thomas Moor (only Protestant martyr to be burned at the stake at Leicester during the Marian persecutions, not to be confused with Catholic martyr Thomas More)
- Chanda Vyas (Hindu priest)
- John Wycliffe (Theologian, Church reformer, translator of the Bible, Rector of Lutterworth)

== Science ==
- Alf Adams (physicist, inventor of the strained quantum-well laser)
- William Henry Bragg (physicist, chemist and mathematician)
- William Lawrence Bragg (physicist)
- Harold Hopkins
- Harold Edwin Hurst (Hydrologist whose study of the Nile led to a better understanding of statistics with applications in dam design and finance.)
- Sir Alec Jeffreys (geneticist and developer of genetic fingerprinting) (DNA)
- Roger Mason
- Benjamin Ward Richardson (physician)
- Cedric Smith (statistician and geneticist)

== Sport ==
=== Boxing ===
- George Aldridge (born 1936) (former British middleweight champion; grew up in Market Harborough)
- Pat Butler (1913-2001) (former British welterweight champion; born in Rothley)
- Errol Christie (1963-2017) (former European middleweight champion; born in Leicester)
- Albert Cocksedge (1884-1928, early 20th century English champion at various weights; born in Leicester
- Shaun Cummins (1968-2012) (fought for British and European titles at super-welterweight and middleweight; born in Leicester)
- Jack Gardner (1926–1978) (British, British Empire, and European heavyweight champion)
- Tony McKenzie (born 1963) (former British light welterweight champion; born in Leicester)
- Rendall Munroe (born 1980) (EBU and Commonwealth super bantamweight boxing champion; born in Leicester)
- Louis Norman (born 1993) (British flyweight challenger; lives in Shepshed)
- Chris Pyatt (born 1963) (former World Champion middleweight boxer)
- Tony Sibson (born 1958) (former European and Commonwealth middleweight champion; born in Leicester)
- Len Wickwar (1911-1980) (holds the record for highest number of professional fights, 470; born in Leicester)
- Tim Wood (1951-2010) (former British light heavyweight champion; grew up in Leicester)

=== Chess ===
- Henry Ernest Atkins (chess master, nine-time British champion; the H.E. Atkins tournament is run annually in Leicester)
- Mark Hebden (chess grandmaster)
- Glenn Flear (chess grandmaster)

=== Cricket ===
- James Barnfather (played first-class cricket for Essex in 1924)
- Samit Patel (England international cricketer)
- M. J. K. Smith (England cricket captain)

=== Cycling ===
- Lucy Garner (twice Junior World Champion)
- Bert Harris (first professional cycling champion of England)
- Fred Wood (multi World Cycling Champion, 1880s)

=== Football ===
- Ian Baraclough (football manager)
- Harvey Barnes (English footballer)
- Ashley Chambers (English footballer)
- Kiernan Dewsbury-Hall (English footballer)
- Dion Dublin (England International footballer)
- Kevin Friend (football referee)
- Emile Heskey (England international footballer)
- Chris Kirkland (England international footballer)
- Norman Leet (English former footballer)
- Gary Lineker (England international footballer, World Cup 1986 Golden Boot Winner, sports presenter)
- Joe Mattock (English footballer)
- Holly Morgan, (English footballer, captain of Leicester City W.F.C.)
- Norman Plummer (Leicester City footballer, captain 1949 FA Cup Final, decorated World War II veteran)
- Levi Porter (English footballer)
- Michael Robinson (footballer, Spanish TV presenter)
- Peter Shilton (England men's most capped footballer)
- Luke Varney (footballer)

=== Rugby Union ===
- Dan Cole (rugby union footballer for Leicester Tigers and England)
- Martin Corry (former rugby union footballer, former Leicester captain and former England captain)
- Louis Deacon (Leicester Tigers captain, England International)
- Martin Johnson (rugby union footballer, Leicester and England's World-Cup winning captain; grew up in Market Harborough)
- Steve Redfern (rugby union footballer, Leicester Tigers walk of legends)
- Dean Richards (rugby union footballer and coach, Leicester Tigers and England captain)
- Ollie Smith (Rugby Union international)
- Harry Thacker (Leicester Tigers)
- John Wells (Leicester Tigers captain, head coach and England Forwards coach)

=== Snooker ===
- Tom Ford (snooker player)
- Shailesh Jogia (snooker player)
- Joe O'Connor (snooker player)
- Mark Selby (snooker player; the 2014, 2016, 2017 and 2021 world snooker champion and eight ball pool world champion 2007)
- Willie Thorne (snooker player and commentator)
- Ben Woollaston (snooker player)

=== Speedway ===
- Geoff Bouchard
- Ivor Brown
- Cyril "Squib" Burton
- Bruce Forrester
- David Howe
- Paddy Mills
- Graham Plant
- Fred Wilkinson
- Len Williams (Sheffield, Leicester and England)
- Stan Williams (Sheffield, Coventry and England)

=== Others ===
- Chris Adcock (English and Great Britain badminton player)
- Tony Allcock (fourteen-time bowls world champion, now chief executive of Bowls England)
- Andrew Betts (Great Britain basketball player)
- Katie Boulter (professional tennis player)
- Jamie Caven (darts player)
- Roger Clark (rally driving champion)
- Mark Cox (English professional tennis player)
- Jennie Fletcher (Olympic gold medallist in swimming)
- Bob Gerard (racing driver)
- Jamie Green (race car driver in the Deutsche Tourenwagen Masters championship)
- Tamsin Greenway, former English netball player and coach
- Phelan Hill (Rowing cox Olympic Gold medalist 2016 and Olympic Bronze medalist 2012)
- John Arthur Jarvis (swimmer, 1900 Olympic medallist)
- Ken Johnson (Olympic athlete)
- Charlie Christina Martin hill climb and Le Mans Cup racing driver
- John Merricks (sailor, 1996 Olympic medallist)
- James Wilks (UFC fighter)
- Roger Williamson (Formula One driver)

== Miscellaneous ==
- Donald Hings (1907–2004), inventor of the Walkie-Talkie
- Daniel Lambert (1770–1809), heaviest man in England
- Sydney Lucas (1900–2008), last soldier to serve in both World Wars
- Ian McAteer, Scottish-born former gangster
- Kim McLagan, model and cosmetologist
- Joseph Merrick (1862–1890), "The Elephant Man"
- Charles Killick Millard (1870–1952), Medical Officer for Health and founder of the Voluntary Euthanasia Legalisation Society
- Phil Shaw, inventor of extreme ironing
- Anick Soni, intersex activist and creative consultant.
- Madeleine McCann, girl who infamously disappeared in 2007
