= Frederick Wood =

Frederick Wood may refer to:

- Freddy Wood, English football player who played as a goalkeeper
- Frederick Wood (historian) (1903–1989), New Zealand historian and university professor
- Frederick Wood (industrialist) (1926–2003), businessman and industrialist
- Frederick Charles Wood, American serial killer
- Fred Thomas Wood, Chilean footballer

== See also ==
- Fred Wood (disambiguation)
- Frederick Woods (disambiguation)
