= Corah =

Corah may refer to:

- N. Corah & Sons, Leicester hosiery and textiles company
  - Nathaniel Corah (1777–1831), founder of N. Corah & Sons
