= Fred Wood =

Fred Wood may refer to:

- Fred Wood (cyclist) (1861–1935), English cyclist
- Fred Wood (baseball) (1865–?), Canadian-born baseball player
- Fred Wood (rugby union) (1884–1924), Australian rugby union player
- Fred Wood (politician) (born 1945), American politician in Idaho
- Fred Wood (footballer) (1901–1957), Australian rules footballer
- Fred Thomas Wood (1917–1994), Chilean footballer
- Fred Wood (actor) (born 1922), English actor

== See also ==
- Frederick Wood (disambiguation)
