= Shree Sanatan Hindu Mandir =

Hindu temples in London, England

The Shree Sanatan Hindu Mandir (Hindi: श्री सनातन हिंदू मंदिर) is the name of two Hindu temples in London, one situated off the Ealing Road in Wembley, in Brent and the other in Whipps Cross in Waltham Forest near Leytonstone. They are run by charity Shri Vallabh Nidhi UK.

The temples follow Sanatan Dharma (Hinduism), and in common with other temples called Sanatan which is the true (original) name of the religion that was later referred to as 'Hindu'.

== Wembley temple ==
Shree Sanatan Hindu Mandir
- श्री सनातन हिंदू मंदिर
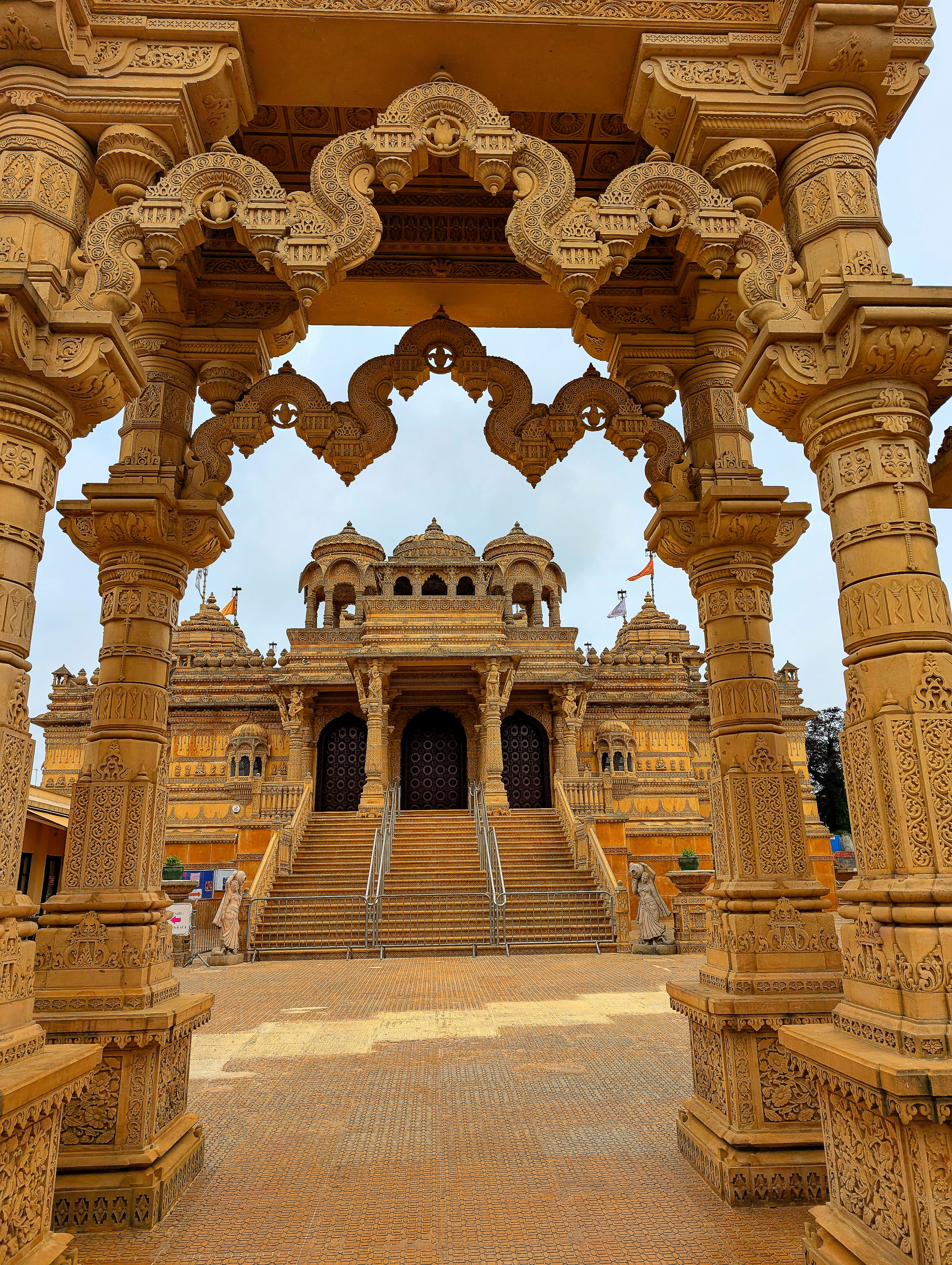
- A front view of the Shree Sanatan Hindu Mandir in Wembley, London

Religion
- Affiliation: Hinduism
- District: Greater London
- Festivals: Diwali, Navratri, Jalaram Jayanti, Krishna Janmashtami

Location
- Location: Wembley, London
- Country: United Kingdom
- Interactive map of Shree Sanatan Hindu Mandir

Architecture
- Type: Vedic
- Creator: Shri Vallabh Nidhi UK
- Completed: May 2010
- Inscriptions: Vasudev Kutumbakaum
- Elevation: 20 m (66 ft)

Website
- svnuk.com

It was opened in the Summer of 2010, took 14 years to build, and is made entirely of imported Indian limestone. It was constructed according to the scriptures of the Hindu holy texts, and so contains no steel supports. Its site has an area of 2.4 acres (9,700 m^{2}).

Many of the temple's component pieces were hand carved in the town of Sola, in the Indian state of Gujarat - before being flown to Britain and assembled. There were 41 marble statues of deities made in India especially for the mandir. The interior is elaborately decorated with carvings on the pillars and walls, as well as the numerous shrines with painted figures of Hindu deities. Some famous spiritual leaders and forms of Gods from other religions are featured in the carvings, including one of Mother Teresa and the Sikh Guru Nanak. At its highest point, the temple is 66 ft (20m) tall.

The temple has the following deities: Shri Ganeshji, Shri Sahajanand Swami, Shri Amba Mataji, Shri Simandhar Swami, Shri Radha Krishna, Shri Ram Darbar, Shri Shrinathji, Shri Tirupati Balaji, Shri Shiv Parivar, Shri Jalaram Bapa, Shri Hanumanji, Shri Shirdi Sai Baba, Navgraha, Shri Padmavati Mata, Shri Saraswati Mata, Shri Ganga Mata, Shri Yamuna Mata, Shri Jhulelalji, Shri Ranchodji, among others.

The temple was built using funds raised by the charity Shri Vallabh Nidhi UK (SVNUK).

== Leytonstone temple ==
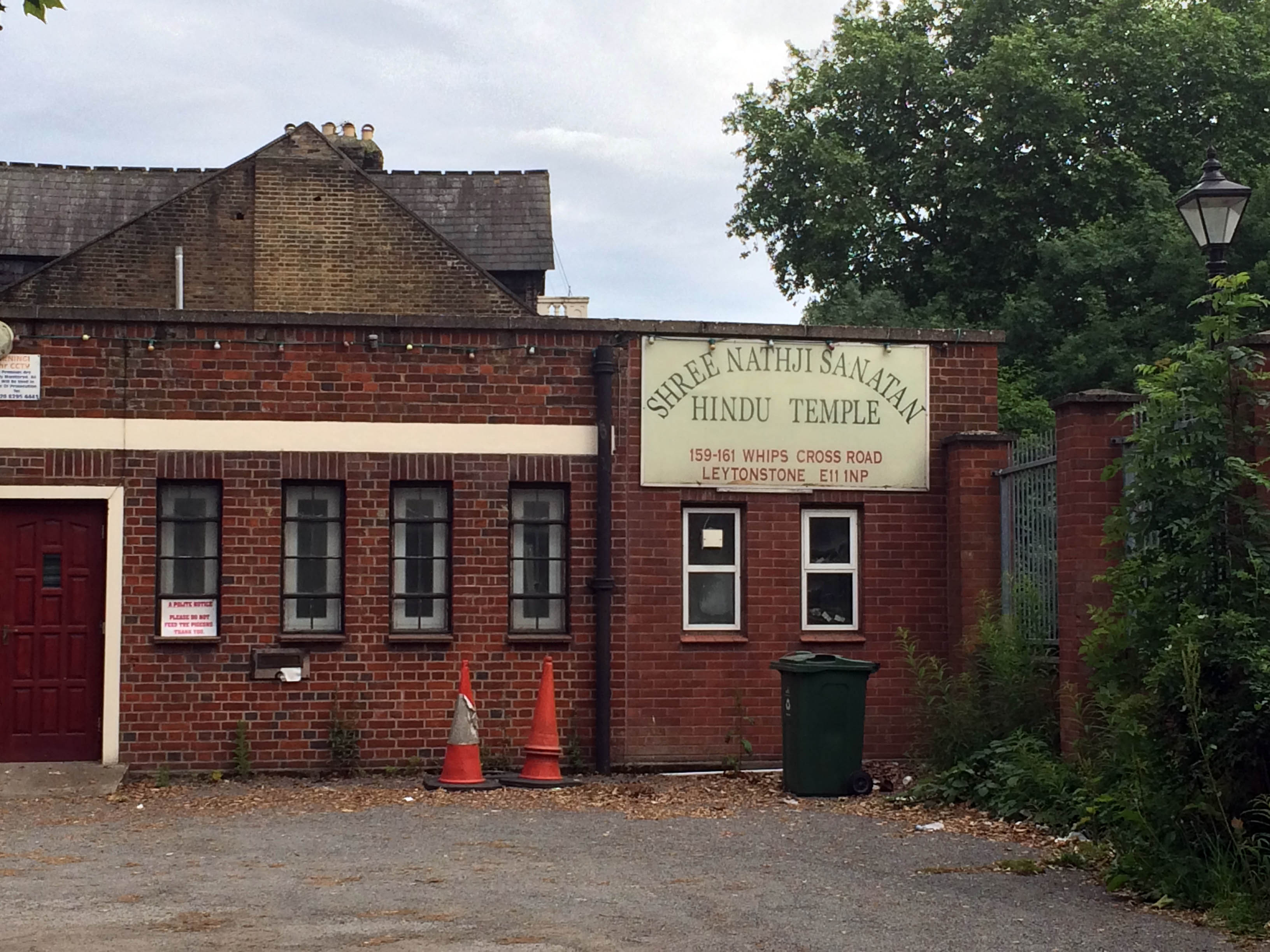
The original temple in Leytonstone

The temple in Leytonstone is called Shri Nathji Mandir and was inaugurated in June 1980. It has the following deities - Shri Ram, Shrinathji, Shiv Parivaar, Amba Mataji, Jalaram Bapa and Hanumanji.

== Shri Vallabh Nidhi UK ==
The charity which runs the temples was founded by Vaishnav Hindus in London and one of its objects is "Advance the Hindu religion in accordance with the teaching of Shri Vallabh" (Vallabha Acharya), the founder of the Pushtimarg sect. However, the temples are intended to be ecumenical. The Charity was founded by Late Shri Balmukund P Parikh & Shri Ramanbhai Patel of the six gham patidar community with the blessings of Krishna Shankar Shashriji (Dadaji).

== See also ==
- Hinduism in England
- BAPS Shri Swaminarayan Mandir London
