= Bennett Southwell =

Recipient of the George Cross

- Born: 21 March 1913; Rotherham, England
- Died: 17 October 1940 (aged 27); Hoxton, England
- Burial place: Gilroes Cemetery, Leicester
- Military career
- Allegiance: United Kingdom
- Branch: Royal Navy
- Service years: 1939–1940
- Rank: Ordinary Seaman
- Unit: HMS Vernon
- Conflicts: Second World War: Home Front; The Blitz †
- Awards: George Cross

Bennett Southwell, GC (21 March 1913 – 17 October 1940) was a member of a Royal Navy team carrying out bomb disposal when he was killed during the London blitz. He was awarded a posthumous George Cross.

== Early life ==
Southwell was born on 21 March 1913, son of George Frederick Southwell, who worked on the railways- at the time of his son's birth, as a porter- and Sarah Elizabeth (née James). Southwell was educated at Meadow Hall Road School in Rotherham, subsequently working as a domestic gardener before taking employment at the hosiery manufacturer N. Corah & Sons. Before the outbreak of war, he married Marion Halford; they had a son, Michael.

Southwell was enlisted into the Royal Navy in 1939. He was called up for training on 8 June 1940 and proceeded to HMS Ganges. He was then posted to HMS Vernon as part of the Land Mine Disposal Section responsible for bomb and mine clearance work.

== George Cross ==
Southwell was part of a team tackling an unexploded parachute mine on 17 October 1940 during the height of the blitz in Hoxton in the East End of London.

Along with and his companion, Sub-Lieutenant Jack Easton, they were called to a mine in Clifton Street, Shoreditch. The street was deserted and the 1,500 pounds (680 kg) mine could be seen dangling from its parachute, wrapped round the chimney of a terraced house.

The pair had to climb through a window into the bedroom, as the mine was blocking the door wedged between a bedstead and the collapsing chimney. Easton set about defusing the mine with Southwell passing him tools through the window. They were working in this way when the rest of the chimney collapsed, setting off the fuse which began to tick. They ran for cover in a nearby air raid shelter but the mine exploded, destroying six surrounding streets and killing Southwell instantly.

Such was the damage that his body was undiscovered for a further six weeks.

Sub-Lieutenant Easton survived and both men were awarded the George Cross.

In October 1941 his widow Marion Southwell was presented with the George Cross by the King.

=== Citation ===
Southwell's George Cross citation appeared in the London Gazette on 23 January 1941:

The King has been graciously pleased to approve the posthumous award of the George Cross for great gallantry and undaunted devotion to duty, to
Ordinary Seaman Bennett Southwell, P/JX.204557.

== Theft of medal ==
In 1945, Southwell's George Cross medal was stolen from a fete held by Southwell's former employer, the hosiery manufacturer N. Corah & Sons, who had a replica produced and presented to the family.

In 2003 the original medal appeared for sale as part of a private collection. A member of Southwell's family informed the police and the sale was stopped. The medal was then purchased from the Magor Collection and is now with the family of Southwell.

== See also ==
- List of George Cross recipients
