= Xylo (disambiguation) =

Xylø is an American singer.

Xylo may also refer to:

- Mahindra Xylo, an Indian compact MPV
- Scott Xylo, British producer and songwriter
- Xylobands, a brand of radio frequency-receiving light-up wristbands
