= Jack Easton (Royal Navy officer) =

Recipient of the George Cross (1906–1944)

Jack Maynard Cholmondeley Easton
- Born: 28 May 1906; Maidenhead, Berkshire
- Died: 29 November 1994 (aged 88); Chichester, Sussex
- Military career
- Allegiance: United Kingdom
- Branch: Royal Naval Volunteer Reserve
- Service years: 1939–1945
- Rank: Lieutenant
- Commands: HM MMS 22 (1943–44)
- Conflicts: Second World War
- Awards: George Cross

Jack Maynard Cholmondeley Easton, GC (28 May 1906 – 29 November 1994) was an officer of the Royal Naval Volunteer Reserve (RNVR) who was awarded the George Cross for gallantry in defusing a parachute mine at Hoxton, the East End of London, during the Blitz on 17 October 1940. Notice of his award appeared in the London Gazette on 23 January 1941.

== Early life and career ==
Easton was born 28 May 1906, son of Percy and Kathleen Easton. He was educated at Brighton College and Pangbourne College, and was a solicitor by profession, entering the family firm, William Easton & Sons.

== Second World War ==
As a RNVR sub-lieutenant, he had been trained in naval ordnance disposal. The Luftwaffe had started dropping parachute adapted naval mines, with variable fusing. Naval disposal teams were detailed to deal with these. Easton, with his assistant Bennett Southwell attempted to defuse a mine suspended inside a damaged house. When the fusing engaged, the two men evacuated the house, but were caught by the explosion. Easton was seriously wounded, and Southwell killed, both being later awarded the George Cross.

Later in the war Jack Easton skippered armed trawlers and minesweepers.

== Personal life ==
In 1929, Easton married Felicity Field; they had a daughter, Juliet. In later life he married a cousin, Joan Bartman. Aged 88, Easton died in Chichester, Sussex.
