= Ruth Wills =

English poet (1826–1908)

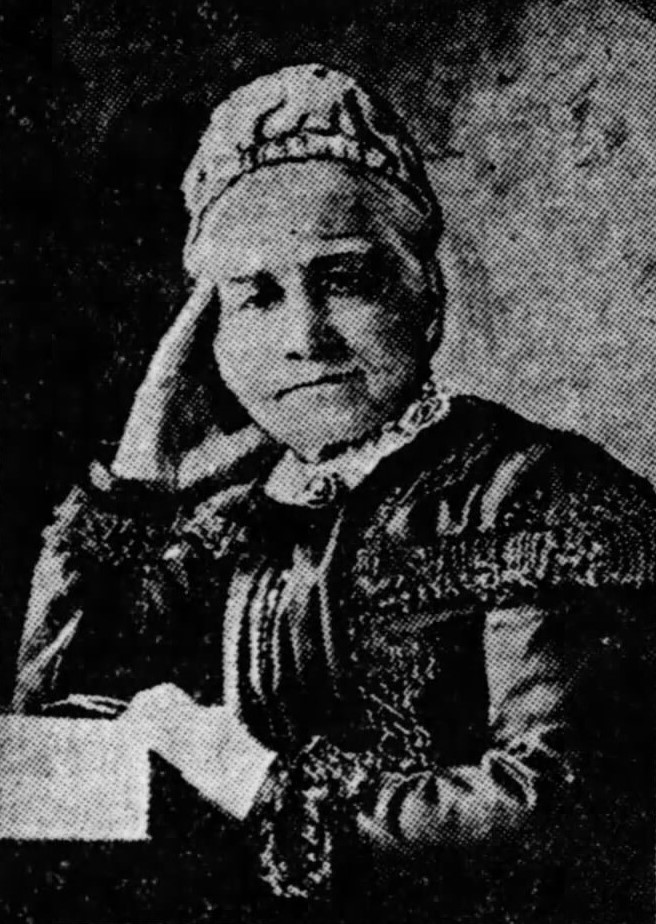
- Born: 22 December 1826 Leicester, England
- Died: 18 November 1908 (aged 81) Leicester, England
- Occupation: Poet; Factory worker

Ruth Wills (22 December 1826 – 18 November 1908) was an English poet and factory worker.

== Biography ==
Wills was born 22 December, 1826 in Leicester. Her mother, Susannah Wills, was a framework knitter and her father, Joseph Wills, had served in the army. As an infant she suffered from a paralytic stroke causing a lifelong disability. Her father died when she was seven, forcing her to work long hours to support her mother's small income. In 1837, when she was eleven, she began working at N. Corah & Sons’ hosiery factory on Union Street in Leicester where she continued to work until her retirement.

Wills attended a dame school for two years and a sunday school. Her parents were illiterate but she learned to read and became a keen reader of books. She later learnt to read French and German. As a teenager she had her first poem published in Children's Magazine.

Will's poetry was published in Leicester newspapers. In 1861 her first collection of poems was published, titled Lays of Lowly Life. In 1868 a second volume was published, titled Lays of Lowly Life: Second Series, which included a number of poems on slavery and the oppression of women.

In later life Wills worked as a foreman and manager at the factory. Wills died 18 November 1908 at home in Leicester at the age of 81.

== Publications ==
- Wills, Ruth (1861). Lays of Lowly Life. London: Simpkin, Marshall, and Co.
- ————— (1868). Lays of Lowly Life: Second Series. London: James Nisbet & Co.
