= BAPS Shri Swaminarayan Mandir London =

Hindu temple

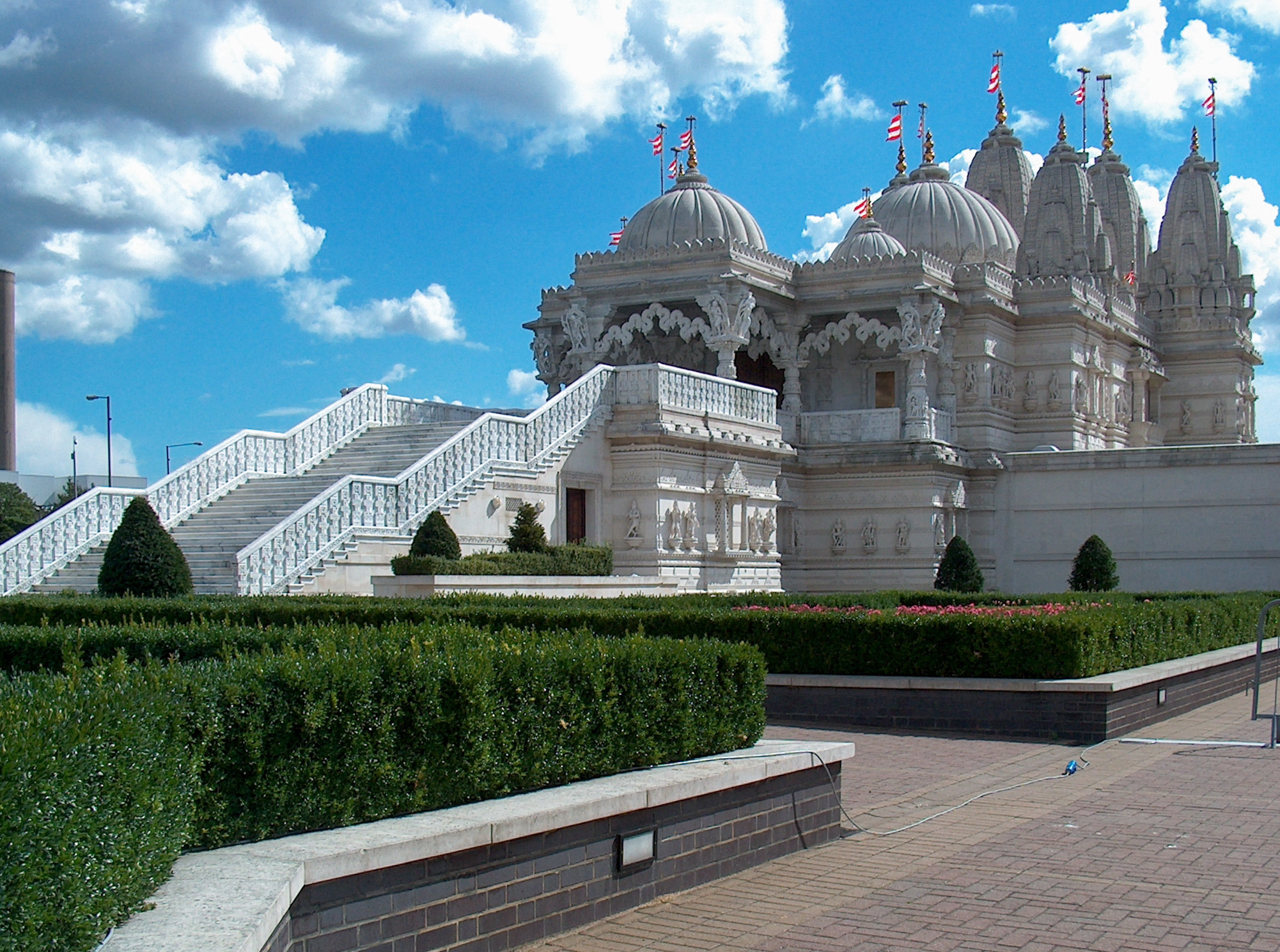
- BAPS Shri Swaminarayan Mandir

- Location in Greater London

Religion
- Affiliation: Hinduism
- Deity: Swaminarayan, Radha-Krishna, Rama-Sita, Shiva-Parvati

Location
- Location: Neasden, London, NW10
- Country: United Kingdom
- Coordinates: 51°32′51″N 0°15′42″W

Architecture
- Type: North Indian
- Creator: Pramukh Swami Maharaj / BAPS
- Established: 1982 (in Neasden)
- Completed: 20 August 1995

Website
- http://londonmandir.baps.org/

BAPS Shri Swaminarayan Mandir (also commonly known as the Neasden Temple) is a Hindu temple in Neasden, London, England. Built entirely using traditional methods and materials, the Swaminarayan mandir has been described as being Britain's first authentic Hindu temple. It was also Europe's first traditional Hindu stone temple, as distinct from converted secular buildings. It is a part of the Bochasanwasi Shri Akshar Purushottam Swaminarayan Sanstha (BAPS) organisation and was inaugurated in 1995 by Pramukh Swami Maharaj. The temple complex also consists of a permanent exhibition entitled "Understanding Hinduism" and a cultural centre housing an assembly hall, gymnasium, bookshop, and offices.

== Mandir complex ==
The BAPS Shri Swaminarayan Mandir is located on Pramukh Swami Road, Neasden, London. The mandir is close to the North Circular Road, and can be reached by bus or on foot from Wembley Park, Stonebridge Park, Harlesden, and Neasden Underground and Overground stations. The complex is 102,018 square feet and includes the first traditional stone mandir in Europe adjoined with a cultural center, and a 550-car parking lot. At the time of its completion, the mandir became the largest Hindu mandir built outside of India. The cultural center includes a foyer, a prayer hall, a conference hall, an exhibition hall, a marriage hall, a sports hall, a library, and a health clinic.

In August 2020, to commemorate the 25th anniversary of the mandir's opening, King Charles III and Queen Camilla said that, "the first of its kind outside India, Neasden Temple serves the local community as a place of worship, learning, celebration, peace and community service." The King and Queen had previously visited the temple in 2009 for the traditional festival of Holi.

=== Main structure ===
The mandir rises to a height of 21 meters (70 feet) and is 60 meters (195 feet) long. The exterior of the mandir covered with 990 cubic meters (35,000 cubic feet) of Bulgarian limestone, while the interior of the mandir is composed of 700 cubic meters (25,000 cubic feet) of Indian and Italian marble. The mandir covers 1.5 acres of land and is made up of over 1,699 cubic meters (60,000 cubic feet) of stone, without the use of ferrous materials like steel. The mandir includes 7 shikhars (pinnacles), 6 gummats (domes), 193 sthambhas (pillars), 32 gavakshas (windows), and 4 jharukhas (balconies). The central dome is 10 meters high and the design was inspired by the Delwara Jain Mandir in Mount Abu, Rajasthan. The mandir has over 500 unique designs, 26,300 carved stone pieces, and 55 different ceiling designs. In its September 2000 edition, the National Geographic referred to the mandir as "A London Landmark."

=== Haveli ===
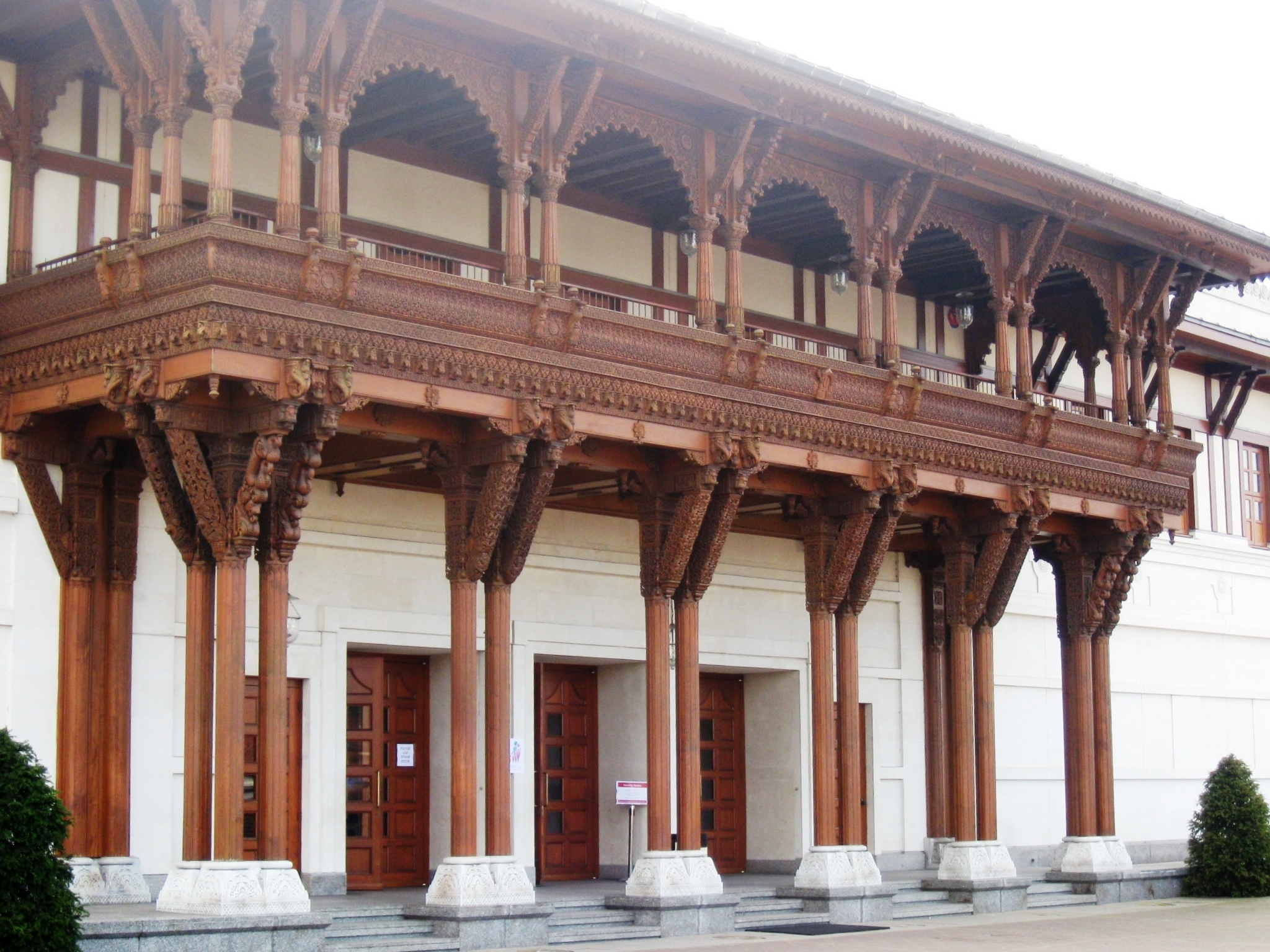
Haveli (a multi-function cultural centre)

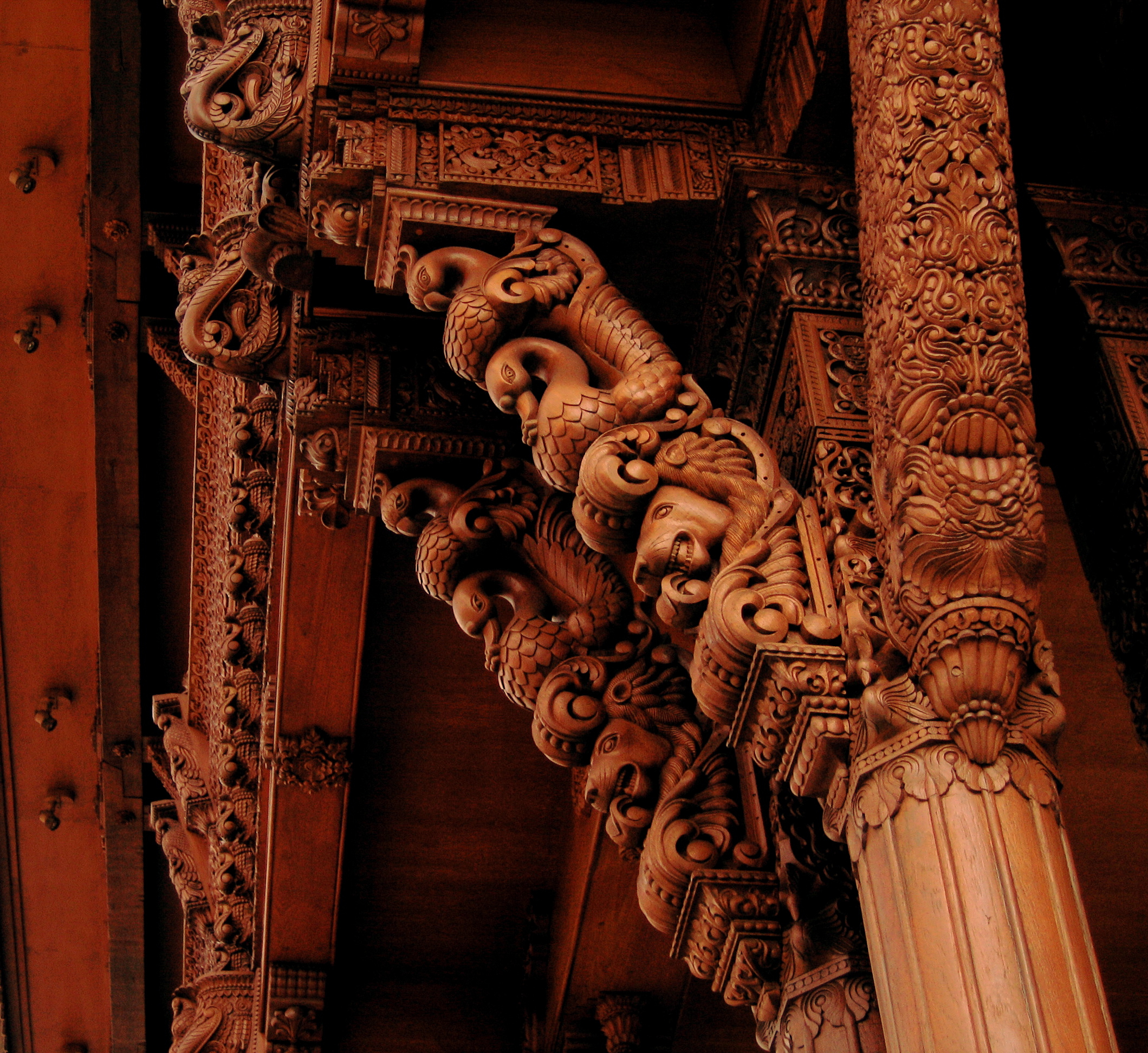
Carvings on the Haveli

The haveli, built in a traditional haveli style, has a courtyard architectural style that was originally developed in 17th century western India, and serves as a cultural center for the mandir. The traditional haveli design highlights specific architectural components like the façade, open courtyards, carved columns, arches, doors, windows, and balconies.

Adjoining the mandir is BAPS Shri Swaminarayan Haveli, a multi-function cultural centre. Whereas the mandir is carved from stone, the haveli is constructed from wood. English oak and Burmese teak have been fashioned into panels, arches and screens, all carved by craftsmen in India with a cornucopia of geometric patterns, stylised animal heads, and flower garlands.

The Burmese teak used was harvested from sustainable forests. To compensate for the 226 English oak trees used, over 2,300 English oak saplings were planted in Devon. The haveli also incorporates energy-saving features such as light-wells.

Richly carved haveli-style woodwork from Gujarat is the most striking characteristic of the building's façade and foyer. It has been designed according to traditional Indian haveli architecture, to evoke feelings of being in Gujarat, India, where such havelis were once commonplace. It required over 150 craftsmen from India three years to carve 1,579 m^{2} (17,000 square feet) of wood. Behind the traditional wooden façade, the cultural centre houses a vast pillarless prayer hall with space for 3,000 people, a gymnasium, medical centre, dining facilities, bookstall, conference facilities, and offices.

=== Garden ===
The mandir is surrounded by a garden featuring sculpted flowerbeds, lush lawns, evergreen yews, and a topiary. The garden displays two distinct styles to illustrate Hindu motifs. The parterre garden style is used on the front and sides of the mandir. The formal garden is planted behind the mandir and includes interconnected walkways and floral designs to symbolize the human relationship with nature and the universe.

The garden won first place in the 'Brent in Bloom' competition in 2009, 2010, and 2012 and received a Certificate of Excellence in 2009 from 'London in Bloom.'

=== Exhibition ===
The lower level of the mandir consists of a permanent exhibition open to visitors called 'Understanding Hinduism.' The exhibition spans over 3,000 square feet and is designed to display Hindu values and wisdom through 3D dioramas, paintings, tableaux, and traditional artwork. The exhibition also includes an 11-minute documentary that explains the religious significance of the mandir and how it was created.

== Construction ==
Fifteen years prior to its construction, Pramukh Swami Maharaj envisioned that a traditional Hindu mandir would be built in the UK for its followers. The mandir was built in accordance with the principles of the Shilpa Shastras, a Vedic text on architecture that dates back to approximately 5,000 years ago. Pramukh Swami Maharaj appointed CB Sompura, an Indian architect, as the lead architect for creating the design for the mandir. Prior to being used in construction, all of the stones were tested for properties such as density, compression, flexibility, water absorption, and freezing before being chosen. Planning permissions were obtained in August 1992, and the construction of the mandir began in November 1992. The Italian marble used for the interior of the mandir was sent to Kandla, India, to be carved by craftsmen and then shipped to London, UK to be assembled, "like a giant jigsaw to form the temple."

In December 1993, 169 craftsmen began working together across five different sites in India (Uttar Pradesh, Gujarat, Maharashtra, Rajasthan, and Bengal) to create the carved designs seen in the haveli. The haveli work of about 9,000 square feet was completed in 1 year and 8 months. The intricate designs in and around the haveli are carved on Burmese Teak wood and structurally supported by English Oak wood, both of which have been preserved in their natural colors.

Initially, while planning for the cultural center, architects proposed four architectural designs to Pramukh Swami Maharaj: the Jaipur palace style, the Jaisalmer arcade, the Raj Indo-British style, and the haveli style. The architects predominately favored the Raj or Jaipur styles, but Pramukh Swami Maharaj preferred the haveli style and approved the corresponding designs. Chief architect for the haveli, Nigel Lane, a recipient of the BBC TV Pride of Place, was a key British architect who assisted BAPS in tailoring the Haveli architectural style to suit the British climate.

Approximately 450 craftsmen, 100 full-time volunteers, and over 1,000 part-time volunteers dedicated time and effort toward the creation of the mandir. Volunteers often devoted time from their day jobs to help with the construction of the mandir and ensure its completion by 1995. Volunteer tasks varied and included cleaning the site, performing electrical work, cementing and concreting, plumbing and drainage work, fixing windows and transporting materials. In addition to construction efforts, volunteers also organized fundraising initiatives. The aluminum can recycle project was recognized with the 1995 Brent Green Leaf Award for recycling over 7 million aluminum cans. Construction of the mandir complex was completed in 1995.

== History ==
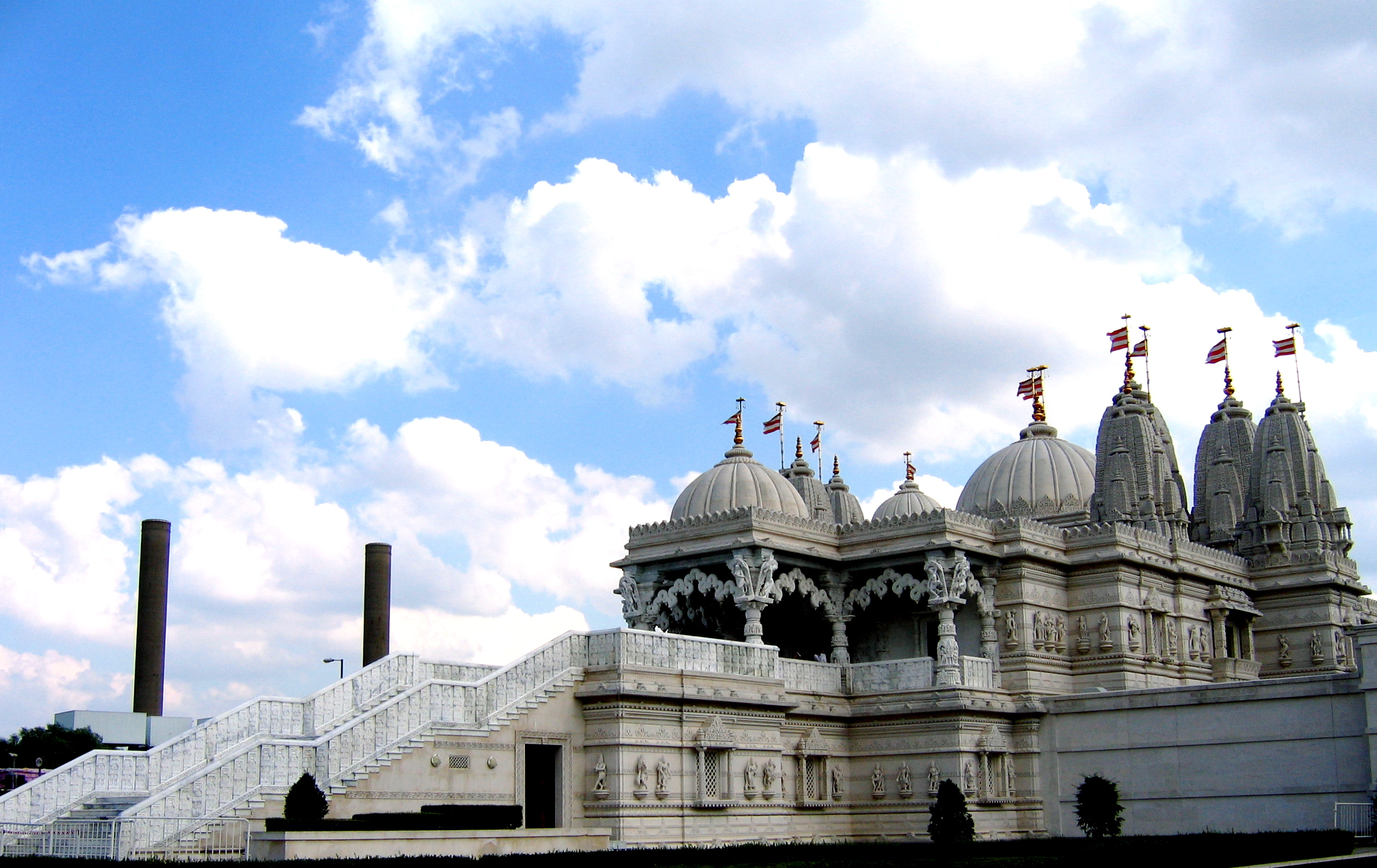
BAPS Shri Swaminarayan Mandir, London

The mandir and haveli were built and funded entirely by the Hindu community, and the entire project spanned five years, although the construction itself was completed in two-and-a-half years. Building work began in August 1992. On 24 November 1992, the temple recorded the biggest-ever concrete-pour in the UK, when 4,500 tons were laid in 24 hours to create a foundation mat 6 ft (1.8m) thick. The first stone was laid in June 1993; two years later, the building was complete.

The mandir was cited in Guinness World Records 2000 as follows:

"Biggest Hindu Temple outside India: The Shri Swaminarayan Temple in Neasden, London, UK, is the largest Hindu temple outside India. It was built by Pramukh Swami, a 92-year-old Indian sadhu, and is made of 2,828 tonnes of Bulgarian limestone and 2,000 tonnes of Italian marble, which was first shipped to India to be carved by a team of 1,526 sculptors. The temple cost £12 million to build."

Since 2000, it has been surpassed in size by other BAPS mandirs elsewhere.

=== Overview ===
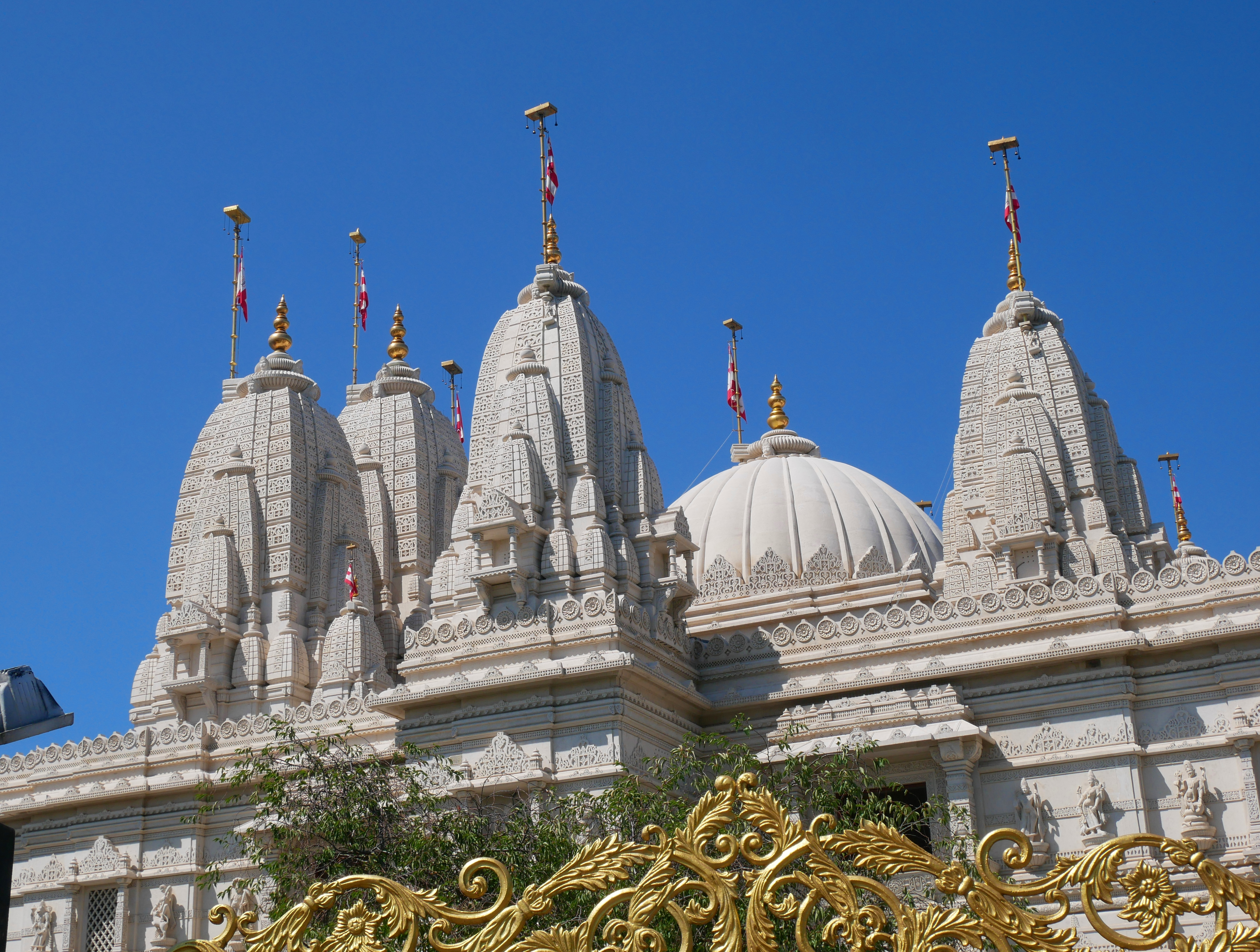
The east face of the mandir

- June 1970: the first BAPS Swaminarayan Mandir in the UK was opened in a converted disused church in Islington, North London, by Yogiji Maharaj.
- 1982: having outgrown the temple, the congregation moved from the Islington temple to a small, former warehouse in Neasden.
- 1990: BAPS was again in search of a building that could cope with the growing congregation, and plans for the present temple were made.
- 1995: they moved to their present temple, built on the site of a disused truck warehouse opposite the previous temple. The old temple building was retained and converted into Shayona, an Indian grocery shop and vegetarian restaurant.

== The Swaminarayan School ==
Opposite the Mandir there used to be The Swaminarayan School, Europe's first independent Hindu school. Founded in 1992 by Pramukh Swami Maharaj, it followed the National Curriculum, while promoting aspects of Hinduism and Hindu culture, such as dance, music and language. The school's premises formerly housed Sladebrook High School, which closed in 1990.

The 2007 GCSE results placed the school fourth among all independent schools in the country. On June 25, 2018, the school publicly announced that it would be shutting down. The school formally shut down on 31 August 2021.

== Awards and recognition ==
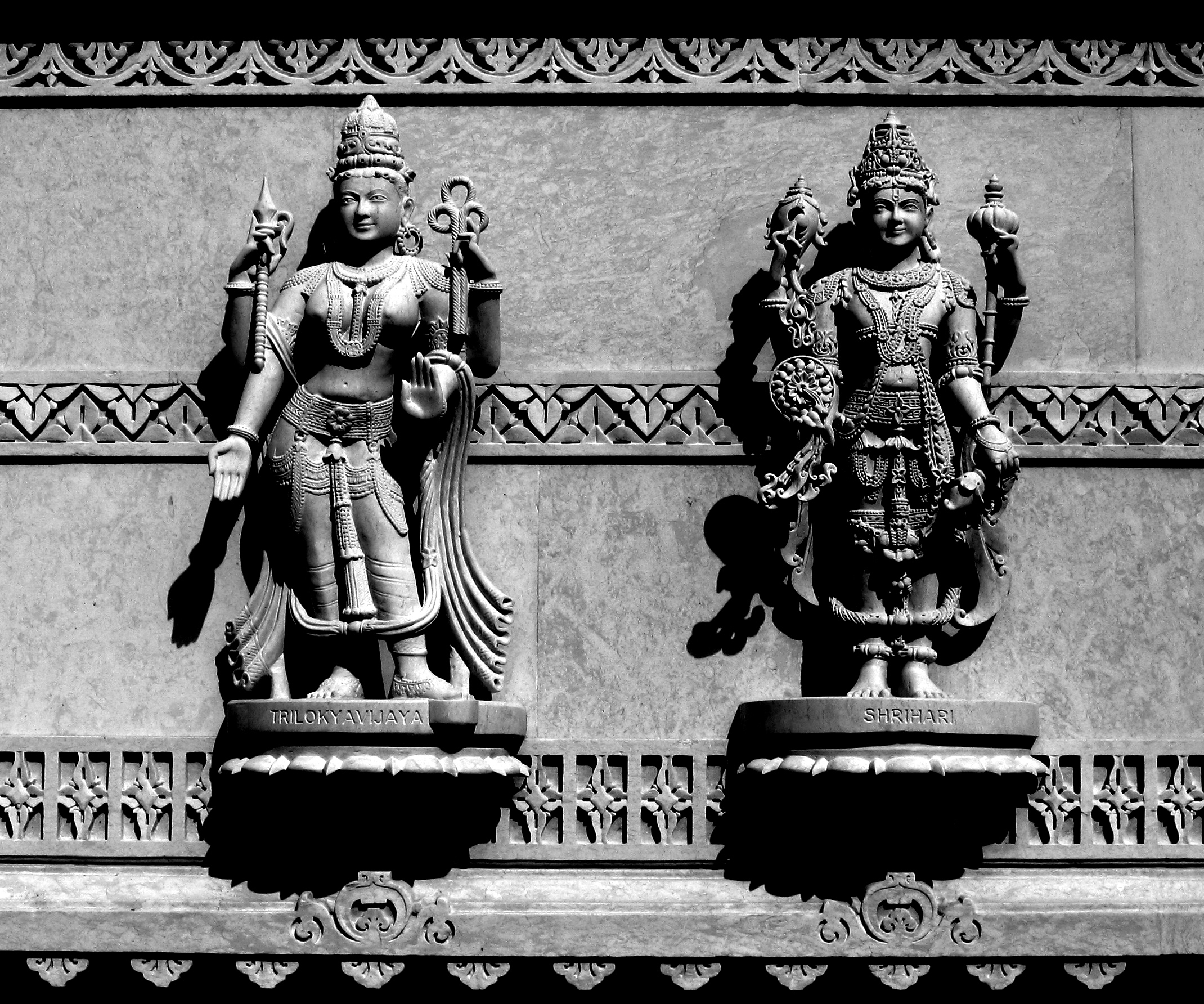

Pride of Place Award

The Mandir was awarded the 'UK Pride of Place' award in December 2007 by Government authorities after a nationwide online poll.

Seven wonders of London

Time Out declared the Mandir as one of the "Seven Wonders of London". In an "epic series... to pay tribute to... the capital's seven most iconic buildings and landmarks", they embarked upon an ambitious search of London's best.

Guinness World Records

In 2000, Guinness World Records presented two certificates to recognise the world record of offering 1,247 vegetarian dishes during the Annakut Festival held at the Shri Swaminarayan Mandir, London on 27 October 2000, and secondly to recognise the largest traditionally built Hindu temple outside India.

The Eventful 20th Century – 70 Wonders of the Modern World

Reader's Digest (1998) featured the Shri Swaminarayan Mandir lauding its scale, intricate detail and the extraordinary story of how it was built and inspired by Pramukh Swami Maharaj.

Royal Commission on the Historical Monuments of England

The 1997/8 Annual Report of the Royal Commission on the Historical Monuments of England, featured the Mandir, and referred to as a "modern building of major importance in our multicultural society".

Most Enterprising Building Award

The Most Enterprising Building Award 1996 was awarded by the Royal Fine Art Commission & British Sky Broadcasting to the Swaminarayan Mandir in London on 5 June 1996.

Natural Stone Award

The Stone Federation issued a special award to the Swaminarayan Hindu Mandir in 1995 as part of its Natural Stone Awards.

Visit from King Charles III and Queen Camilla on its 30th anniversary

On 29 October 2025, King Charles III and Queen Camilla visited Neasden Temple to commemorate its 30th anniversary.

== See also ==
- Hinduism in England
- Shree Sanatan Hindu Mandir
