= Hinduism in England =

Historical Population
Year	Pop.	±%
2001	546,982	—
2011	806,199	+47.4%
2021	1,020,533	+26.6%
Religious Affiliation was not recorded prior to 2001.

Hinduism in England is the third largest religion in the country, with over 1,020,533 followers as of the 2021 census. This represents over 1.8% of the English population, up from 1.5% in 2011 and 1.1% in 2001. Hindus are predominantly in the cities of London and Leicester, where they make up greater proportions of the population. England has a number of Hindu temples, including the Hindu temple at Neasden which is a large Hindu temple in Europe. In 2007, the largest Hindu Mandir in the North of England, the Bradford Lakshmi Narayan Hindu Temple opened in Bradford, West Yorkshire.

== History ==
Hinduism has been in England since the early 19th century. Occasionally there were Hindu scholars, philosophers, reformers and also visitors from the princely states of India. Raja Ram Mohan Roy (born in India in 1772) was founder of a Hindu reform movement in India. He was in England in 1829 to visit his Christian friends. He also had audience with King William IV. Roy died in Stapleton, Bristol four years later.

The orientalist and reformer Sir R.G. Bhandarkar visited London in 1874. In 1879 Aurobindo went to England as a boy with his two brothers to study, living in Manchester, London (St. Paul's School) and Cambridge (King's College) where he stayed until 1893. Swami Vivekananda visited England in 1895 and 1896, having addressed the World's Parliament of Religions in Chicago in 1893. In England Vivekananda's talk on Hindu philosophy and particularly on Vedanta deeply influenced Miss Margaret Elizabeth Noble, who was later known as Sister Nivedita.

Early Hindus in England were usually students. Rabindranath Tagore (later a Nobel Laureate) went to England in 1878, returning to India in 1880. Fifty years later Tagore was at Oxford delivering Hibbert Lectures (1930) on the Religion of Man. Ramanujan, a mathematical genius and an orthodox Hindu, spent almost five years (1914–19) at Cambridge University. Professor Sir Sarvepalli Radhakrishnan was Spalding Professor of Eastern Religions and Ethics at the University of Oxford from 1939 until 1952. Hinduism had already received widespread attention in the Victorian era largely due to the work of the Theosophical Society and emergence of the new field, Indology. In 1878 Max Muller, an Indologist, delivered inaugural Hibbert Lectures at Oxford on the Religions of India.

In 1929 Dr. Hari Prasad Shastri (1882-1956), who was a highly learned teacher (Acharya) of Adhyatma Yoga in India, went to England having taught for many years in Japan at Imperial and Waseda Universities and then in China also as a professor of philosophy. Hari Prasad Shastri founded Shanti Sadan (temple of inner peace) in London. Trevor Leggett, an English Judo teacher, met Shastri in 1936. He was deeply influenced by Hari Prasad Shastri's yoga teachings.

In 1935 Paramahansa Yogananda visited England, returning from the USA. In London he addressed a large meeting at Caxton Hall introduced by Sir Francis Younghusband. He again visited England in 1936 addressing more meetings and especially a large gathering at Whitefield Congregational Church, organised by the British National Council of the World Fellowship of Faiths. A Self-Realization Fellowship Centre in London was formed after Yogananda's departure. In his autobiography Yogananda commented that the 'English tenacity has an admirable expression in a spiritual relationship'.

There have been three waves of migration of Hindus to England. The first wave was before India's Independence in 1947. Before the Second World War Hindu migration to England was minuscule and largely temporary. During the post-war era, economic conditions compelled many Indians including Hindus to leave their country in search of better opportunities. The fact that Indians, as Commonwealth citizens, didn't require a visa to enter or live in the United Kingdom was a factor. In the early 1960s, in order to save the NHS, the Conservative Health Minister The Rt Hon Enoch Powell recruited a large number of doctors including Hindus from the Indian sub-continent

The second wave of migration occurred in the 1970s after Idi Amin's expulsion of Gujarati and other Asians (who were British Overseas Citizens) from Uganda. Initially, Hindu Immigration was limited to Punjabis and Gujaratis. Later Hindu communities from other regions of the Indian sub-continent and countries like Guyana, Trinidad and Tobago, Mauritius and Fiji could be found in England.

The last wave of migration began in the 1990s with two types of people settling in England – Tamil refugees from Sri Lanka and professionals including doctors and software engineers from India.

Leicester's Chanda Vyas became the first female Hindu priest, or purohita, to conduct ceremonies including weddings and funerals, in the United Kingdom, conducting ceremonies in both the English and Gujarati languages.

== Demographics ==
=== Geographical Distribution ===
According to the 2011 Census of England, there are some 806,199 Hindus living there. The two major cities of Hindus are London and Leicester. Within London, Hinduism is found in Brent and Harrow where Hindus make up a fifth of the population, and to a lesser extent, in Southall, Hounslow, Ilford, East Ham, Croydon, Hendon, and Wembley. Outside London, Leicester has a significant concentration of Hindus, largely from East Africa and India, with over 45,000 living in the city.

British Hindus by English Region
Region	2021		2011		2001	
Region	Number	%	Number	%	Number	%
Greater London	453,034	5.1%	411,291	5.0%	291,977	4.1%
South East	154,748	1.7%	92,499	1.1%	44,575	0.6%
East Midlands	120,345	2.5%	89,723	2.0%	66,710	1.6%
West Midlands	88,116	1.5%	72,247	1.3%	56,668	1.1%
East	86,631	1.4%	54,010	0.9%	31,386	0.6%
North West	49,749	0.7%	38,259	0.5%	27,211	0.4%
Yorkshire and the Humber	29,243	0.5%	24,074	0.5%	15,797	0.3%
South West	27,746	0.5%	16,324	0.3%	8,288	0.2%
North East	10,924	0.4%	7,772	0.3%	4,370	0.2%
England	1,020,533	1.8%	806,199	1.5%	546,982	1.1%

=== Ethnic group ===
British Hindus by Ethnic group
Ethnic group	2001		2011		2021	
Ethnic group	Number	%	Number	%	Number	%
Asian	528,521	96.62	771,496	95.70	954,900	93.57
– Indian	462,097	84.48	613,802	76.14	846,412	79.62
– Bangladeshi	1,686	0.31	3,966	0.49	6,165	0.60
– Pakistani	540	0.10	3,848	0.48	1,391	0.14
– Chinese	151	0.03	2,798	0.35	328	0.03
– Other Asian	64,047	11.71	147,082	18.24	158,435	15.52
White	6,947	1.27	11,601	1.44	6,455	0.63
– British	5,552	1.02	6,552	0.81	4,795	0.47
– Irish	144	0.03	272	0.03	193	0.02
– Gypsy and Irish Traveller			98	0.01	83	0.01
– Roma					58	0.01
– Other White	1,251	0.23	4,679	0.58	1,326	0.13
Mixed	5,647	1.03	9,636	1.20	10,794	1.06
– White and Asian	3,460	0.63	6,311	0.78	7,854	0.77
– White and Black Caribbean	141	0.03	385	0.05	206	0.02
– White and Black African	166	0.03	333	0.04	205	0.02
– Other Mixed	1,880	0.34	2,607	0.32	2,529	0.25
Black	2,968	0.54	5,414	0.67	1,887	0.18
– African	984	0.18	1,856	0.23	705	0.07
– Caribbean	1,639	0.30	1,314	0.16	783	0.08
– Other Black	345	0.06	2,244	0.28	399	0.04
Other	2,899	0.53	8,052	1.00	47,400	4.54
– Arab			1,025	0.13	103	0.01
– Other Ethnic group	2,899	0.53	7,027	0.87	46,297	4.53
TOTAL	546,982	100.0	806,199	100.0	1,020,533	100.0

== Hindu organisations ==
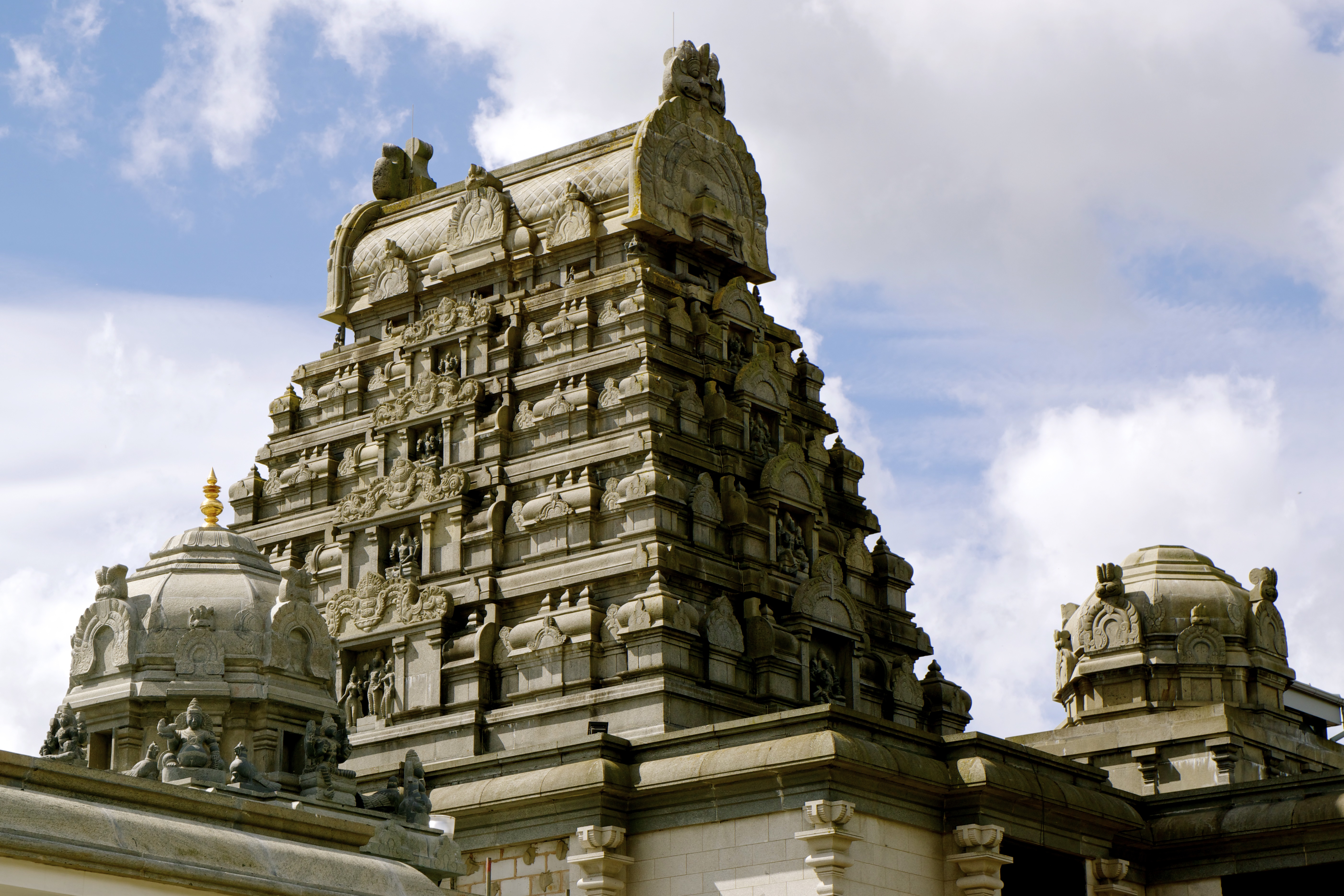
Gopuram and vimana at Shri Venkateswara (Balaji) Temple in Birmingham

Many regional umbrella organisations have been set up to bring local Hindu organisations in a town or region together to engage with local government. These include the Hindu Council of Brent, Hindu Council of Harrow, Hindu Council of Birmingham and the Hindu Council of the North.

At the more local level, Hindus have many organisations that are based on community or linguistic identities. They usually cater to the cultural and community needs of a particular Hindu denomination or sub-community. Examples of such organisations include the Arya Samaj, Brahmin Society North London, Shree Kutch Leva Patel Community, Great Prajapati Association, International Punjabi Society, South Indian Association, Maharashtra Mandal of London and many others. They usually operate from own or rented premises and arrange large festivals and events, besides providing services to their communities, including religious discourses, match-making services, weddings and others.

There are a number of Hindu organisations that provide various services to different audiences in the fields of education, health care, counselling, advocacy and other areas. These include the Chinmaya Mission, which offers classes on the Hindu Scriptures, BAPS Swaminarayan Sanstha, Oxford Centre for Hindu Studies, ISKCON Educational Services, City Hindus Network, National Hindu Students' Forum (UK) and the International Swaminarayan Satsang Organisation.

== Temples ==
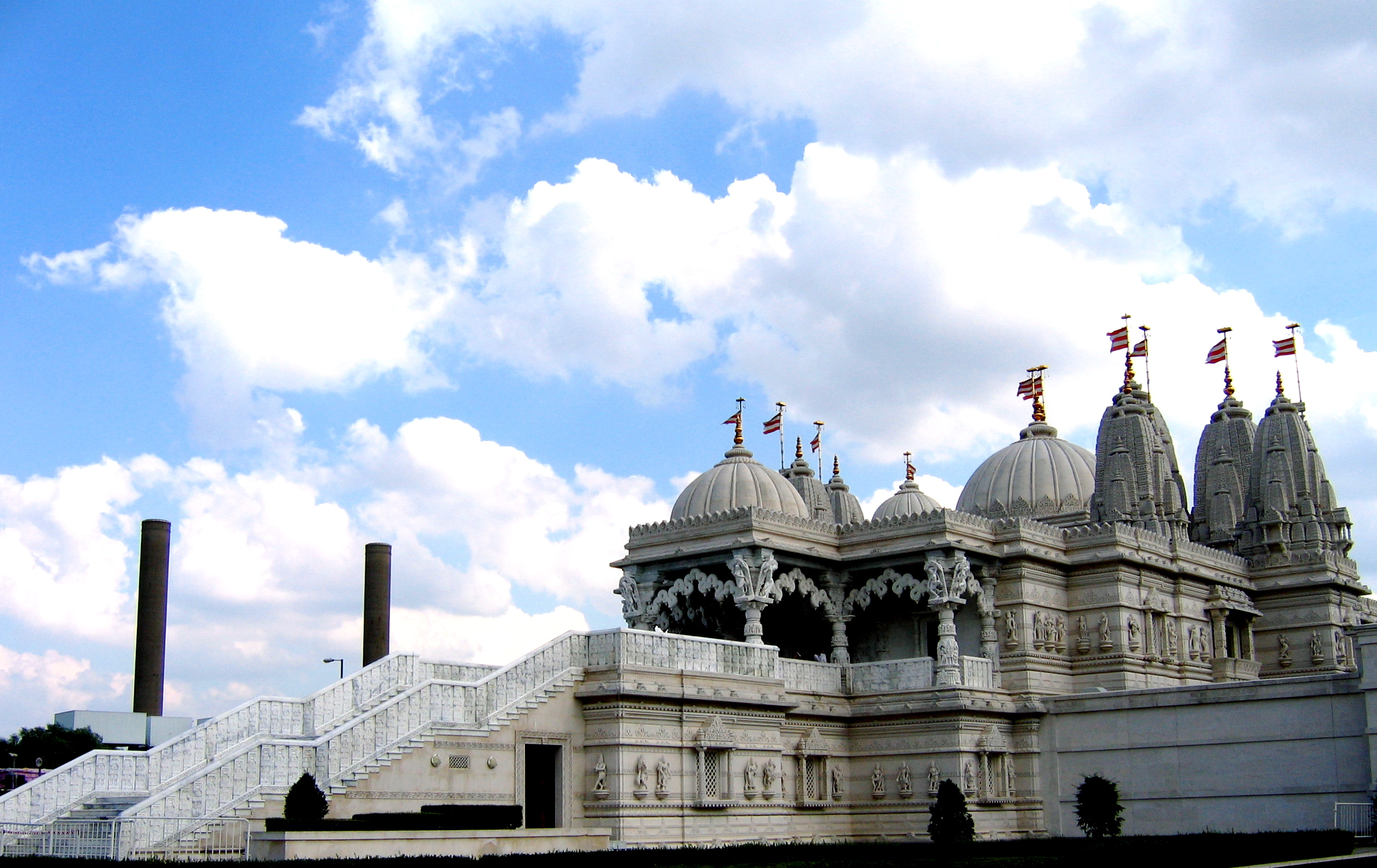
The Swaminarayan Temple at Neasden, London which is the largest Hindu Temple in Europe

There are over 150 Hindu temples in England which provide a wide range of services to different communities within the Hindu community. Some of the larger and more famous temples include the Swaminarayan Temple in Neasden, the Bhaktivedanta Manor (Hare Krishna) Temple in Letchmore Heath near Watford, the Balaji Temple in Birmingham, the Sanatan Mandir in Leicester, the Vishwa Hindu Mandir in Southall, the Murugan Temple in Manor Park and the Gujarat Hindu Society Krishna Temple in Preston. There are also 6 Shri Swaminarayan Temples in different areas of London, not to be confused with the famous Swaminarayan Neasden Temple.

The temples are centres of excellence where the community regularly congregates to worship, learn and socialise. In addition to large festivals like the Janmashtami festival at Bhaktivedanta Manor which attracts 80,000 visitors or the Diwali festival at Neasden which attracts 50,000 people, many temples provide services like weddings, Hindu sacraments, language classes, further education, computer classes, yoga, counselling and various other services.

In 2008, a campaign was launched to raise funds to establish a temple to serve the 2,500 Hindus in Oxfordshire.

In 2020, Historic England (HE) published A Survey of Hindu Buildings in England with the aim of providing information about buildings that Hindus use in England so that HE can work with communities to enhance and protect those buildings now and in the future. The scoping survey identified 187 Hindu temples in England.

== Encyclopedia of Hinduism ==
The Encyclopedia of Hinduism was unveiled in October 2014 by the British Prime Minister David Cameron at a Diwali function held in London at the Queen Elizabeth II Conference Centre near Westminster. The function was hosted by Lord Andrew Feldman, the Chairman of the Conservative Party and attended by more than 1000 guests. PM Cameron and his wife Samantha lit a ceremonial diya at the event.

== Hindu schools ==
Krishna Avanti Primary School in Harrow is the first state-funded Hindu school in England was approved in 2005, to be run by the Avanti Schools Trust. Construction of the £10 Million Krishna Avanti Primary School in Edgware, north west London, began in 2008 with the first pupils starting later that year in temporary accommodation. In total there are 6 Hindu schools in England.

== See also ==
- Hinduism in the United Kingdom
- Hinduism in Northern Ireland
- Hinduism in Scotland
- Hinduism in Wales
- Sanskrit in the West
- Vedanga
- Hinduism in Vietnam
- Hinduism by country
- Oxford Centre for Hindu Studies
- List of Hindu festivals
- I-Foundation
- Hindu Organisations a Survey
- Religion in England
