= Fred Woods =

Fred or Frederick Woods may refer to:

- Frederick S. Woods (1864–1950), American mathematician
- Fred Woods (trade unionist) (died 1961), British trade union leader
- Fred Woods (historian) (born 1956), professor at Brigham Young University
- Frederick Newhall Woods IV (born c. 1952), kidnapper behind the 1976 Chowchilla kidnapping

== See also ==
- Fred Woods Trail, a hiking trail in Pennsylvania
