= Fred Wood (cyclist) =

Personal information
- Born: 1 March 1861 Rushden, Northamptonshire, England
- Died: 28 January 1935 (aged 73) South Shields, England

Cycling career
- Sport: Cycling

Fred Wood (1 March 1861 – 28 January 1935) was an English cyclist, one of the leading professional riders of the 1880s who became world penny-farthing champion.

== Career ==
Born in Rushden, Northamptonshire, Wood was a keen cyclist as a teenager, and moved to Leicester around 1878 and joined Leicester Cycling Club to take advantage of better facilities and stronger competition. He won a string of championships in the 1880s over distances ranging from one mile to fifty miles and set several record times.

His success inspired N. Corah & Sons of Leicester to produce the 'Fred Wood Champion Suit' for cyclists in 1883.

In 1886, Wood competed in the United States, winning a one mile professional race and a five mile handicap at Roseville, New Jersey.

By 1887 Wood was the World Penny Farthing Champion, and visited Australia and New Zealand during 1887 and 1888; At Ballarat in November Wood won the professional championship, and in New Zealand he set a world mile record of 2 minutes 50.6 seconds.

Wood moved to South Shields in 1888, where he went into business, becoming a licensed victualler. He became a local councillor for St. Hilda Ward in 1914. He set up the catering company Messrs. Johnson and Wood with Thomas Henry Johnson.

In 1891, Wood toured Britain, competing in events at various tracks.

On 26 January 1935, Wood suffered head injuries in a fall down cellar steps at the pub that he ran, The Mariner's Arms, and died two days later in the Ingham Infirmary aged 73; A coroner's inquest determined that the death was accidental.
