= The Voom Blooms =

English indie rock band

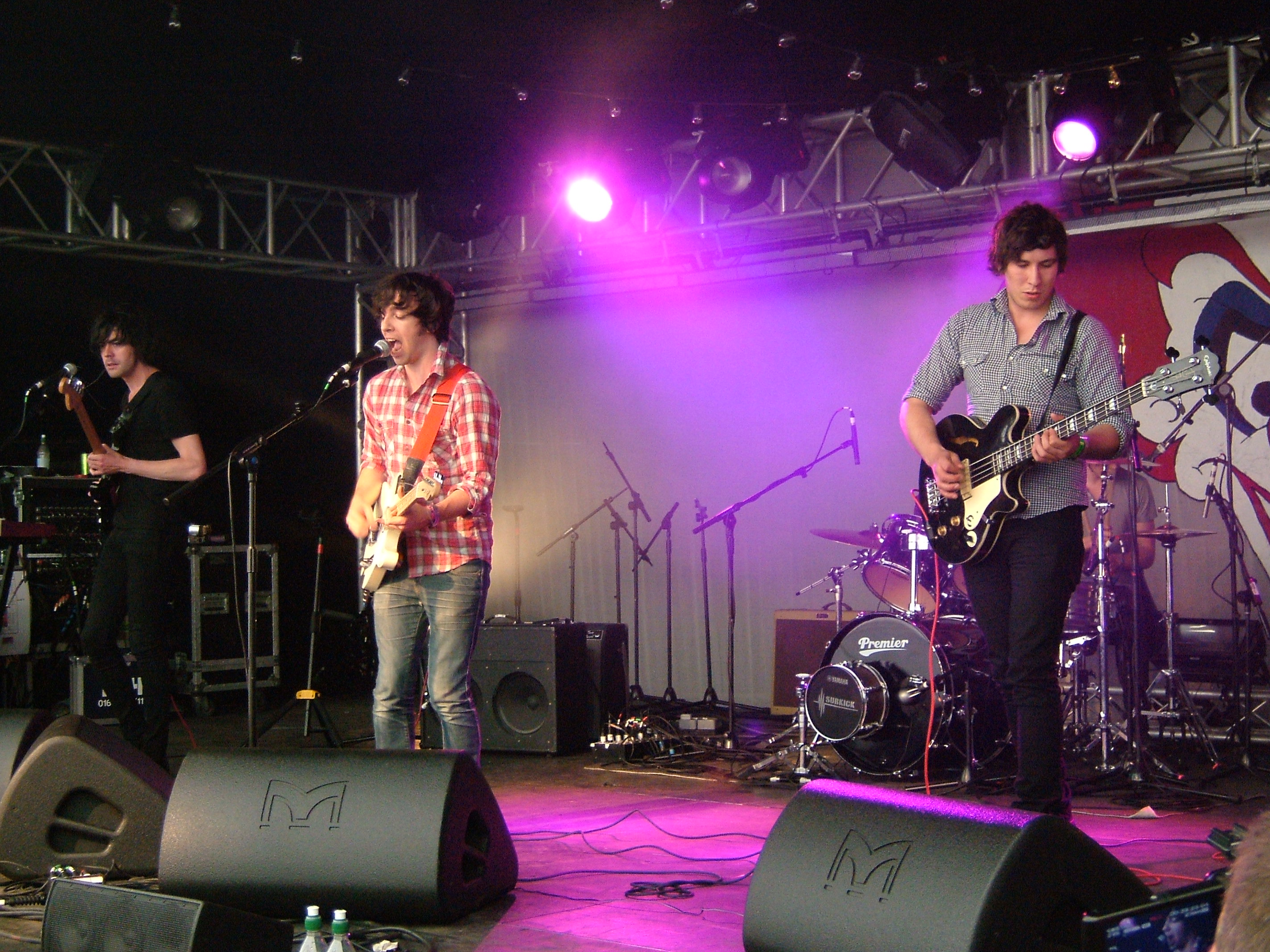
- Performing at Summer Sundae, 2008

Background information
- Origin: Loughborough, England, United Kingdom
- Genre: Indie rock
- Years active: 2005–2009
- Labels: Fiction; 23rd Recordings; Fabtone Records
- Past members: George Guildford; Thom Mackie; Craig Monk; Andy Wells; Brett Young; James Beasley
- Website: myspace.com/thevoomblooms

The Voom Blooms were an English indie rock band from Loughborough, England, consisting of George Guildford (guitar/vocals), Thom Mackie (drums), Craig Monk (guitar), and Andy Wells (bass).

== History ==
The group formed in July 2005, with Brett Young on bass, and recorded their first single, "Politics & Cigarettes" in autumn of that year. The BBC's Steve Lamacq championed the song on both his Radio 1 and BBC 6 Music radio programs, and the band won 'Fresh Meat' on Zane Lowe's Radio 1 show. The band also made the top 10 of Channel 4's 'Best New British Bands Showcase', receiving more than 24,000 votes. The single was released in March 2006, on Fiction Records, and sold out in less than a week, adding to the excitement of the band's spot on NME's club tour. The band was also announced in Rolling Stone magazine as one of the best new bands of 2006–2007. The band claim their name comes from a mis-heard line in a Japanese film. Their sound has been compared with Bloc Party, The Libertines and Interpol. After only eight gigs they headlined at Loughborough University to a crowd of over 500 people. The band signed a one single deal with Fiction Records, and the resulting single "Politics & Cigarettes" sold out within a week.

Having supported The Paddingtons, The Horrors, The View, Milburn, Larrikin Love, Babyshambles and Boy Kill Boy, and played at Manchester's In the City and Leicester's Summer Sundae festivals, The Voom Blooms have concentrated on recording their debut album. Brett Young left the band in January 2007, and is currently working on a new project.

The Voom Blooms performed their last gig, entitled Farewell at The Orange Tree, Loughborough, on 26 March 2009.

== Discography ==
=== Singles ===
- "Politics & Cigarettes" b/w "Thoughts of Rena" (Fiction Records, March 2006)
- "Anna" b/w "The Models of Soho" (23rd Recordings, September 2006)

=== EPs ===
- The London Heads (2006)
- Nine Ships (2007) – Japanese release

=== Songs ===
- "Politics & Cigarettes" (released on Fiction Records in March 2006)
- "The London Heads"
- "Thoughts of Rena"
- "Lovers"
- "Making Plans"
- "Aeroplanes at 3am"
- "Anna" (released on 23rd Recordings in September 2006)
- "The Models of Soho"
- "She's Leaving Soon"
- "By The Seashore (Let's Go Along)"
- "Astronauts"
- "On Holiday"
- "Nine Ships"
- "Moving To New York"
- "Sigrun Yr"
- "All Aboard The Albert"
- "Lucille"
