= Chanda Vyas =

British Hindu priest

Chanda Vyas (born 1952) is a British Hindu priest. She is Britain's first female Hindu priest.

== Biography ==
Vyas was born in 1952 in East Africa and is of Indian descent. She is from a Brahmin family, and her father, grandfather and great-grandfather were all Hindu priests.

Vyas is based in Leicester, Leicestershire, England, and worked as a social worker in the Health and Social Care department at Leicester City Council. Her roles at the council included supporting the elderly, those with mental health issues and individuals with learning disabilities.

Vyas became the first female Hindu priest, or purohita, to conduct ceremonies including weddings and funerals, in the United Kingdom; conducting ceremonies in both the English and Gujarati languages. She has officiated weddings for LGBTQ and interfaith couples, including the UK's first Hindu-Jewish lesbian wedding. She has said that: "Hinduism does not talk about body mates. It talks about soul mates." Vyas also conducted funerals online during the COVID-19 lockdowns.

Vyas is training other women to become priests. She has also raised awareness about the history and traditions of Diwali through the BBC Asian Network and tradition, change and the politics of gender at live events.

In 2023, Vyas was nominated for the BBC Radio Leicester's Make A Difference Award.

== Personal life ==
Vyas has three children.
