= Nathaniel Corah =

Trader of hosiery and textiles from Leicester, England

Nathaniel Corah (1777–1831) was a trader of hosiery and textiles from Leicester in England. He founded the firm N. Corah & Sons which became one of the most important textile manufacturers in the country.

Born in Barlestone, Leicestershire he trained as a framesmith and first produced garments on a knitting frame on his farm. An early textile business he formed folded with debts and this resulted in a brief prison sentence.

In 1815, upon his release from prison, he started a new business trading clothing items between Leicester and Birmingham. He would purchase locally produced textiles at The Globe public house on Silver Street and trade them in Birmingham. By 1824 his business had expanded and he was able to buy a block of buildings in Leicester's Union Street.

In the 1830s his sons John, William and Thomas joined the firm which became N. Corah & Sons Ltd. The Leicester-based company expanded over the next twenty years and this required moves firstly to a new premises on Granby Street and then to the famous St. Margaret's Works site, which opened on 13 July 1865. Such was the rapid growth of this company that by 1866 over one thousand people were employed at St. Margaret's Works.

Nathaniel Corah died on the 20 January 1831 after a brief illness.
