= Fred Thomas Wood =

Chilean footballer (1917-1994)

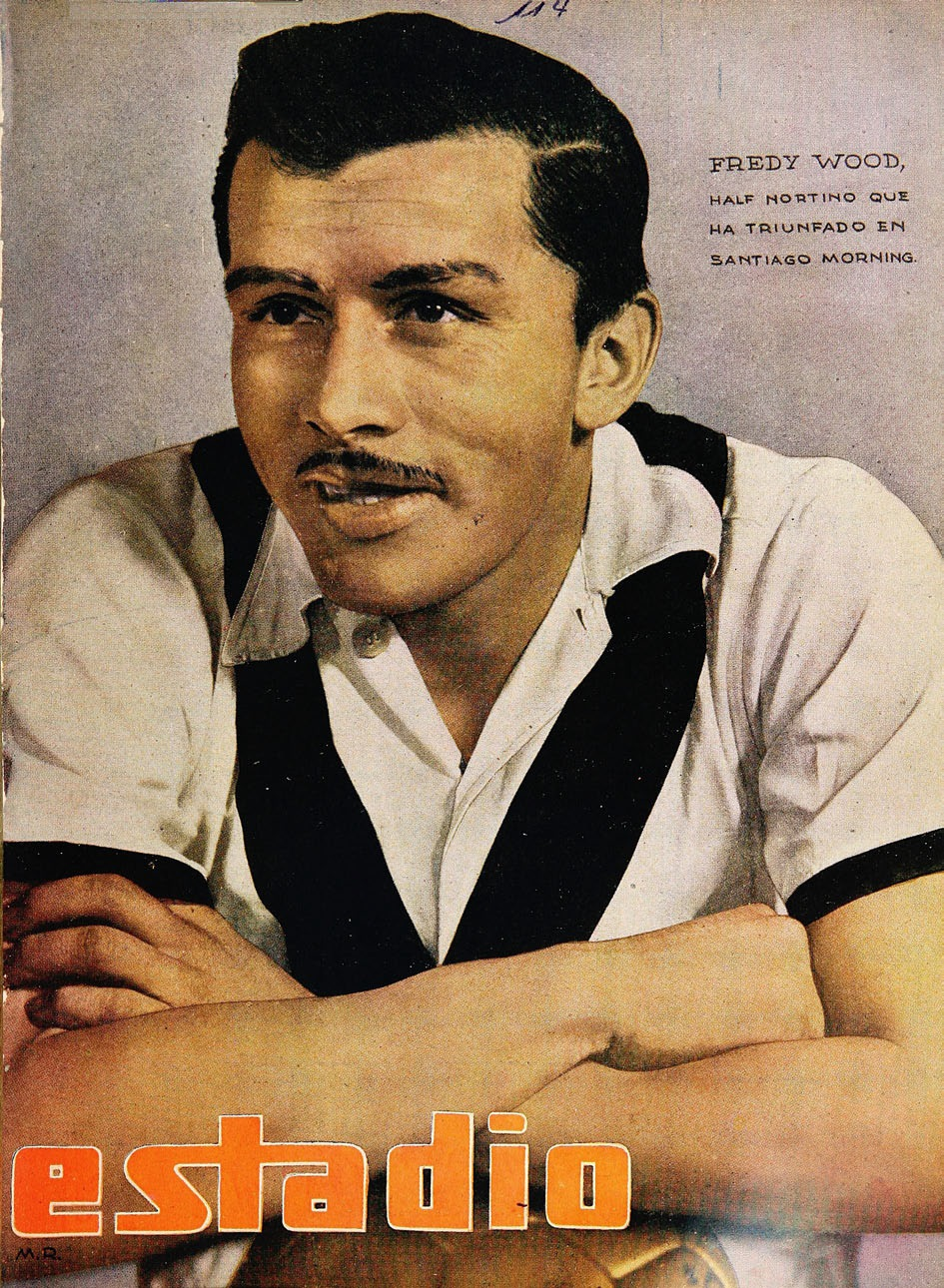

Personal information
- Date of birth: 21 December 1917
- Place of birth: Iquique, Chile
- Date of death: 22 September 1994 (aged 76)
- Position: Midfielder

International career
Years	Team	Apps	(Gls)
1947	Chile	2	(0)

Fred Thomas Wood (21 December 1917 – 22 September 1994) was a Chilean footballer. He played in two matches for the Chile national football team in 1947. He was also part of Chile's squad for the 1947 South American Championship.
