= Scott Xylo =

- Born: Shaquille Thompson; Leicester, UK
- Genres: Hip hop; Afrobeat; experimental; psychedelic funk
- Instrument(s): Bass, drum machine, synthesizer
- Years active: 2013–present
- Labels: Black Acre

Shaquille Thompson, better known by his stage name Scott Xylo, is a British producer & Songwriter of Jamaican descent based in Leicester, UK.

== Life and career ==
In July 2018 Scott Xylo released the single, "Airya" (which shares a name with a 1972 Fela Kuti record). soon after releasing the single, it was on rotation at BBC, NTS, and other radio stations. He has been garnering praise for his productions by the likes of Gilles Peterson, Kojey Radical and Stones Throw’s MNDSGN. Airya is described by Quietus Critic Aida Amoako "a fractured piece of interstellar genius, somewhere between Mo Kolours, Al Dobson Jr and Sun Ra." Scott Xylo Released the critically acclaimed album "Find Us When U Get There" on 7 September 2018 via Black Acre Records.
