= N. Corah & Sons =

English manufacturer of hosiery and textiles

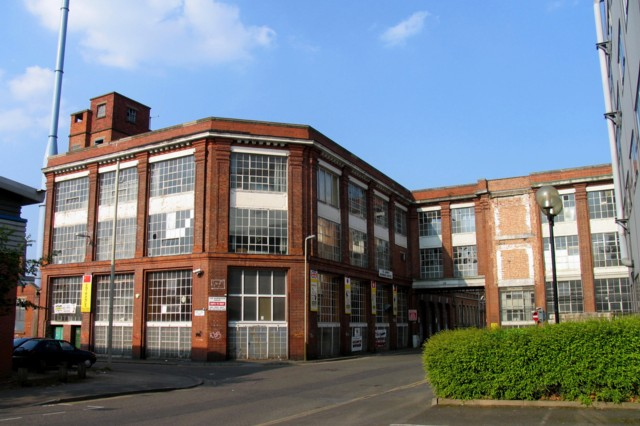
- Former Corah factory in Leicester, photographed in 2011
- Company type: Private
- Industry: Textile
- Founded: 1815 in Leicester
- Founder: Nathaniel Corah
- Defunct: 1990s
- Fate: Acquired by Australian firm Charterhall in 1989, defunct shortly after
- Headquarters: Leicester, United Kingdom
- Key people: John, Thomas, and William Corah
- Products: Clothing
- Brands: St Margaret's
- Number of employees: 6,800 (1969)

N. Corah and Sons was a textile manufacturer of hosiery and clothing located in Leicester, England. At one time it was the largest knitted fabric producer in Europe, and its products had a major influence on the development and prosperity of the Marks & Spencer chain of retail stores.

In 1989 the company was acquired by Australian corporate Charterhall, but it soon crashed in a 26.5m loss, which resulted in the closure of both firms in the 1990s.

== History ==
=== Foundation ===
The company was founded by Nathaniel Corah at the Globe Inn, Silver Street, in Leicester –a building which still survives, and which at that time was closely associated with the city's stockingers. in 1815. Corah's business model was to buy completed stockings in Leicester, and to sell them elsewhere at a profit. The majority of Corah's sales were in Birmingham, and he maintained a stock room in another public house there. The business soon grew, and its own premises on Union Street in Leicester were purchased in 1824. The company remained at these premises until 1845. In 1830, Corah's three sons – John, Thomas and William – were taken into partnership. The name of the firm became Nathaniel Corah & Sons.

=== St Margaret's Works ===
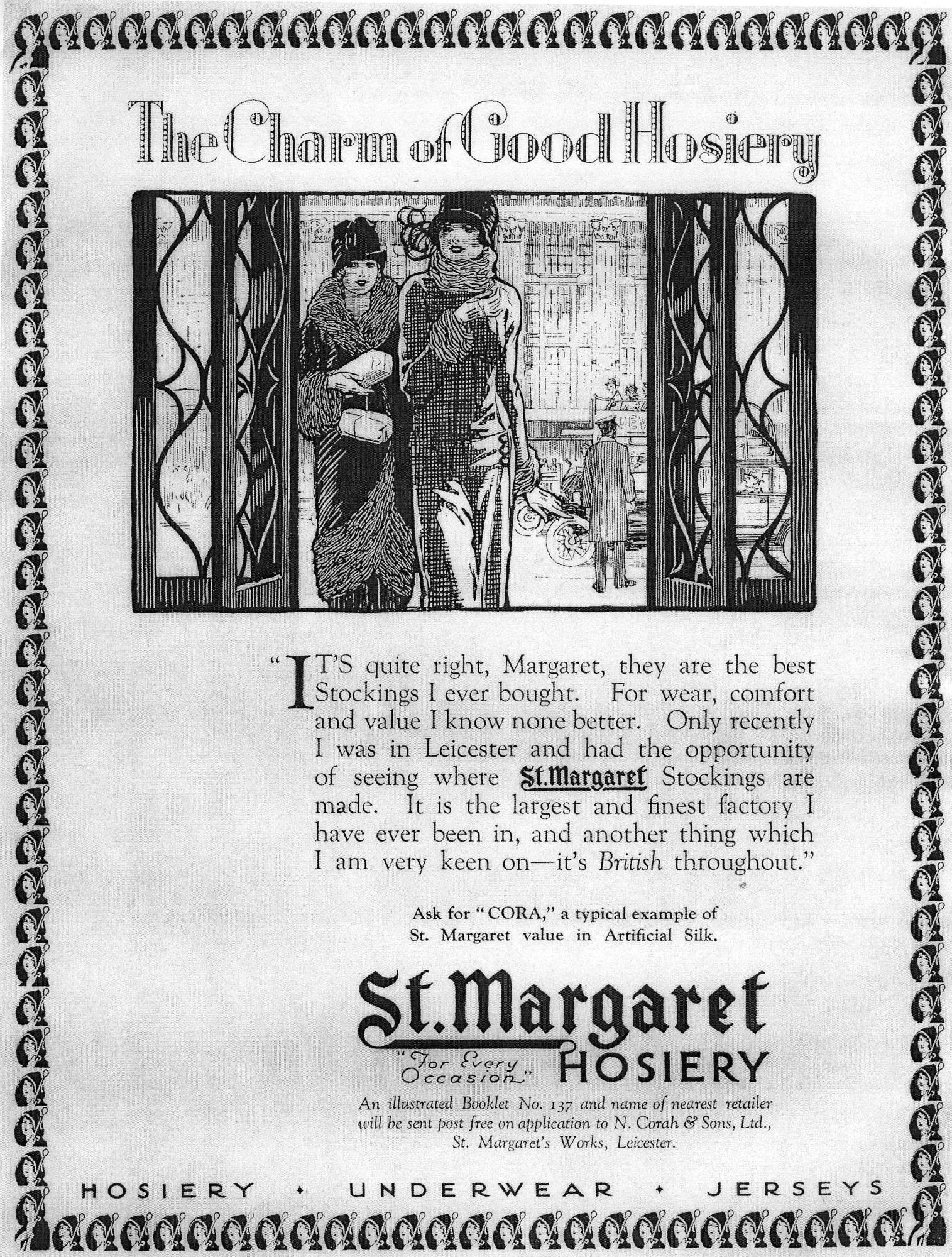
"The charm of good hosiery", N. Corah ad for the St. Margaret hosiery, 1925

In 1855, Thomas Corah & Sons had 2,000 knitting frames, making it one of the largest hosiery firms in the country. By 1865, its premises on Granby Street had become too small, and so the company decided to move. A site was chosen north of the town centre, in the parish of St Margaret and close to the River Soar. Large new premises were built: the main warehouses was 160 feet long and 50 feet wide. At the rear was the factory, an even larger building, the dimensions of which were 294 by 80 feet. The 140-foot chimney was attached to the factory. The works were driven by a large steam powered beam engine, which was started for the first time on 13 July 1865.

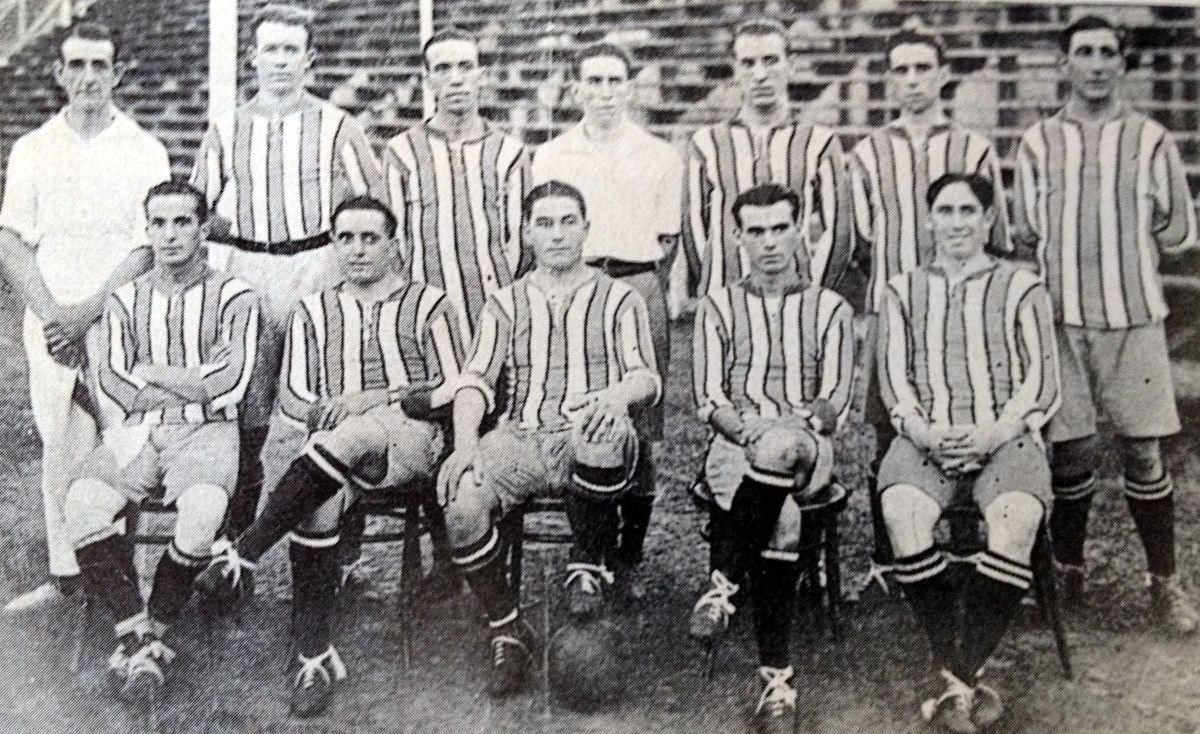
Argentine football team River Plate wearing St. Margaret's shirts in 1920 Other Argentine clubs such as Boca Juniors and Racing also wore St Margaret's

By this time the firm had expanded its product range beyond hosiery. In the 1870s, for instance, it began producing football and rugby jerseys, in addition to a range of men and women's garments.

The St Margaret's Works received many visitors over the years which included international sports teams and members of the Royal Family. King George V and Queen Mary visited in 1919 and Queen Elizabeth II visited in 1958.

=== Relationship with Marks & Spencer ===
The firm was the first company to develop a relationship with Marks & Spencer, a well-known British retailer. The latter's St Michael brand, which it used from 1928 until 2000, was inspired by Corah's use of "St Margaret" as a label for its clothing. The "St Margaret" label was one of the first trademarks to be registered under the 1875 Trademarks Registration Act, and it appeared on products sold in Marks & Spencer outlets until after the Second World War. One advantage of this close relationship was that Marks & Spencer could reduce costs by cutting out the middle man, in this case wholesalers. However, the relationship initially brought with it a considerable danger for Corah: the risk of being blacklisted by the Wholesale Textile Association (WTA). Corah referred to Marks & Spencer in its accounts only in coded terms as an attempt to avoid this, but eventually the WTA became aware of the relationship and removed Corah's name from its list of approved suppliers. Soon other manufacturers began to deal with retailers directly, and so the impact of being blacklisted was limited.

The advantage of dealing directly with Marks & Spencer was that it allowed longer production runs to be organised, which were more profitable, and allowed manufacturer and retailer to work together closely to produce high-quality products. This quality was a hallmark of the "St Michael" brand. Corah maintained a design room until at least until 1973, which enabled it to present customers such as Marks & Spencer with designs for finished products such as dresses. It even sent clothes to Marks & Spencer already arranged by size so that they could go straight into the store. In the 1970s, the company's trade with Marks & Spencer was worth £20 million per annum – and Corah celebrated the "golden anniversary" of the relationship in 1976.

In the twentieth century, Corah expanded beyond Leicester to open branch factories in Barnsley, Scunthorpe, Oakham and Barrie, Ontario.

=== Closure ===
By 1969, Corah's employed 6,800 workers, making it one of the largest factories in the city. But the UK hosiery industry fell into severe difficulties following the recessions of the 1970s and 1980s. Corah's and its competitors were faced with changing tastes and foreign competition. It had to borrow to reinvest at the same time as having to keep prices low - and, in the inflationary 1970s - pay their workers more. At that time every week CORAH manufactured about 100,000 dozen pair of gents half hose, 7000 dozen full fashioned knitwear garments mostly ladies and about 4000 dozen cut and sew garments both gents and ladies. This amounted to approximately 100,000 kg of knitted goods, most of which went to M&S stores in the UK.

Corah lost its last link with the founding family in 1989 and in the same year it was sold to Australian corporate raider Charterhall and was broken up shortly afterwards after Charterhall crashed to a huge loss. By the 1990s the factory had closed.

== Working at Corah ==
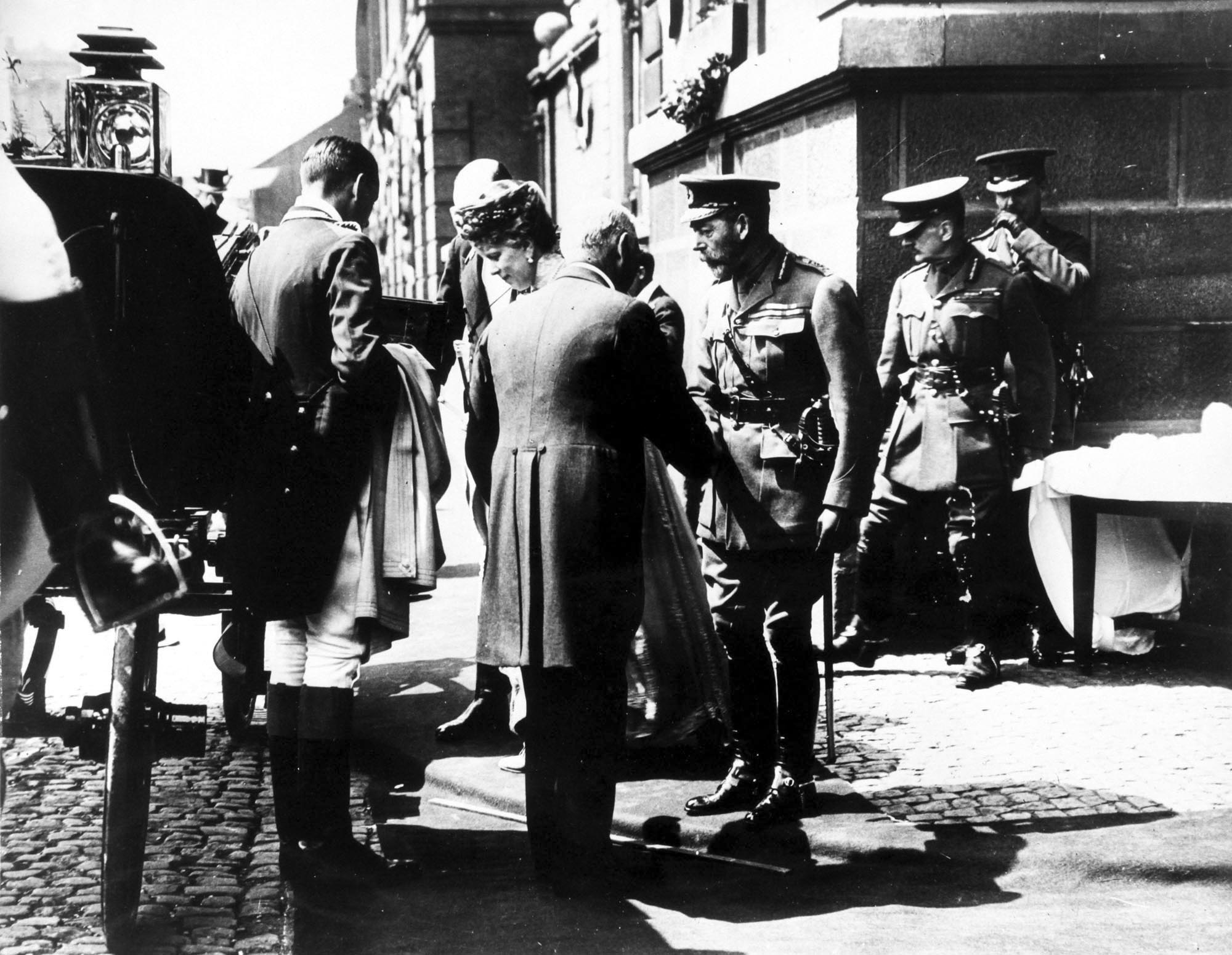
King George V and Queen Mary on a visit to the Corah factory in 1919

The St Margaret's Works were a major employer in the city of Leicester. Corah had over a thousand employees in 1900, many of whom were female. The size of the company was such that 330 male employees participated in the First World War. Forty were killed. At the same time, 70 per cent of Corah's output went to the war effort. The Second World War also had an important effect on Corah – it took away the firm's female workers, which led to a skills shortage once peace had resumed. This led the company to introduce specialist training for the first time in the post-war era.

Workers at Corah had many opportunities to participate in the wider social life of the factory. The Corah works maintained several competitive sports teams, and working at the factory was – according to those who worked there – to be part of a close-knit community in which birthdays and other important occasions were celebrated. The British Legion also maintained its own branch at the Corah works in the post-war period.

== The Corah building after company closure ==
Although much of the rear half of the site has been demolished, particularly the lower scale workshop buildings, the majority of the historic building complex remains. A range of light industrial uses occupy most of the southern-most building group, with parts of the monumental factory still used for small scale hosiery manufacturing. However, much of the site has been derelict since the closure of the original factory and the boiler house chimney has been demolished. The surviving buildings are Local Heritage Assets and sit next to Abbey Park, which is a Grade II* Registered Park. Its iconic nature and it relative openness to casual visitors has meant it has become a favourite of so-called Urban Explorers. In April 2012, the Corah building suffered a fire, with a further conflagration in May 2016, but the most significant buildings were largely unaffected. Exindustria - a lament for Leicester's lost industrial power - was shot partly at Corah's.

The statue of St Margaret which formerly stood above the main entrance was removed to nearby St Margaret's church in 1995.

== Bibliography ==
- Chapman, Stanley (2003). David Jenkins (ed.). The Cambridge History of Western Textiles II. Cambridge: Cambridge University Press. p. 834.
- Clark, Peter (2002). Organisations in Action: Competition Between Contexts. Routledge.
- Evans, R. H. (1970). "The expansion of Leicester in the nineteenth century". The Growth of Leicester. Leicester: Leicester University Press. pp. 63–70.
- Jopp, Keith (1965). Corah of Leicester, 1815–1965. Leicester. – available at My Leicestershire (Manufacturing Pasts collection)
- Room, Adrian (1982). Dictionary of Trade Name Origins. London: Routledge. ISBN 9780710201744.
- Stocker, David (2006). The East Midlands: English Heritage. London: HarperCollins.
- Webb, C. W. (1947). Corah's of Leicester. Leicester. – available at My Leicestershire (Manufacturing Pasts collection)
- Worth, Rachel (2007). Fashion for the People: A History of Clothing at Marks & Spencer. Oxford: Berg.

Further reading Bramwell G Rudd COURTAULDS and the HOSIERY & KNITWEAR INDUSTRY (Carnegie Publishing Ltd) (2014, ISBN softback 978-1-905472-06-2, hardback 978-1-905472-18-5)
